= Astro Wheel =

Astro Wheel, Astro Wheels, or AstroWheel may refer to:

== Amusement rides ==
- Astro Wheel (Chance Rides), a 1967 Ferris wheel
- AstroWheel (Great Escape), a 1969 attraction in Queensbury, New York
- AstroWheel (Six Flags AstroWorld), a 1968 double Ferris wheel in Houston, Texas

== People ==
- Astro Wheels, an alias of American astronaut Douglas Harry "Wheels" Wheelock
