= Expedition 24 =

24th expedition to the International Space Station

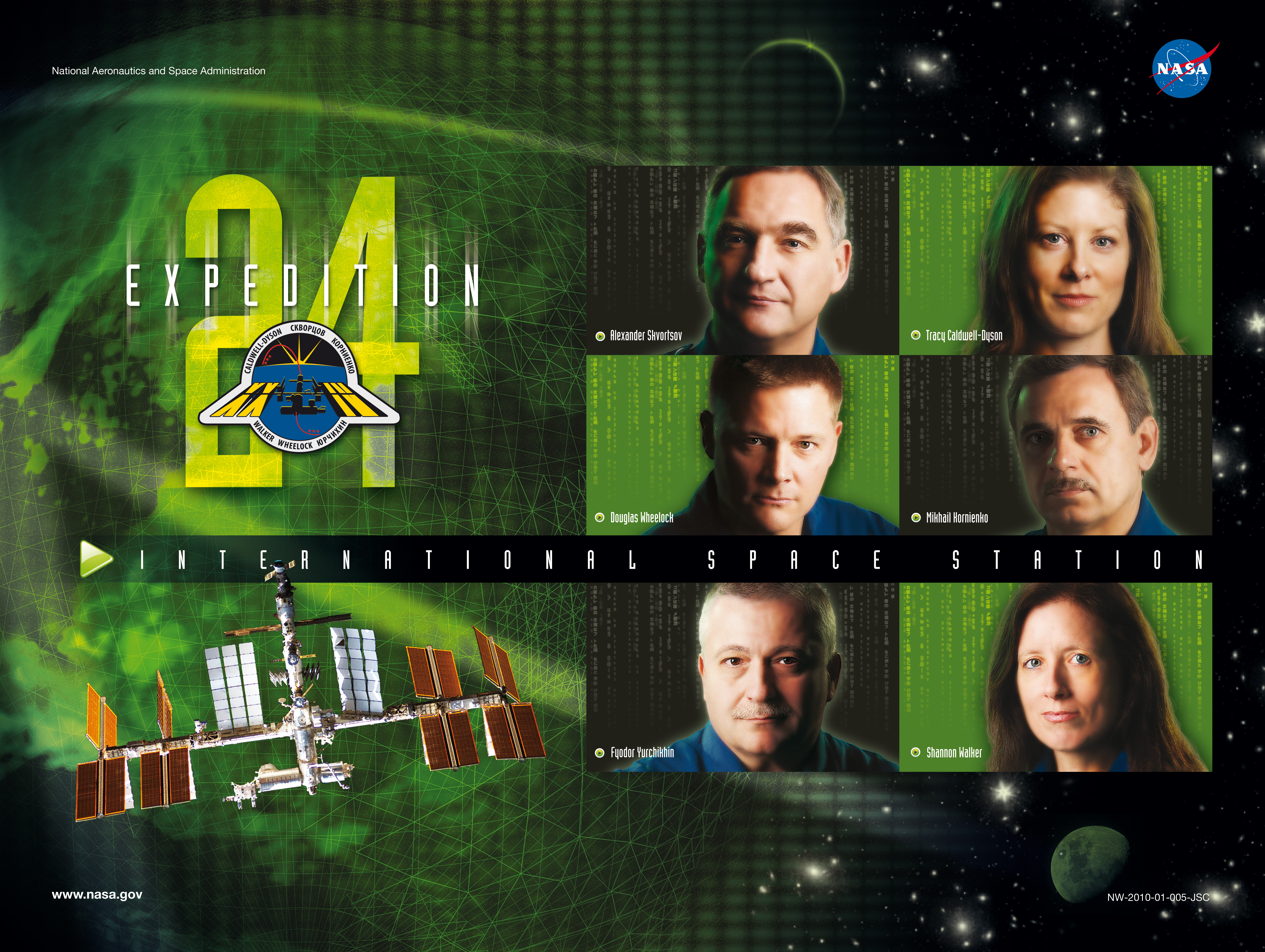
- Promotional Poster
- Mission type: Long-duration expedition

Expedition
- Space station: International Space Station
- Began: 2 June 2010, 00:04 UTC
- Ended: 25 September 2010, 02:02 UTC
- Arrived aboard: Soyuz TMA-18; Soyuz TMA-19
- Departed aboard: Soyuz TMA-18; Soyuz TMA-19

Crew
- Crew size: 6
- Members: Expedition 23/24: Aleksandr Skvortsov; Mikhail Korniyenko; Tracy Caldwell Dyson Expedition 24/25: Fyodor Yurchikhin; Shannon Walker; Douglas H. Wheelock
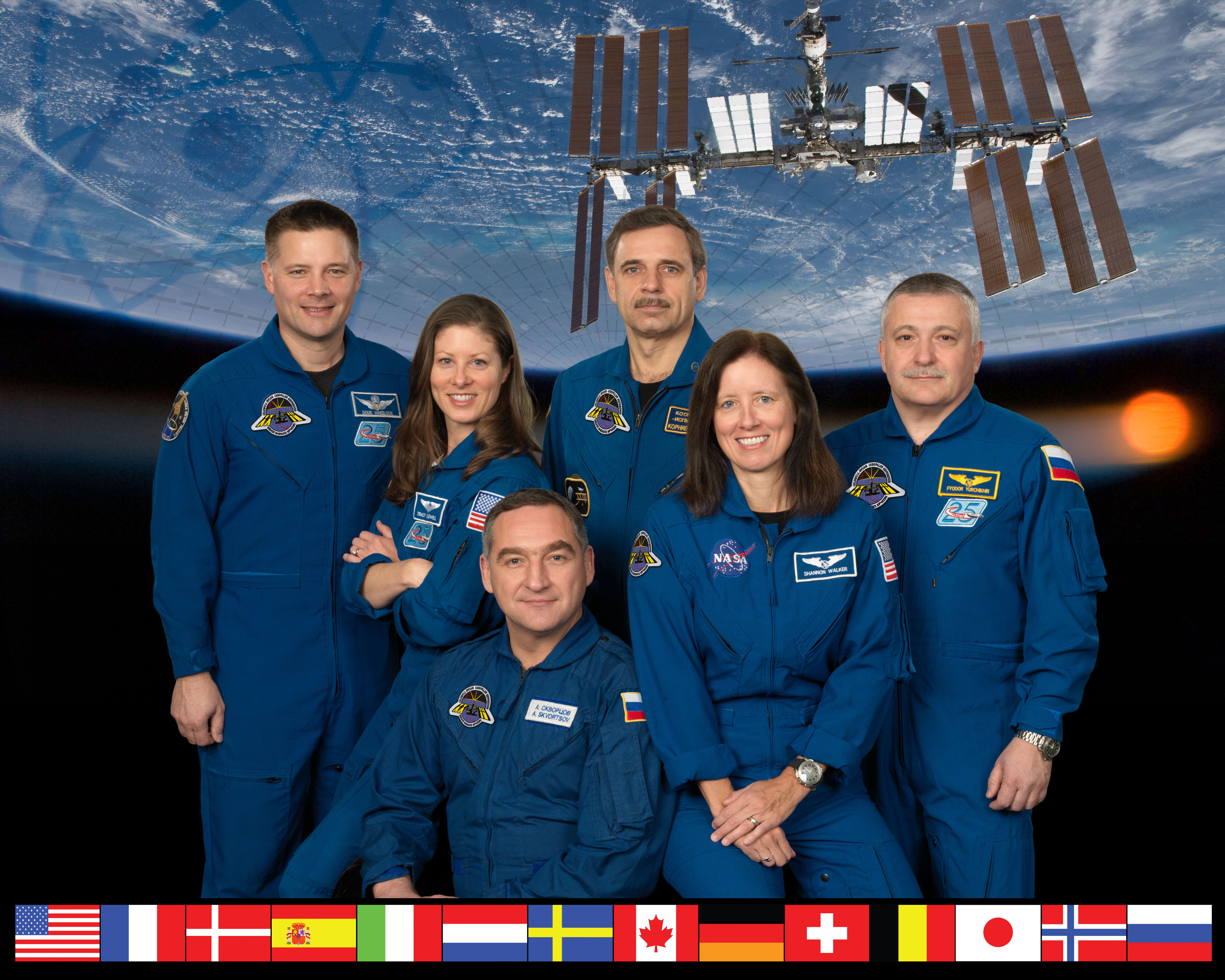
- Expedition 24 mission patch (l-r) Wheelock, Caldwell Dyson, Skvortsov, Korniyenko, Walker and Yurchikhin ISS expeditions

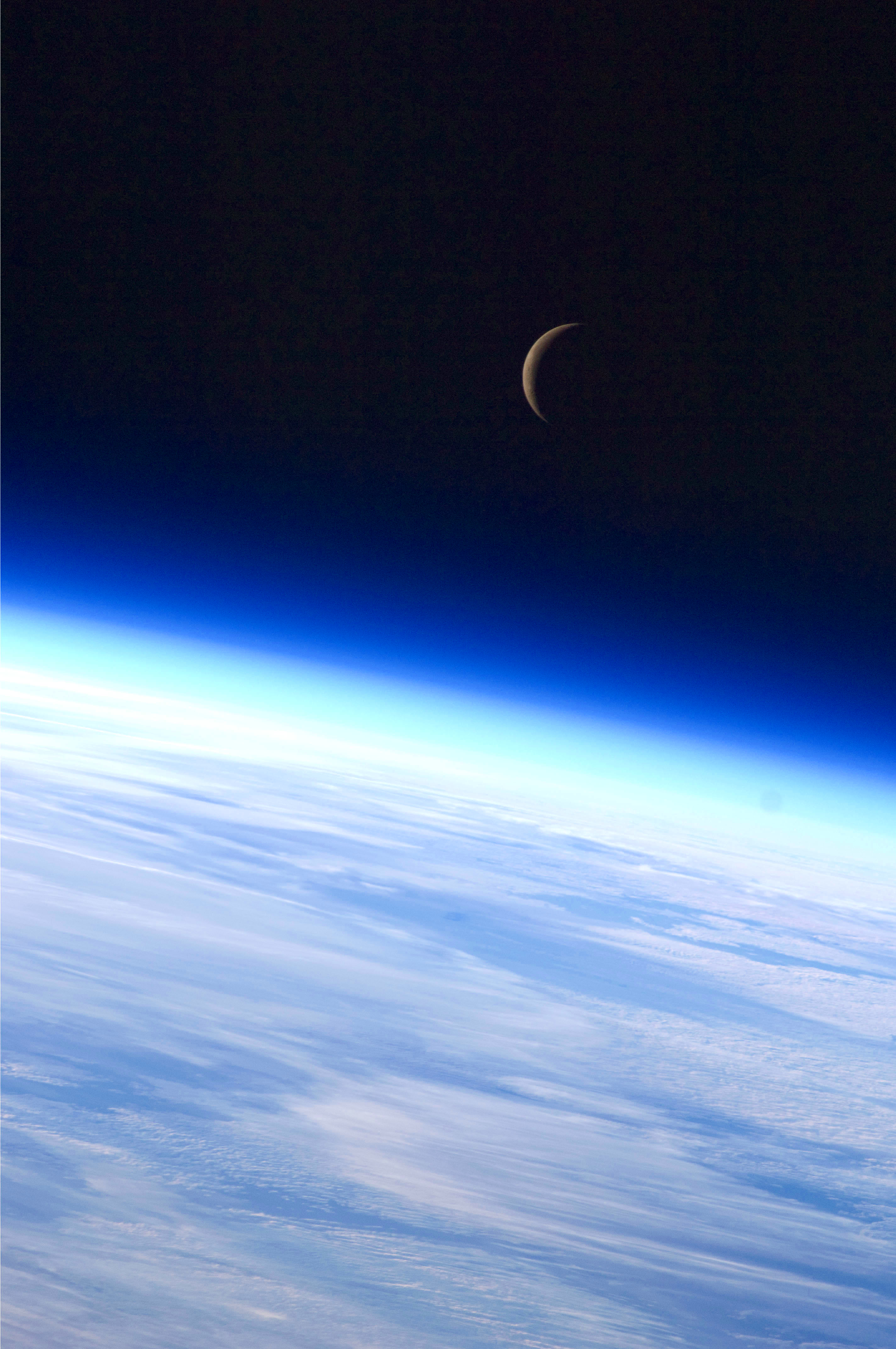
A last-quarter crescent moon above Earth's horizon is featured in this image photographed by an Expedition 24 crew member.

Expedition 24 was the 24th long-duration mission to the International Space Station (ISS). Expedition 24 initially had two planned spacewalks, one Russian and one American Extra-vehicular Activity (EVA). The U.S. EVA was re-planned and a second U.S. EVA was added.

== Crew ==
Position	First part (June 2010)	Second part (June 2010 to September 2010)
Commander	Aleksandr Skvortsov, RSA; First spaceflight	
Flight Engineer 1	Mikhail Korniyenko, RSA; First spaceflight	
Flight Engineer 2	Tracy Caldwell Dyson, NASA; Second spaceflight	
Flight Engineer 3		Fyodor Yurchikhin, RSA; Third spaceflight
Flight Engineer 4		Shannon Walker, NASA; First spaceflight
Flight Engineer 5		Douglas H. Wheelock, NASA; Second spaceflight

Source
NASA

=== Backup crew ===
- Mikhail Tyurin
- Aleksandr Samokutyayev
- Scott J. Kelly
- Andrei Borisenko
- Paolo Nespoli
- Catherine Coleman

== Incidents ==
=== Ammonia pump module ===
On 31 July 2010, the Expedition 24 crew was awoken by an alarm on the station. The alarm was caused by a cooling pump that had failed and caused a Remote Power Controller to trip and cut power to some of the International Space Station (ISS). Astronauts Tracy Caldwell Dyson and Doug Wheelock performed some steps to assist ground controllers in re-powering some of the station components such as two main power buses and one Control Moment Gyroscope. After the steps had been completed Capcomm James Kelly told the crew they could go back to bed as all the work required by the crew on the ISS was complete. A short time later, another alarm sounded and awoke the crew, when the ground attempted to restart the pump module.

=== Docking ring ===
A failure in the docking ring on the Mini-Research Module 2 (MRM2) Poisk, caused a delay in the planned landing of the Soyuz TMA-18 spacecraft. Soyuz TMA-18 was originally planned to undock and land on 24 September 2010, but instead undocked less than 24 hours later on 25 September 2010. The failure is believed to be due to a faulty indication from a micro-switch on the hatch between the Soyuz and MRM2. A drive gear, which is related to the docking mechanism was also found to have two broken teeth, and is believed to be related to the problem as well.

== Spacewalks ==
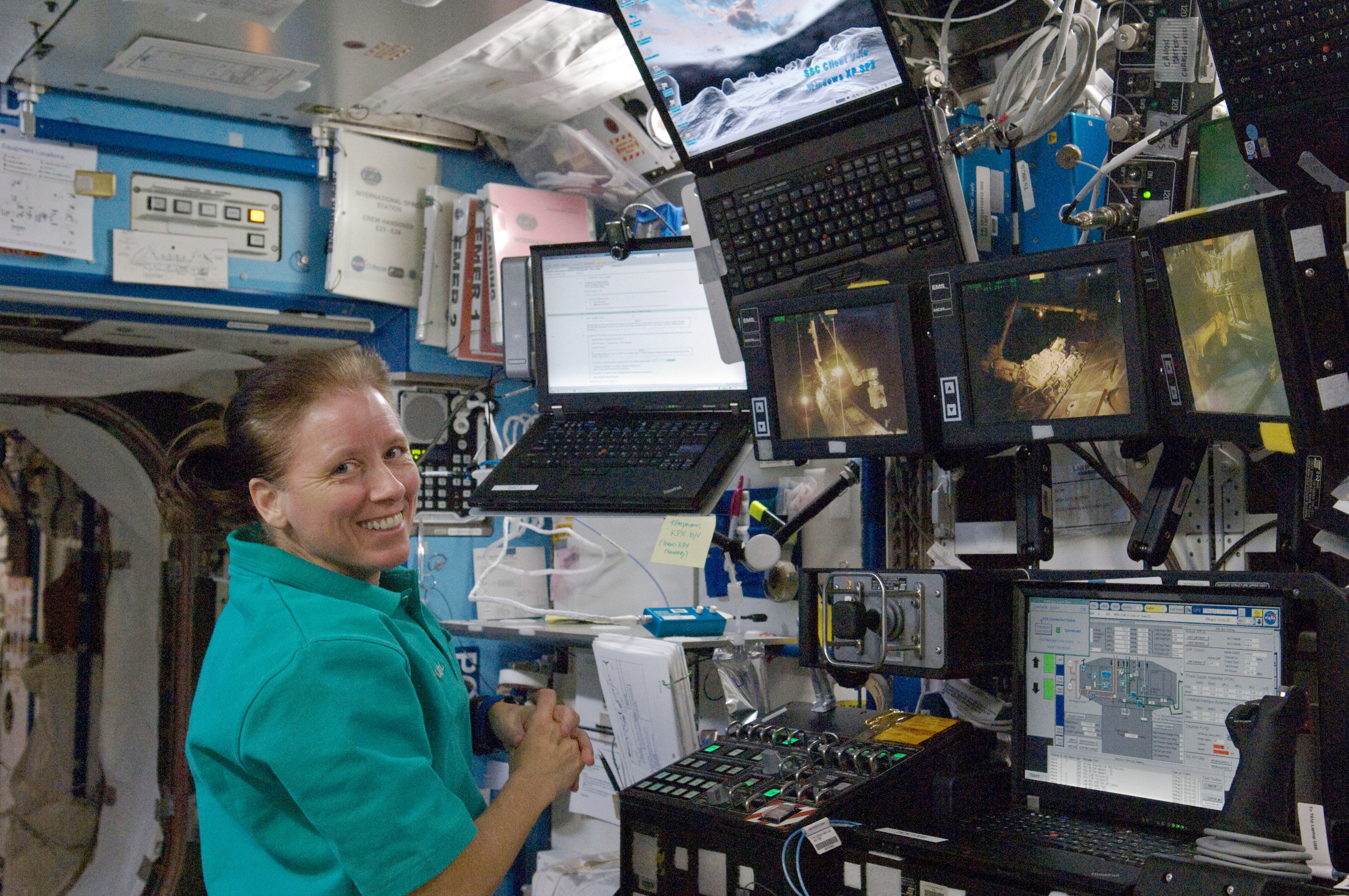
Shannon Walker is pictured near the robotic workstation in the Destiny laboratory during the EVA 2 on 7 August 2010.

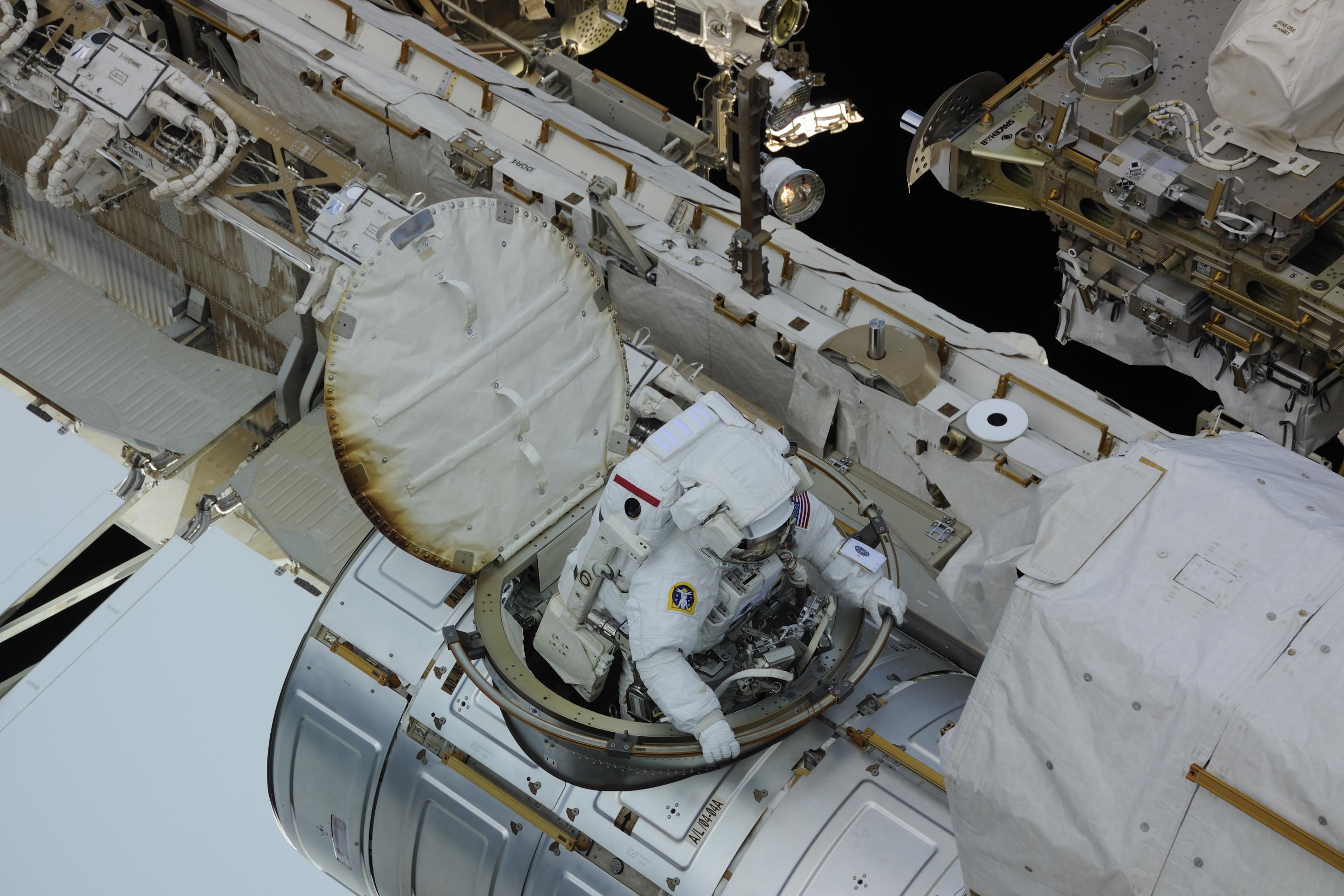
Wheelock egresses the Quest Airlock hatch on the ISS during the EVA 3 on 11 August 2010.

Three spacewalks, one in Orlan space suits and two in U.S. Extravehicular Mobility Units (EMUs) were originally planned for Expedition 24. However, additional spacewalking tasks were added to remove and replace a failed ammonia pump module.

Mission	Spacewalkers	Start (UTC)	End (UTC)	Duration
Expedition 24; EVA 1 ‡	Mikhail Korniyenko; Fyodor Yurchikhin	27 July 2010; 04:11	27 July 2010; 10:53	6 hours 42 minutes
Expedition 24; EVA 1 ‡	Korniyrnko and Yurchikhin ran three data cables between Rassvet and the Zvezda module, routing them along the Zarya module. The pair then installed cables between Rassvet and Zarya. They next moved on to relocate a camera already on Rassvet's exterior, from the zenith or space-facing side to the nadir or Earth-facing side. As their final task, Yurchikhin and Kornienko replaced a camera used for docking European Automated Transfer Vehicles to the station.			
Expedition 24; EVA 2	Douglas Wheelock; Tracy Caldwell Dyson	7 August 2010; 11:19	7 August 2010; 19:22	8 hours 3 minutes
Expedition 24; EVA 2	Wheelock and Caldwell Dyson disconnected electrical and fluid connectors. The spacewalkers did not complete all of the planned tasks due to a quick disconnect that got stuck and would not release. The pair had to complete a "bake-out" in order to ensure there was no ammonia on their suits before re-entering the Space Station.			
Expedition 24; EVA 3	Douglas Wheelock; Tracy Caldwell Dyson	11 August 2010; 12:27	11 August 2010; 19:53	7 hours 26 minutes
Expedition 24; EVA 3	Wheelock successfully closed the quick disconnect valve for the fourth and final fluid connector for the failed pump, and detached the final fluid line from the failed pump. Caldwell Dyson demated five electrical and data cables while Wheelock broke torque and removed four bolts from the old pump. The pump was extracted from the truss through the use of a grapple bar and installed on a payload bracket on the Mobile Base System on the station's truss. Caldwell Dyson then prepared the spare pump for future installation, disconnecting three of five electrical cables and reconfiguring insulation.			
Expedition 24; EVA 4	Douglas Wheelock; Tracy Caldwell Dyson	16 August 2010; 10:20	16 August 2010; 17:40	7 hours 20 minutes
Expedition 24; EVA 4	Wheelock removed the spare pump module from an external stowage platform. The pump module was successfully installed on the S1 Truss after Wheelock attached four bolts and Caldwell Dyson mated five electrical connectors.			

‡ denotes spacewalks performed from the Pirs docking compartment in Russian Orlan suits.

== Gallery ==
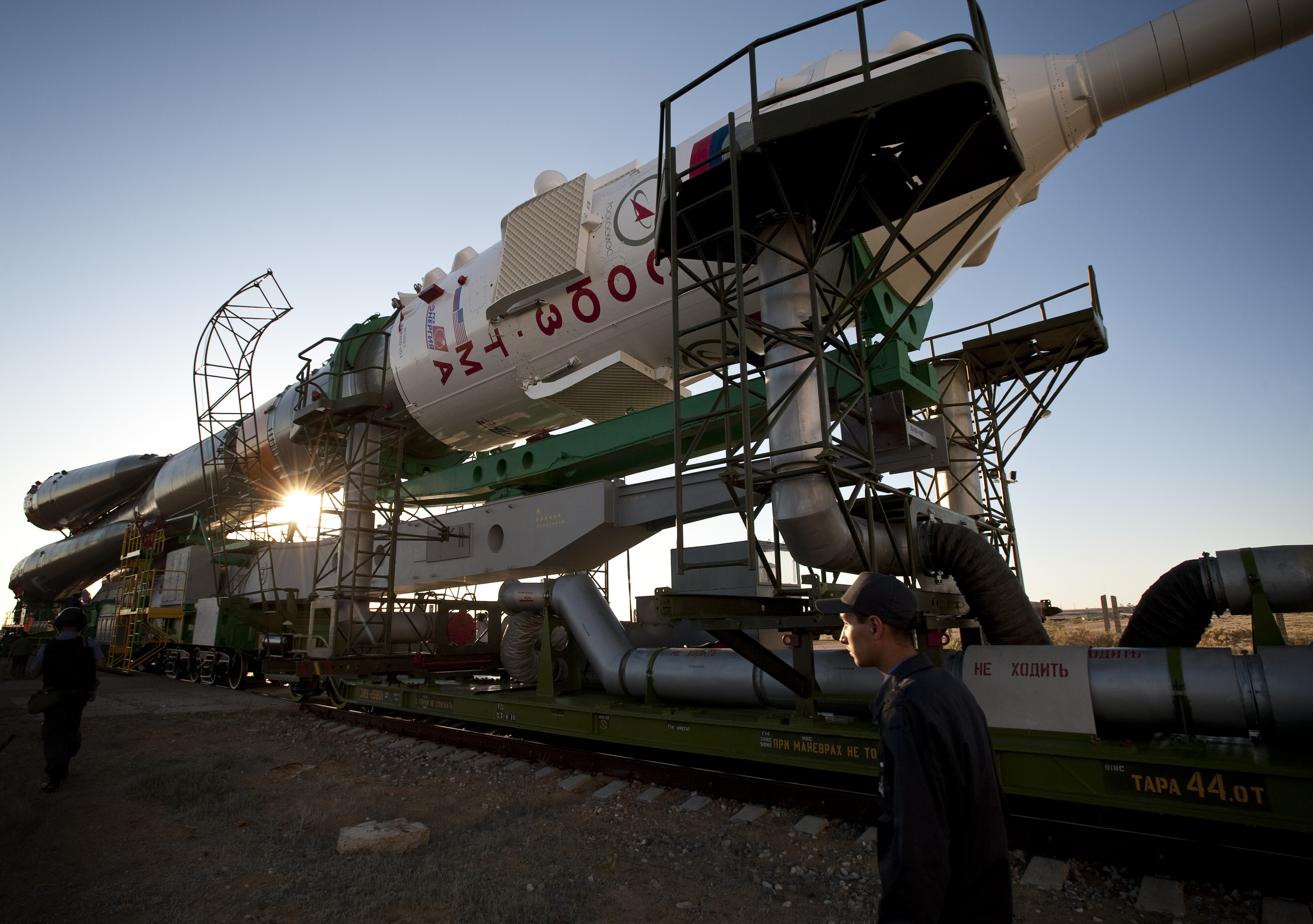
The Soyuz TMA-19 spacecraft is rolled out by train to the launch pad at the Baikonur Cosmodrome, Kazakhstan in preparation for the launch of Expedition 24.

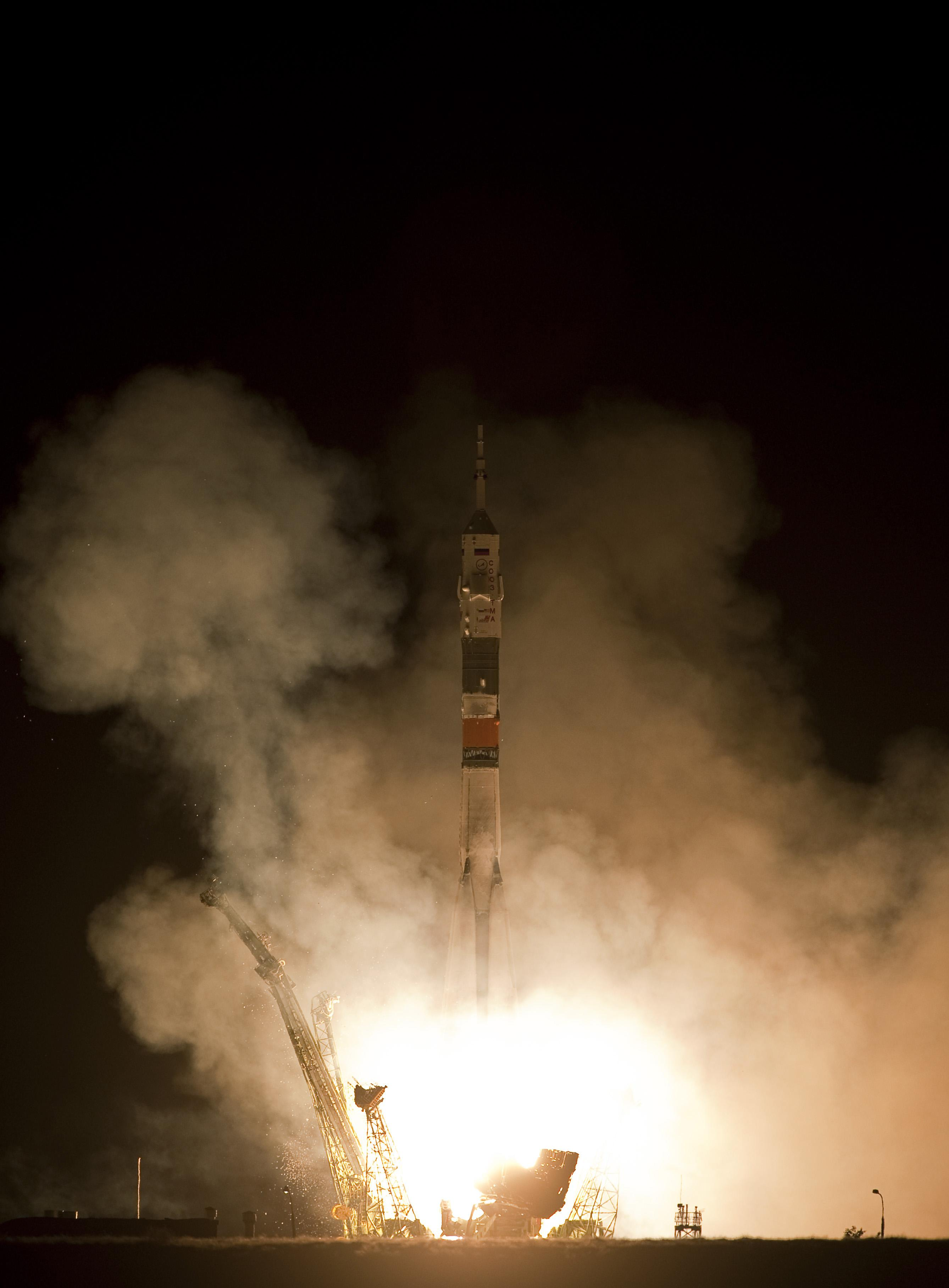
Soyuz TMA-19 launched on Wednesday, 16 June 2010.

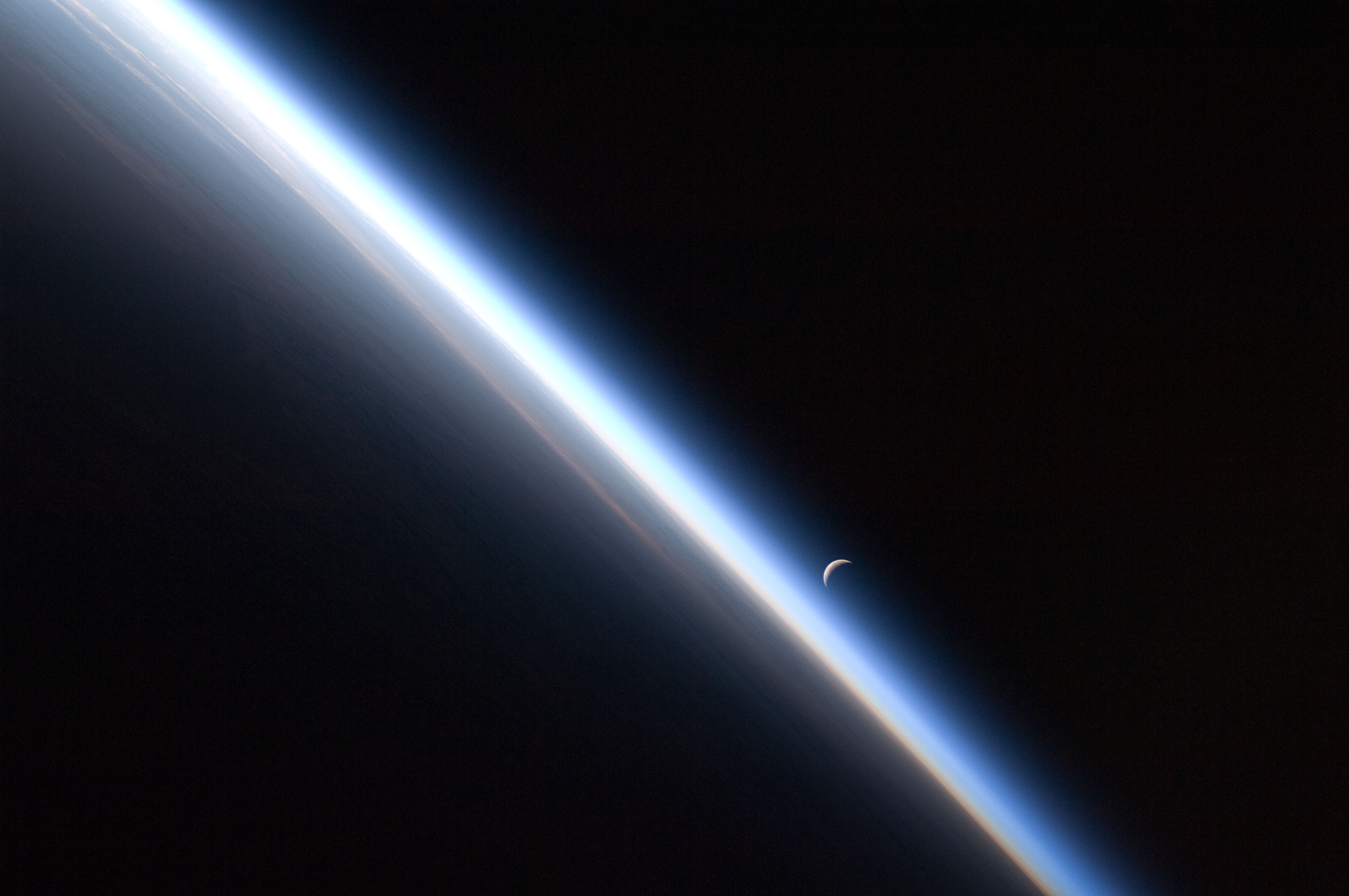
Amazing picture taken over central Asia

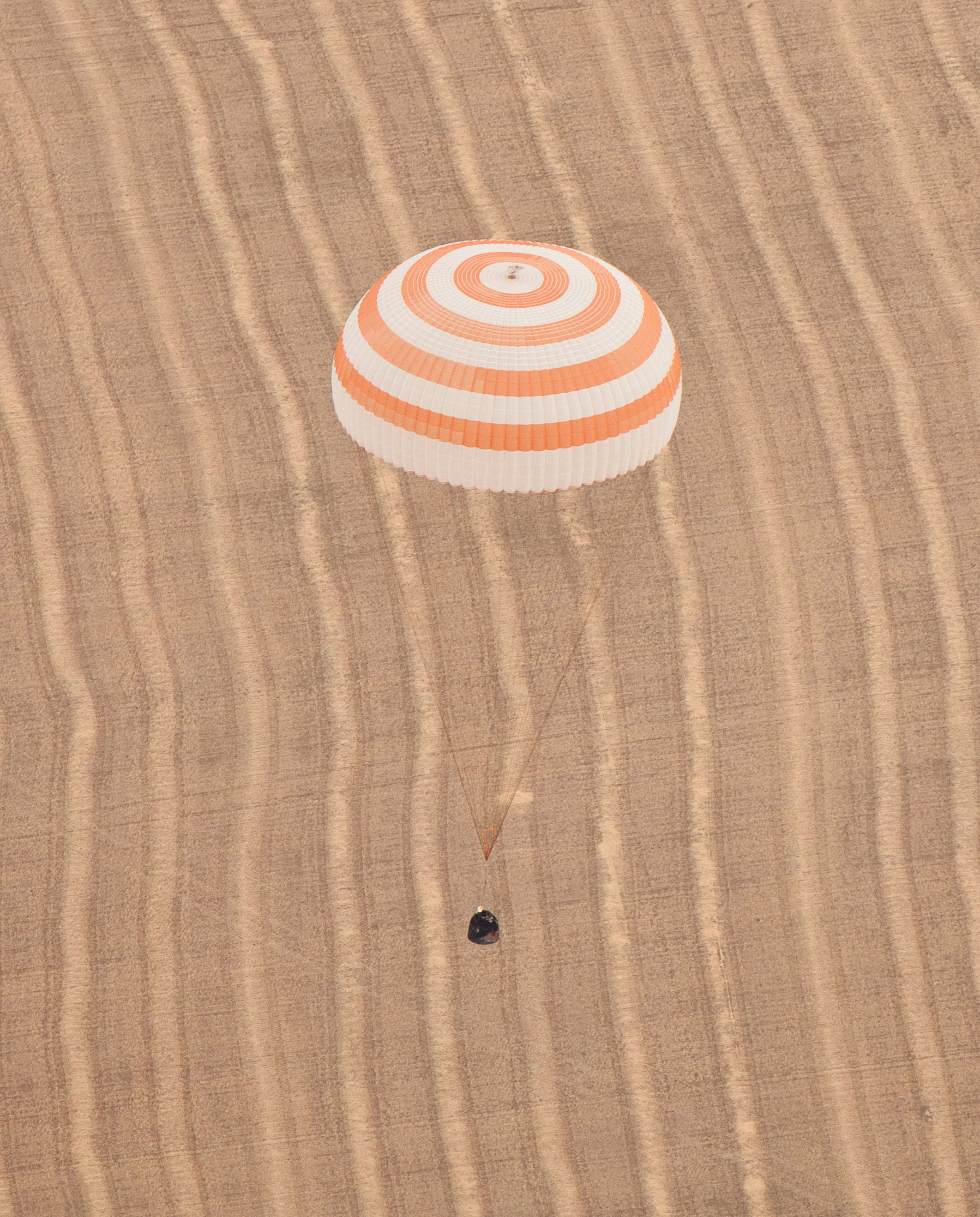
The Soyuz TMA-18 with its main parachute deployed for landing on 25 September 2010.

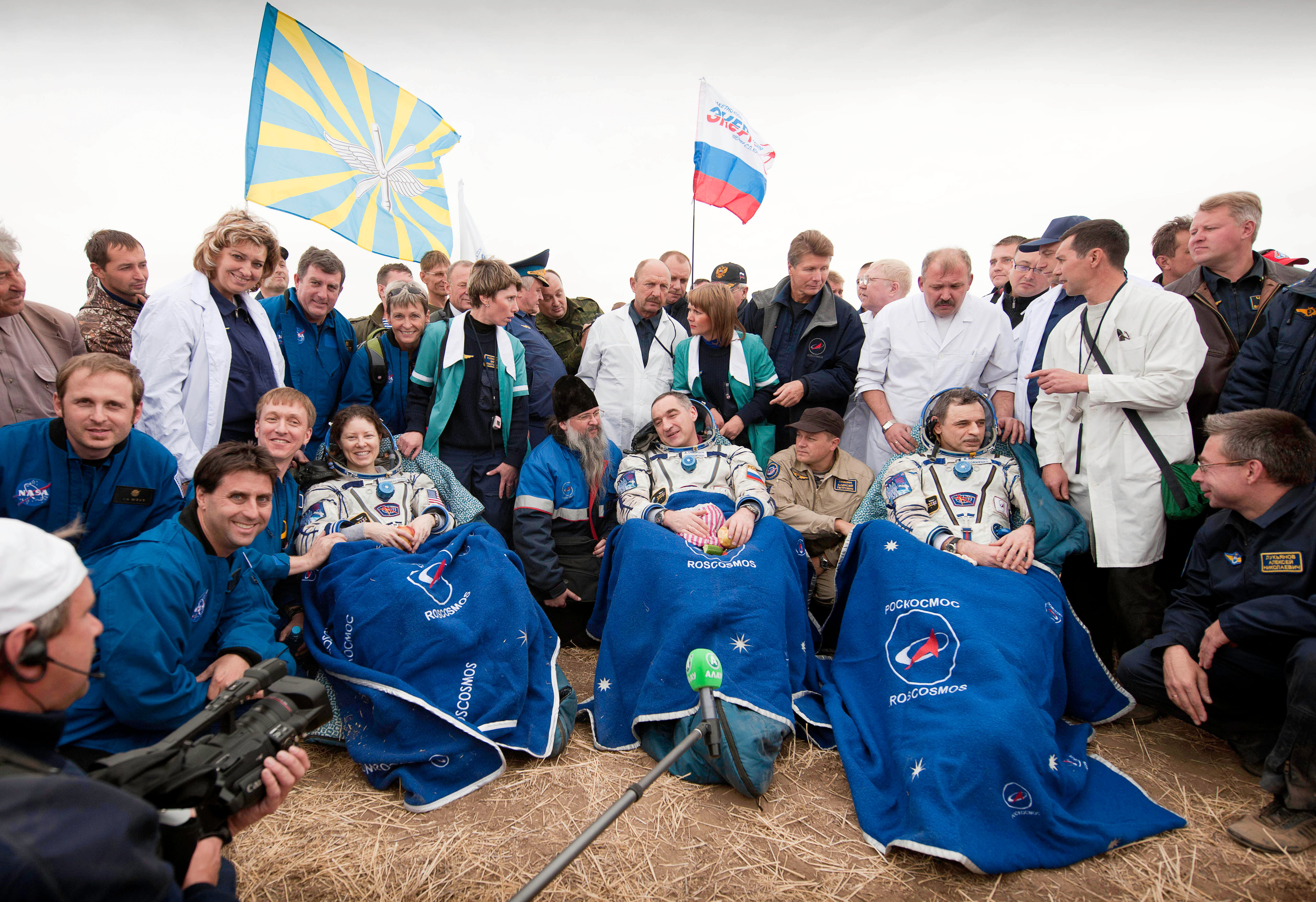
Tracy Caldwell Dyson, Alexander Skvortsov and Mikhail Kornienko sit in chairs outside the Soyuz capsule just minutes after they landed.
