= Soyuz TMA-18 =

2010 Russian crewed spaceflight to the ISS

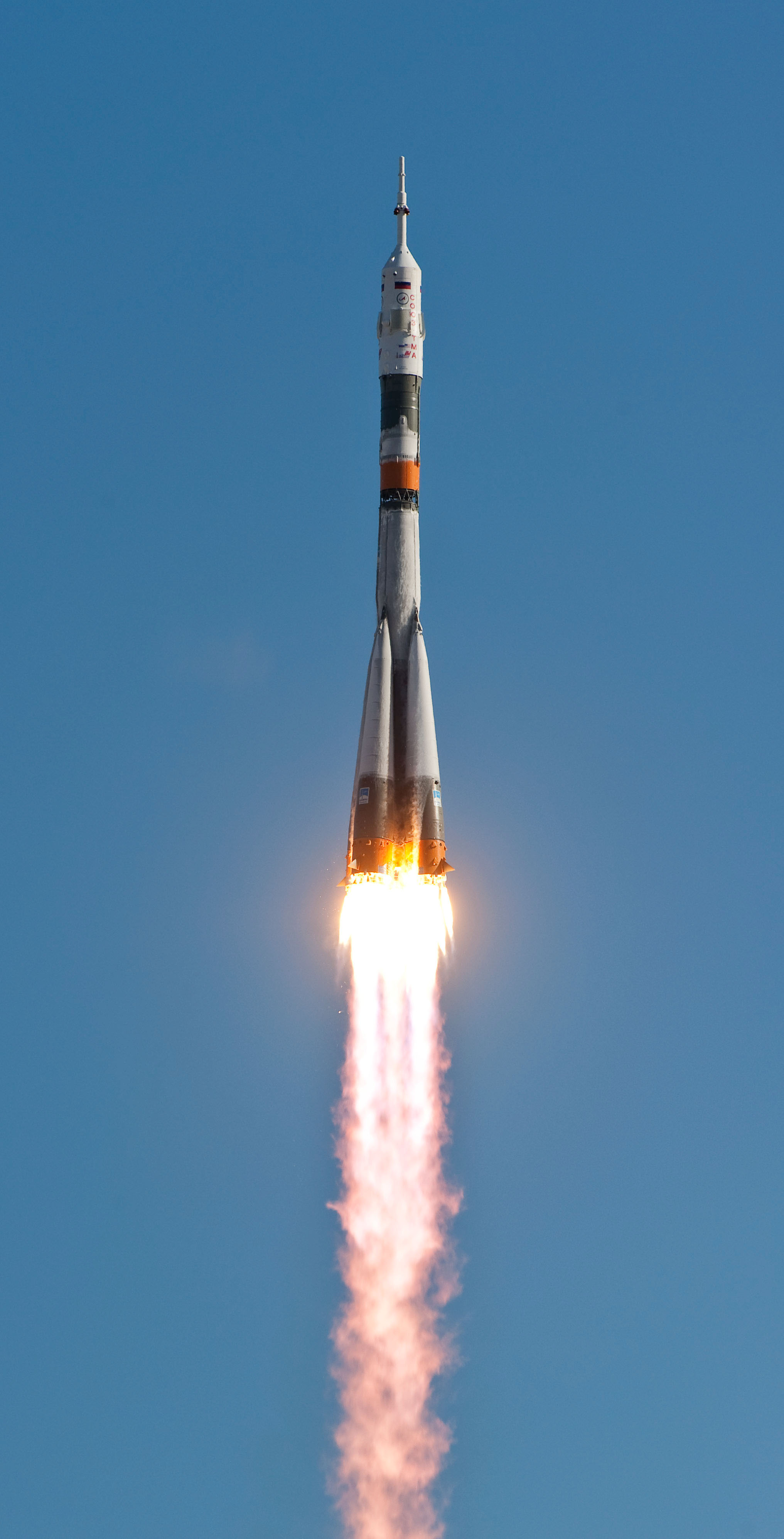
- Soyuz TMA-18 launches from Baikonur Cosmodrome, 2 April 2010.
- Mission type: Crewed mission to ISS
- Operator: Roscosmos
- COSPAR ID: 2010-011A
- SATCAT no.: 36505
- Mission duration: 176 days

Spacecraft properties
- Spacecraft type: Soyuz TMA 11F732
- Manufacturer: Energia

Crew
- Crew size: 3
- Members: Aleksandr Skvortsov; Mikhail Kornienko; Tracy Caldwell Dyson
- Callsign: утес ("cliff")

Start of mission
- Launch date: 2 April 2010, 04:04 UTC
- Rocket: Soyuz-FG
- Launch site: Baikonur, Site 1/5

End of mission
- Landing date: 25 September 2010, 05:23 UTC

Orbital parameters
- Reference system: Geocentric orbit
- Regime: Low Earth orbit
- Inclination: 51.66°

Docking with ISS
- Docking port: Poisk zenith
- Docking date: 4 April 2010, 05:25 UTC
- Undocking date: 25 September 2010; 02:02 UTC
- Time docked: 173 days, 20 hours and 37 minutes
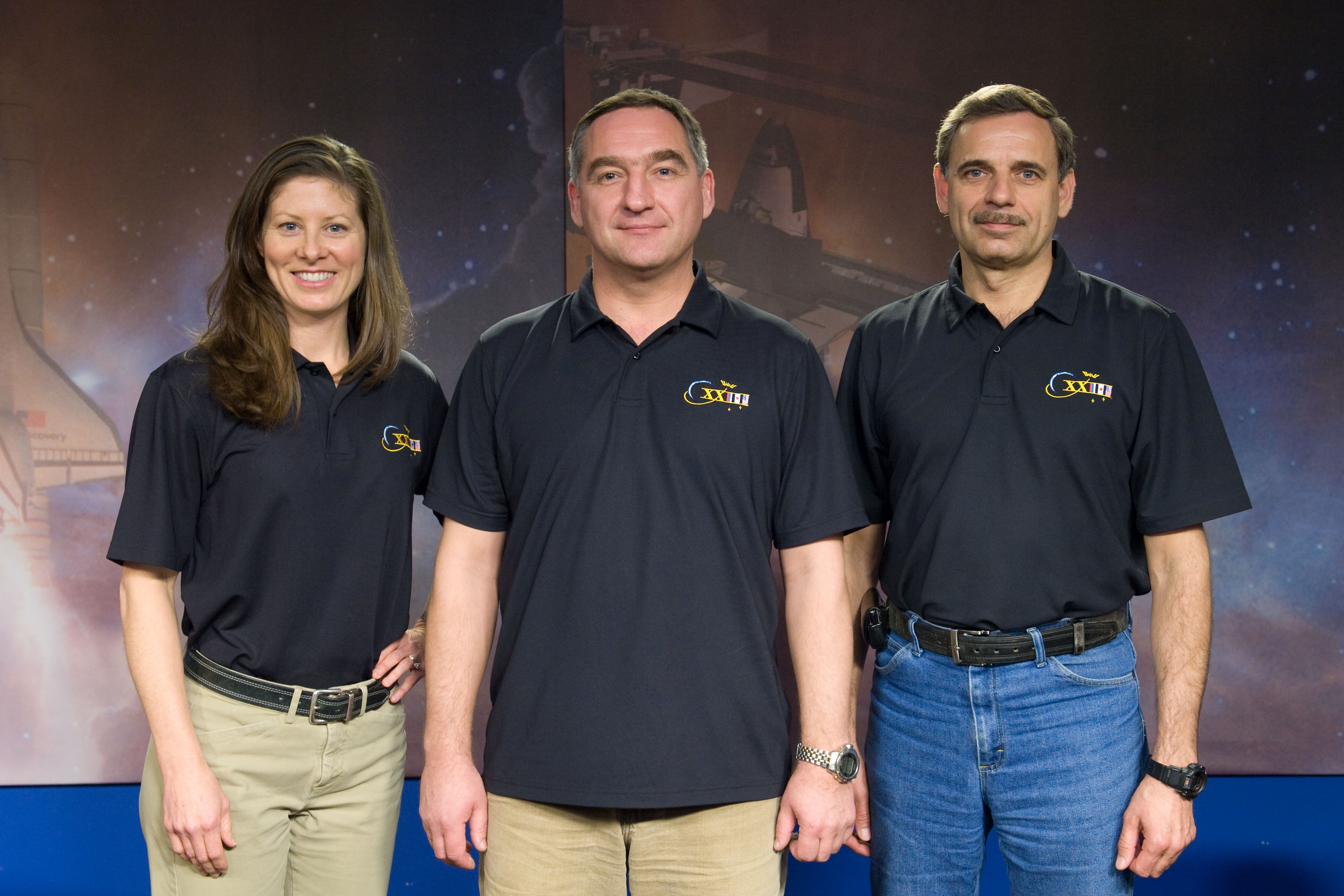
- From left to right: Caldwell Dyson, Skvortsov and Kornienko Soyuz programme (Crewed missions)

Soyuz TMA-18 was a 2010 Soyuz flight to the International Space Station (ISS). TMA-18 was the 105th crewed flight of a Soyuz spacecraft since the first crewed flight in 1967.

== Crew ==
Position	Crew member
Commander	(Russia) Aleksandr Skvortsov, Roscosmos; Expedition 23; First spaceflight
Flight Engineer 1	(Russia) Mikhail Kornienko, Roscosmos; Expedition 23; First spaceflight
Flight Engineer 2	(United States) Tracy Caldwell Dyson, NASA; Expedition 23; Second spaceflight

=== Backup crew ===
Position	Cosmonaut
Commander	(Russia) Aleksandr Samokutyayev, Roscosmos
Flight Engineer 1	(Russia) Andrei Borisenko, Roscosmos
Flight Engineer 2	(United States) Scott Kelly, NASA

== Launch ==
After a successful launch on 2 April 2010, the Soyuz TMA-18 spacecraft transported cosmonauts Alexander Svortsov, Mikhail Kornienko and NASA astronaut Tracy Caldwell Dyson of the Expedition 23/24 crew to the International Space Station (ISS). Spacecraft commander Skvortsov occupied the center seat of the Soyuz TMA-18 with Kornienko on his left and Caldwell Dyson on the right. The launch was perfect and the flight only experienced communications difficulties shortly after launch. The communication problem made it impossible for the Russian mission control officials to communicate with the crew until after they reached the preliminary orbit. However, a live on-board television camera clearly showed the crew was safe. After 9 minutes, the Soyuz spacecraft settled into a preliminary orbit of 230 km × 190 km (140 mi × 120 mi). It also deployed antennas and solar arrays for power generation. The spacecraft spent the following two days orbiting the Earth gradually closing in on the ISS.

=== Soyuz processing ===
Prior to the launch systems testing and integration of the rocket and spacecraft had been underway for several months. In February 2010, specialists at the RSC-Energia and Yuzhny Space Center tested the Kurs docking navigation system and onboard computer of the Soyuz reentry capsule. Autonomous tests of the Soyuz TMA-18 crew vehicle systems were also successfully completed at the Baikonur Cosmodrome and the integrated tests of the rocket commenced at site 254. Filling station (site 31) was prepared for further tanking of the Soyuz propulsion system by propellant components ad pressurized gases. In early March, containment tests on Soyuz TMA-18 were carried out at the vacuum chamber facility. Specialists from the TsSKB-Progress in Samara and Yuzhny Space Center started assembling and testing of the Soyuz-FG launch vehicle. Integration of the second stage and pneumatic tests of the first stage's units were performed on 16 March 2010.

The Soyuz TMA-18 primary and backup crews arrived at the Baikonur Cosmodrome on 21 March 2010. They arrived in two Tupolev Tu-134 air planes. The Soyuz tanking was completed on 23 March 2010 and the spacecraft was returned to site 254, to proceed with further prelaunch operations.

On 31 March 2010, the Soyuz FG rocket carrying the Soyuz TMA-18 spacecraft was rolled out from the integration and test facility and was erected at launch pad 1.

== Docking ==
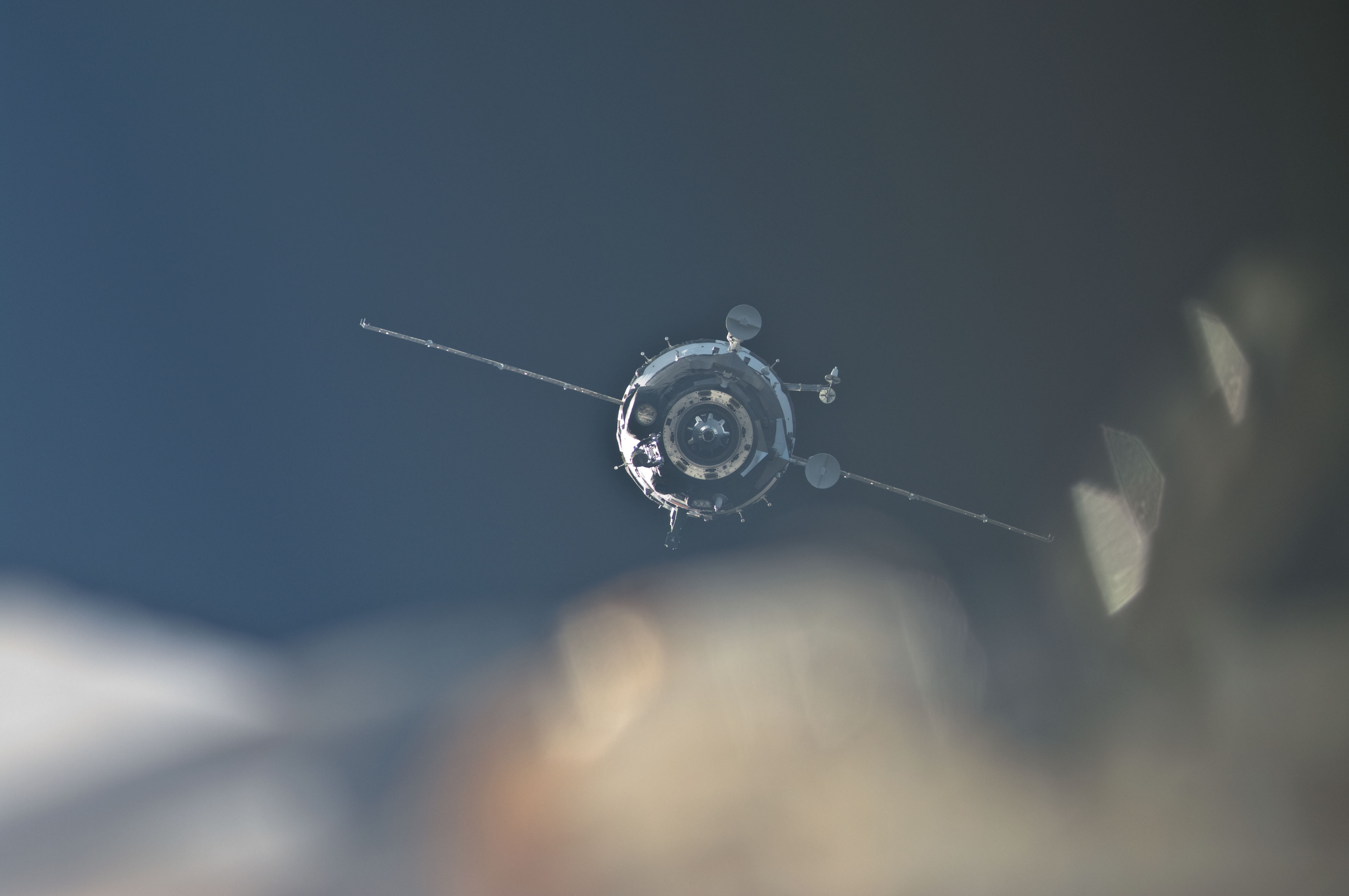
Soyuz TMA-18 approaches the ISS.

On 4 April 2010, three minutes ahead of schedule, Soyuz TMA-18 successfully docked to the Poisk module on the ISS at 05:25 UTC. Shortly after the initial contact automatic closing of Soyuz and Poisk port hooks and latches took place while the space station was in free drift. As part of docking preparations, earlier attitude control authority had been handed over to the Russian Motion Control System at approximately 03:10 UTC. The control was returned to US CMG control at approximately 06:50 UTC. For the docking, the Russian thrusters were disabled during Soyuz volume pressurization and clamp installation and afterwards returned to active attitude control. Before hatch opening, the crew performed leak checks of the Soyuz modules and the Soyuz/MRM2 interface vestibule. They then removed their Sokol suits, and Kornienko set them and their gloves up for drying. Skvortsov deactivated the BOA/Atmosphere Purification Unit in the SA/Descent Module, replaced the Soyuz ECLSS LiOH cartridges, equalized Soyuz/ISS pressures, and put the spacecraft into conservation mode on ISS integrated power.

After about 1 hour 45 minutes spent in Soyuz on pre-transfer activities, hatches were opened at 07:21 UTC and the crew transferred to the ISS. A welcome ceremony for the new arrivals followed hatch opening with family members and dignitaries participating from the Russian mission control center in Korolyov. Skvortsov also installed the quick disconnect clamps of the docking and internal transfer mechanism (SSVP) to firm the joint. The Soyuz spacecraft remained docked to the space station for the remainder of Expedition 24 to serve as an emergency escape vehicle.

== Undocking difficulties ==
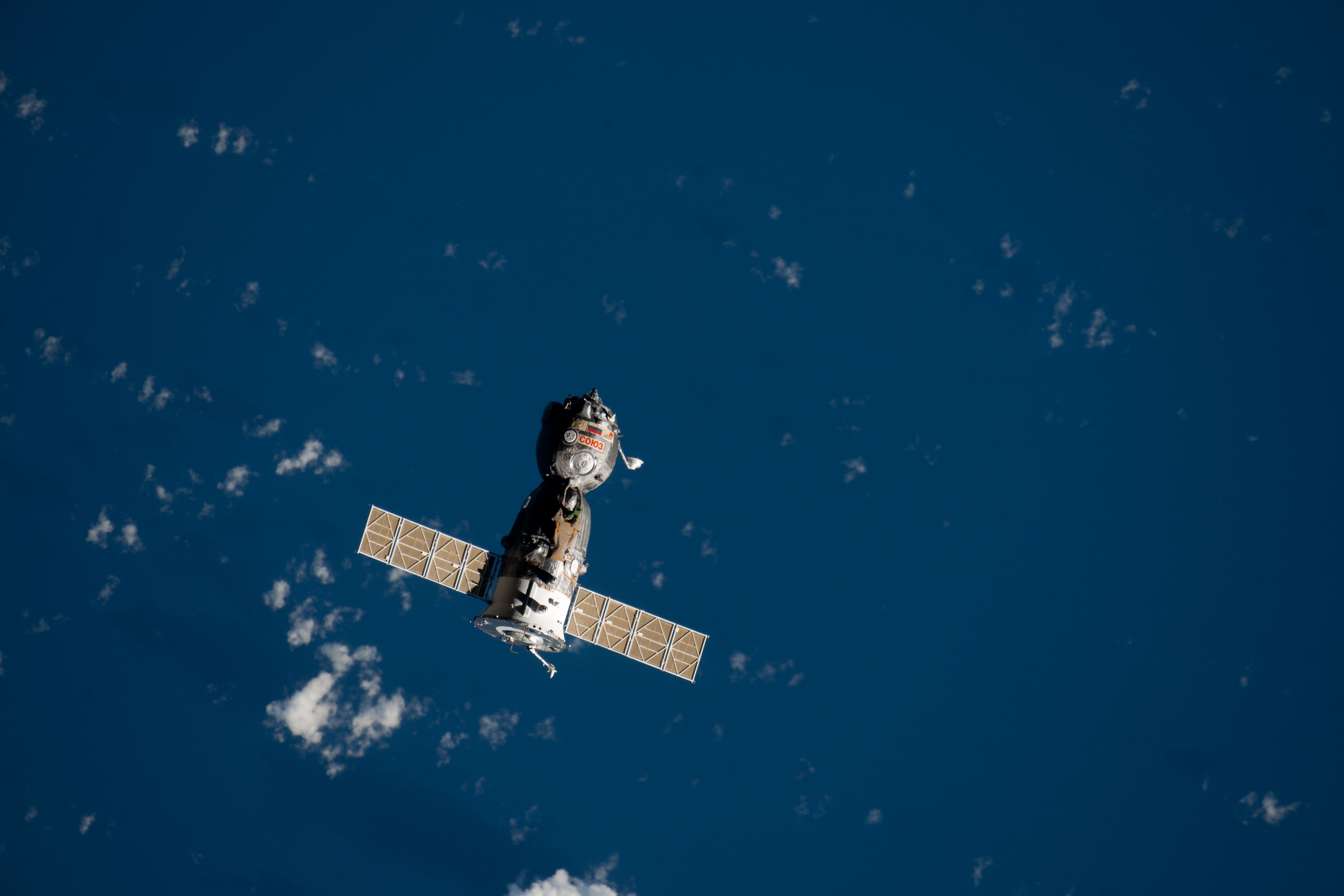
The Soyuz TMA-18 spacecraft departs the ISS.

Landing, originally scheduled for 04:35 UTC on 24 September 2010, was postponed due to difficulties in undocking the Soyuz spacecraft from the ISS.

The crew entered the Soyuz TMA-18 on 23 September 2010 and closed the main hatch at 22:35 UTC. Skvortsov, Kornienko and Caldwell Dyson experienced problems getting a tight seal and were forced to open the Soyuz hatch for a quick inspection. The hatch later was sealed, but Expedition 25 flight engineer Yurchikhin working inside the space station had problems confirming a tight fit with the hatch on the ISS side of the interface. After an extended leak check, flight controllers in Moscow decided the docking interface was tight and leak free. As the countdown neared for undocking, commands were sent to open hooks on the Poisk module side of the interface. But the mechanism did not respond. It was not clear what caused the hooks not to respond, however, Yurchikhin reported finding a small gear floating from the mechanism when he removed a cover. A second landing window was missed at 04:35 UTC. But Russian engineers were unable to resolve the problem with the docking mechanism and the undocking attempt was called off. The Soyuz TMA-18 crew removed their pressure suits, opened the Soyuz hatch and returned to the space station.

== Landing ==
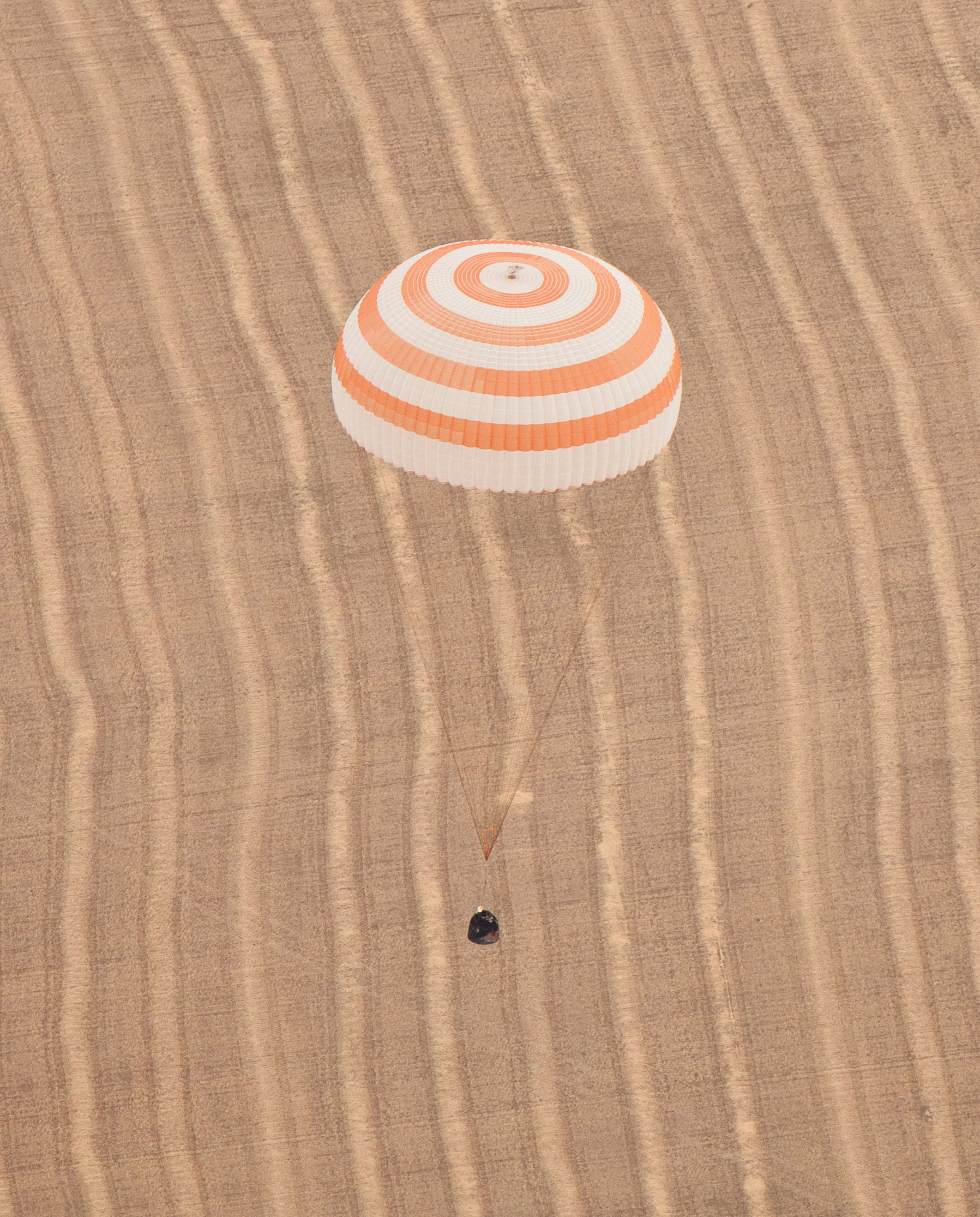
The Soyuz TMA-18 with its main parachute deployed for landing.

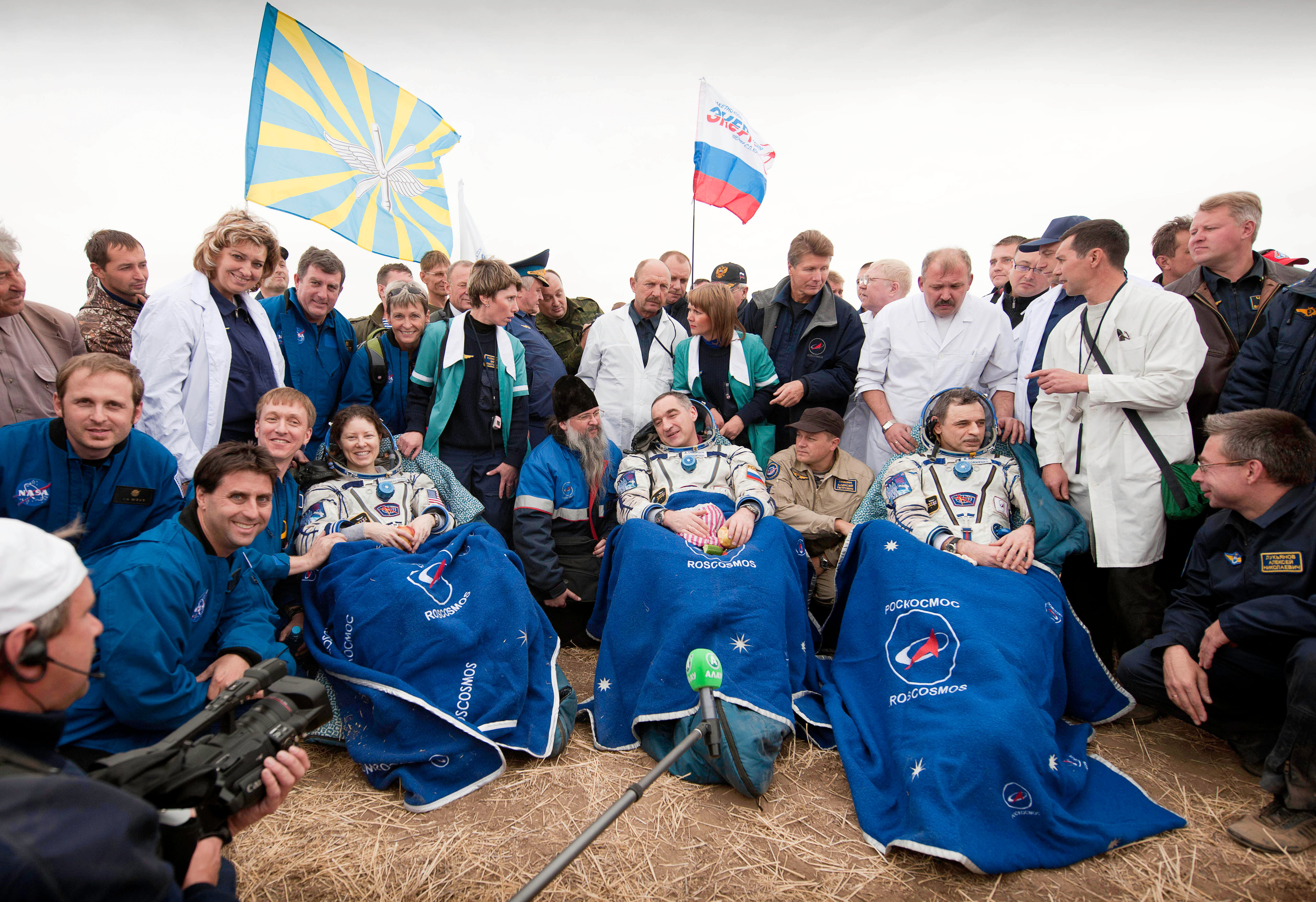
The crew sits in chairs outside the Soyuz capsule minutes after the landing.

Marking the end of Expedition 24, Skvortsov, Kornienko and Caldwell Dyson successfully undocked their Soyuz TMA-18 at 02:32 UTC on 25 September 2010 from the Poisk docking port on the Zvezda module. After undocking and a normal descent, the Soyuz-TMA 18 spacecraft landed at 05:23 UTC near Arkalyk, Kazakhstan. At that time, the International Space Station was orbiting at 350 km (220 mi) above over the Pacific Ocean off the coast of Japan.

Russian recovery teams and helicopters were on hand to help the crew exit the spacecraft and adjust to gravity after 176 days in space.

== Mission insignia ==
The Soyuz TMA-18 mission patch was designed by Nastya Berezutskaya of Kurchatov, Kursk region.
