= Aleksandr Skvortsov (cosmonaut) =

Russian cosmonaut (born 1966)

- Александр Скворцов
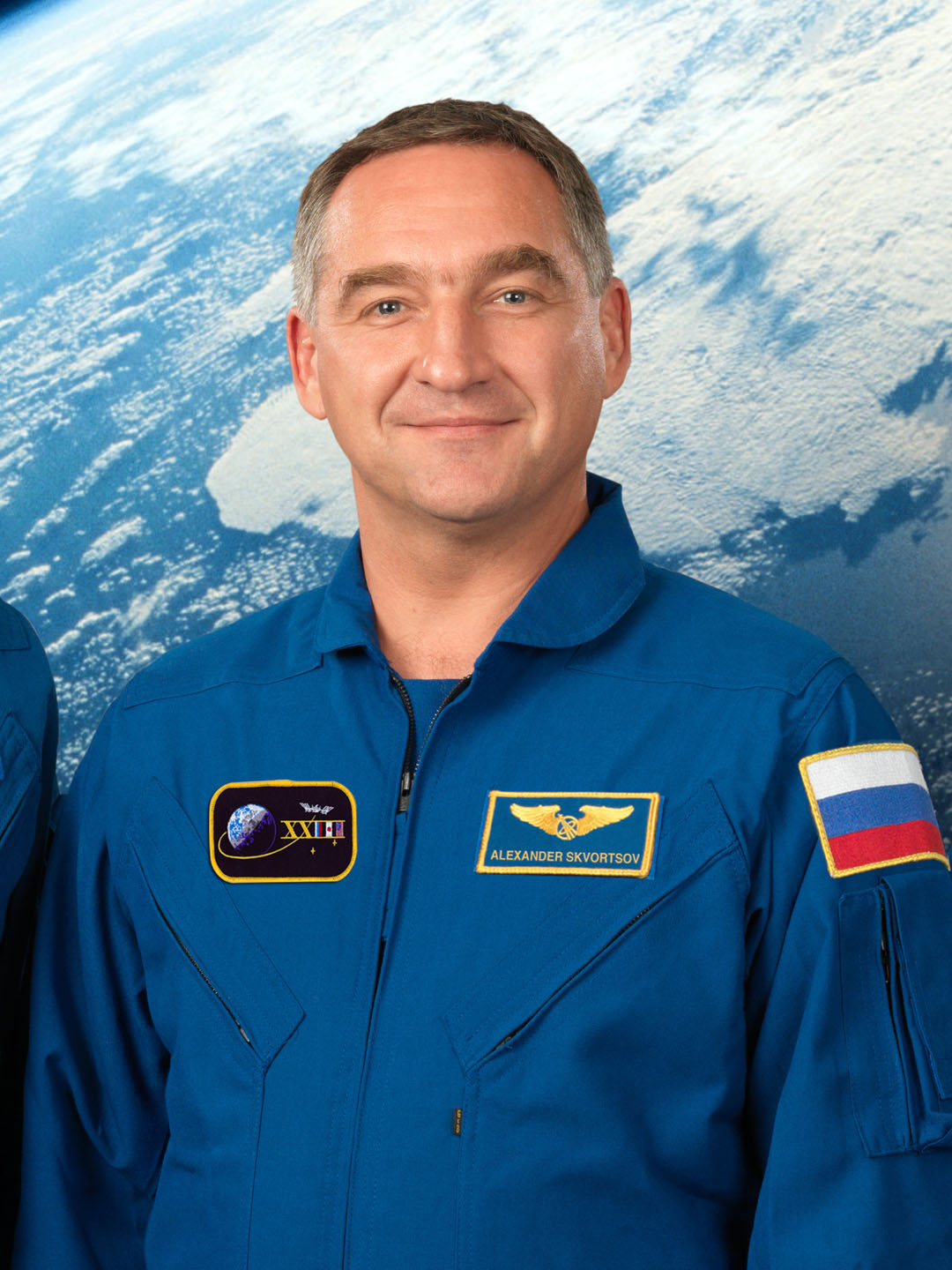
- Born: May 6, 1966 (age 60); Schelkovo, Moscow Oblast, Russian SFSR, Soviet Union
- Space career

Roscosmos cosmonaut
- Status: Retired
- Rank: Colonel, Russian Air Force
- Time in space: 545 days, 23 hours, 8 minutes
- Selection: 1997 TsPK Cosmonaut Group
- Total EVAs: 2
- Total EVA time: 12 hours, 34 minutes
- Missions: Soyuz TMA-18 (Expedition 23/24), Soyuz TMA-12M (Expedition 39/40), Soyuz MS-13 (Expedition 60/61)
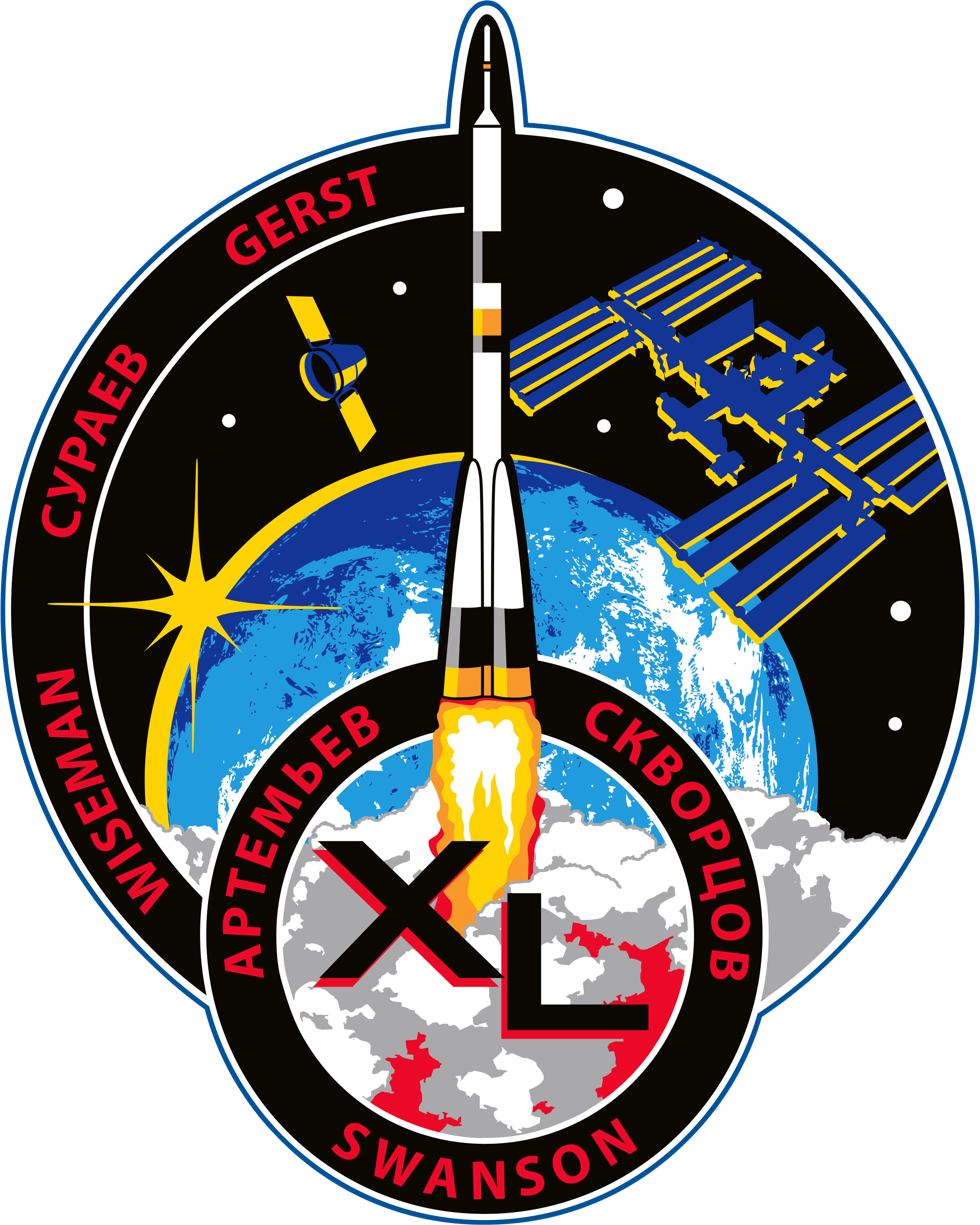
- Mission insignia
- Retired: April 29, 2022

Aleksandr Aleksandrovich Skvortsov (Russian: Aлександр Aлександрович Скворцов; born May 6, 1966) is a former Russian cosmonaut. He is a veteran of three spaceflights, which were long-duration missions aboard the International Space Station. His first spaceflight took place from April to September 2010, and was launched with the spacecraft Soyuz TMA-18. He arrived at the station part way through Expedition 23, of which Oleg Kotov was the commander. When Expedition 24 began in June, Skvortsov became commander.

== Personal life ==
Skvortsov is married to Elena Georgievna Skvortsova (née Krasnikova). They have one daughter, Anna Aleksandrovna Skvortsova, born in 1990. His father is Aleksandr Aleksandrovich Skvortsov, born in 1942 and his mother is Nina Ivanovna Skvortsova (Zabelina), born in 1938. Skvortsov's hobbies include diving, soccer, badminton, fishing, hunting, and tourism. He is also a qualified underwater diving and powered paragliding (paraborne) instructor.

== Education ==
Skvortsov graduated from the Stavropol Air Force Pilot and Navigator School (located at Stavropol Shpakovskoye Airport) as pilot-engineer in 1987, and in 1997 from the Military Red Banner Air Defense Academy. Currently he is working towards a law degree at the Russian Academy of Civil Service.

== Awards ==
Skvortsov was awarded:

- Hero of the Russian Federation
- Pilot-Cosmonaut of the Russian Federation
- Jubilee Medal "70 Years of the Armed Forces of the USSR"
- Russian Armed Forces Meritorious Service Medal of the 1st, 2nd, and 3rd degree,
- Commendation Medal of 3rd degree,
- Military Superior Service medal of 2nd degree.

== Experience ==
Skvortsov flew L-39, MiG-23 and Su-27 aircraft as a pilot, senior pilot and chief of aircraft formation. Skvortsov has logged around 1000 hours of flight time. He is a Class 1 Air Force pilot, a qualified diver and paraborne instructor.

== Cosmonaut career ==
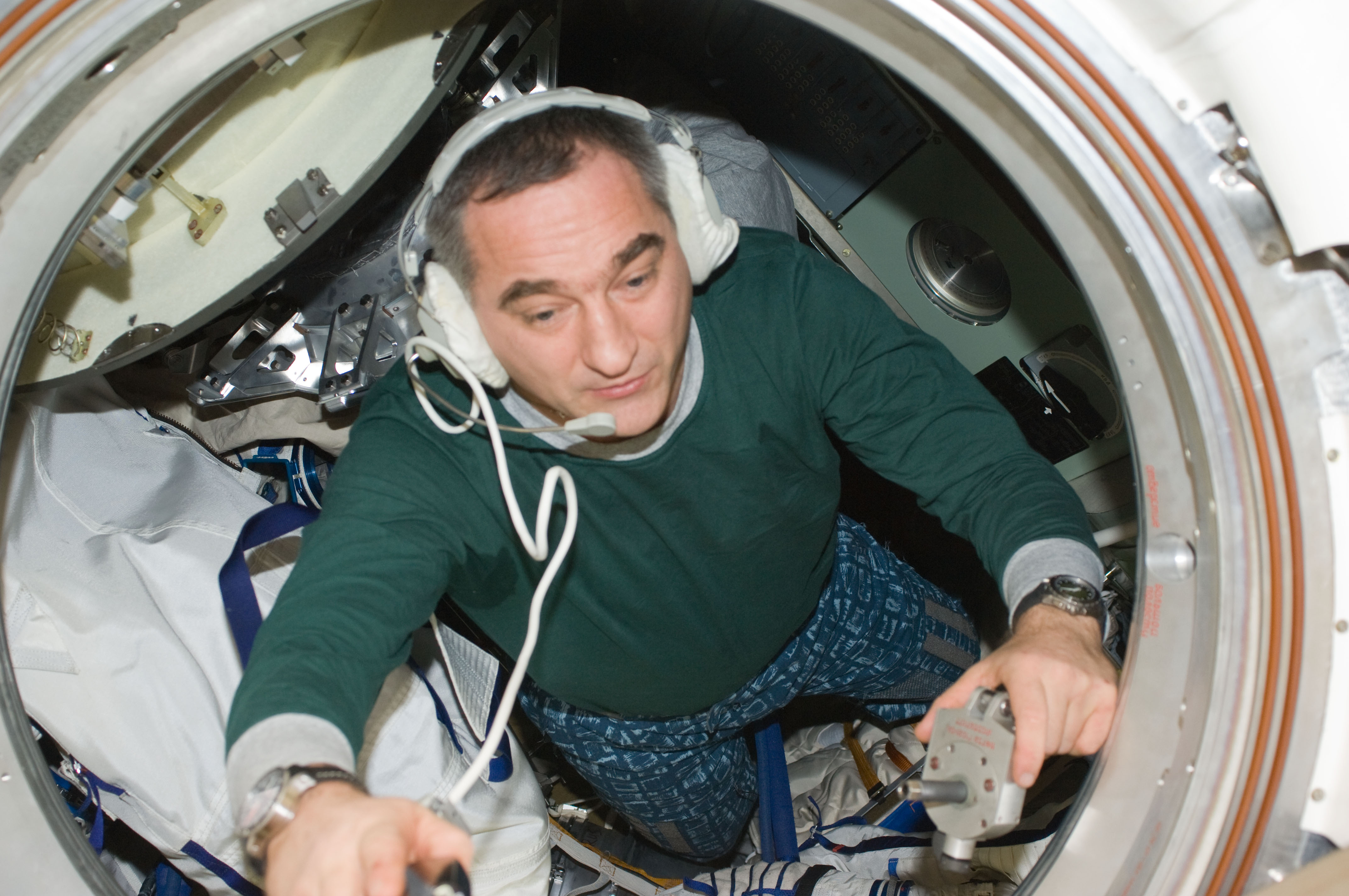
Skvortsov inside the Soyuz TMA-18 making final preparations to undock from the ISS.

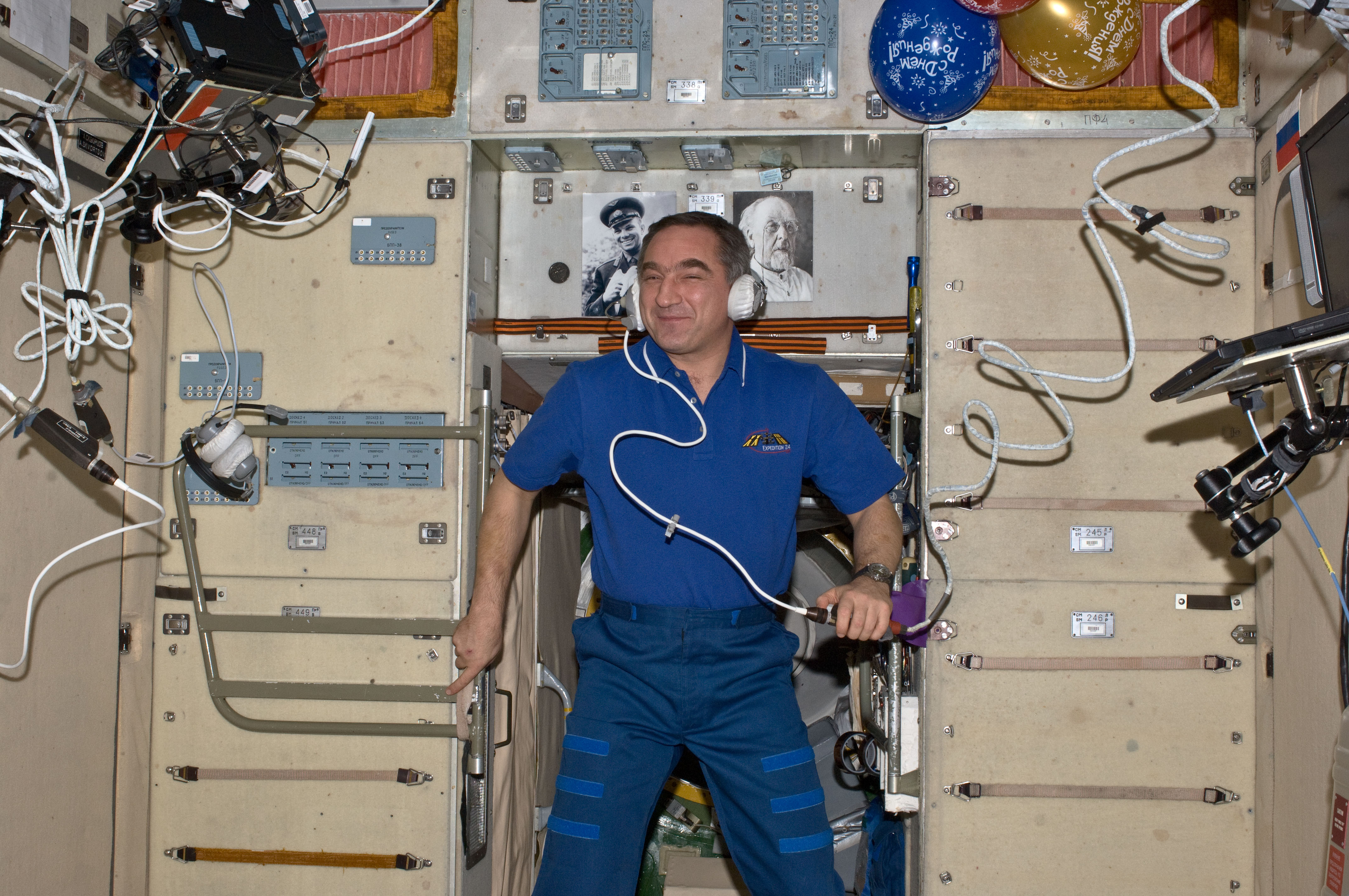
Skvortsov inside the Zvezda Service Module of the space station.

Skvortsov completed basic space training from January 1998 to November 1999. He was qualified as a test-cosmonaut in November, 1999. Starting January 2000 he was in International Space Station advanced training. In March 2008, Skvortsov was assigned to the Expedition 21/22 backup crew as a flight engineer and Soyuz TMA commander.

=== Expedition 23/24 ===
Skvortsov served as a flight engineer for the International Space Station (ISS) on Expedition 23. He traveled to the ISS aboard Soyuz TMA-18 along with fellow Russian cosmonaut Mikhail Korniyenko and NASA astronaut Tracy Caldwell-Dyson, on April 2, 2010, from the Baikonur Cosmodrome in Kazakhstan. He celebrated his 44 birthday in space aboard the ISS on May 6, 2010.

Skvortsov was the commander of the ISS Expedition 24. At the traditional "Change of Command" ceremony held on May 31, 2010, aboard the ISS Expedition 23 commander Oleg Kotov handed over his duties to Skvortsov.

Ending Expedition 24, the Soyuz TMA-18 spacecraft carrying Commander Alexander Skvortsov, Mikhail Kornienko, and NASA astronaut Tracy Caldwell-Dyson undocked from the space station at 10:02 p.m. EDT on September 24, 2010. Following a normal descent, the Soyuz crew landed at 5:23 a.m. GMT near Arkalyk, Kazakhstan on September 25.

After returning to Earth and sharing his experiences to an audience, Skvortsov said "I love spicy food, I make really hot chili sauce myself. I missed it badly. I finished off all the spicy ketchup stock on the ISS and shocked everyone by making and eating wasabi sandwiches. That's my fuel, as good as a rocket's".

=== Expedition 39/40 ===
Skvortsov returned to space aboard Soyuz TMA-12M, along with Oleg Artemyev and Steven Swanson, as a flight engineer on the Expedition 39 crew. The mission launched on March 25, 2014, and landed on September 11, 2014.

=== Expedition 60/61 ===
Skvortsov launched on July 20, 2019, and arrived to the International Space Station on the same day, joining the Expedition 60/61 crew.

== See also ==
- List of Heroes of the Russian Federation

Preceded by Oleg Kotov	ISS Expedition Commander; 1 June to 25 September 2010	Succeeded by Douglas H. Wheelock
