= Mikhail Kornienko =

Russian cosmonaut (born 1960)

- Михаил Корниенко
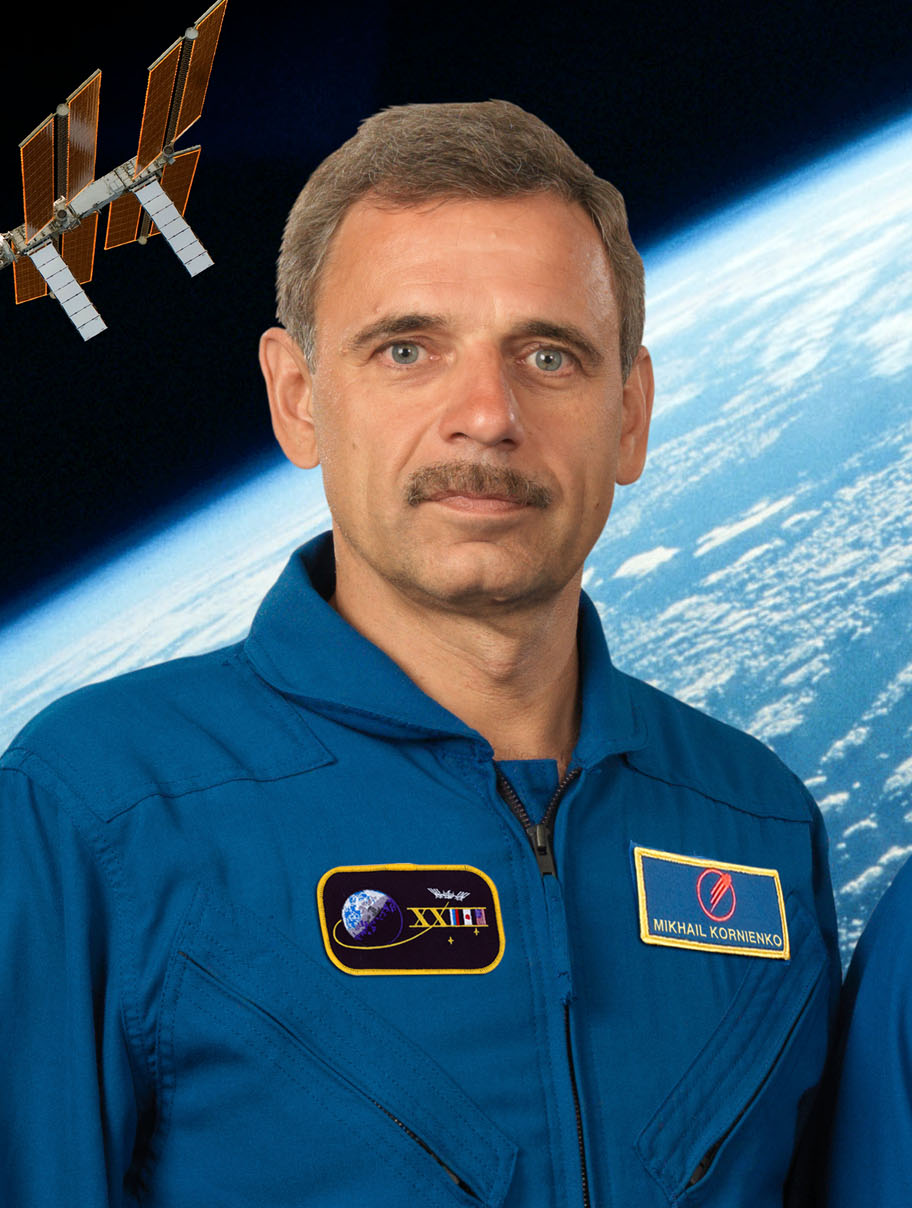
- Born: 15 April 1960 (age 66); Syzran, Kuibyshev (Samara) Region, Russian SFSR, Soviet Union
- Other name: Mikhail Borisovich Korniyenko
- Occupation: Engineer
- Space career

Roscosmos cosmonaut
- Status: Retired
- Time in space: 516d 10h 1m
- Selection: 1998 Cosmonaut Group
- Total EVAs: 2
- Total EVA time: 12 hours, 13 minutes
- Missions: Soyuz TMA-18 (Expedition 23/24), Soyuz TMA-16M/Soyuz TMA-18M (Expedition 43/44/45/46, ISS year-long mission)
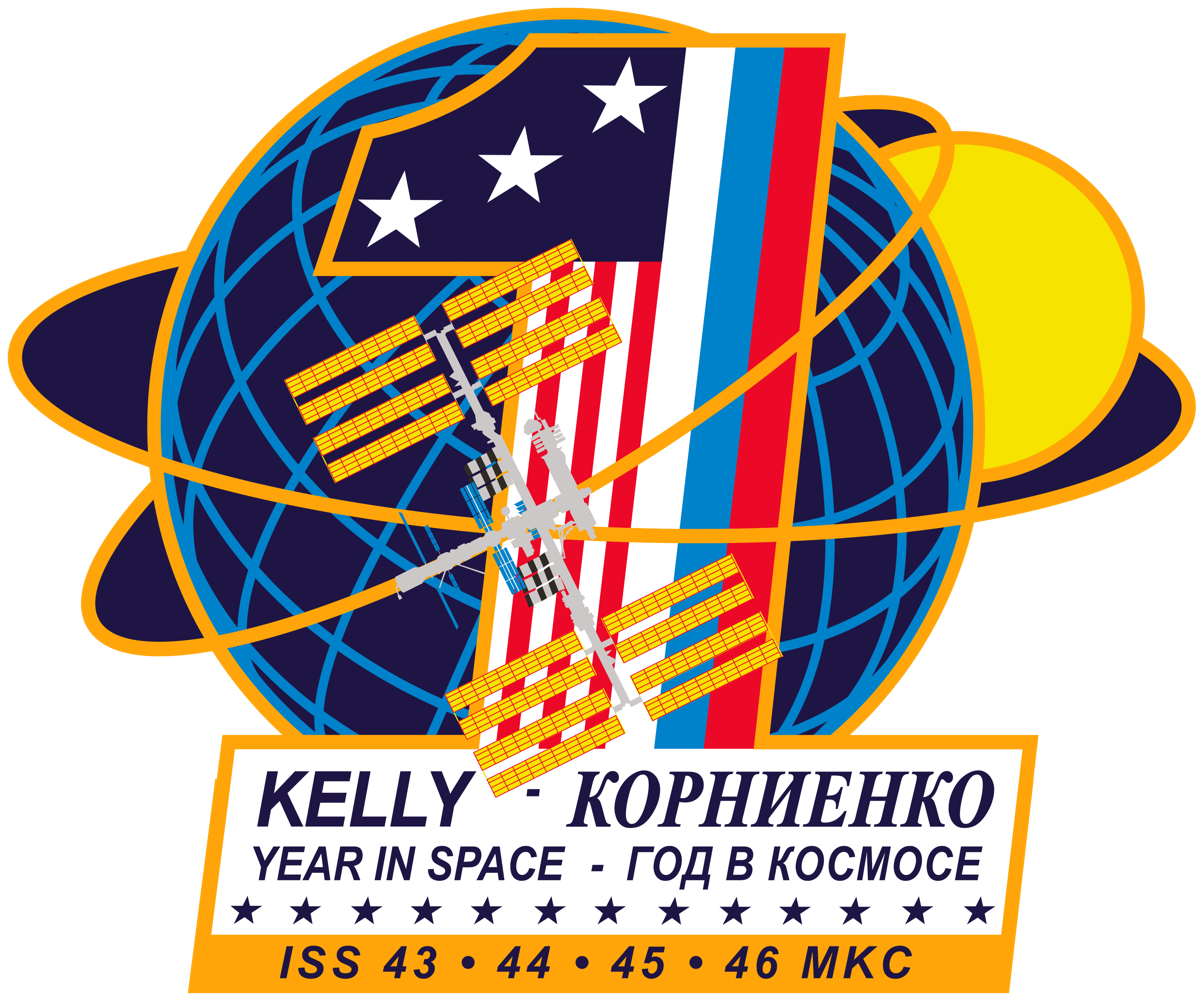
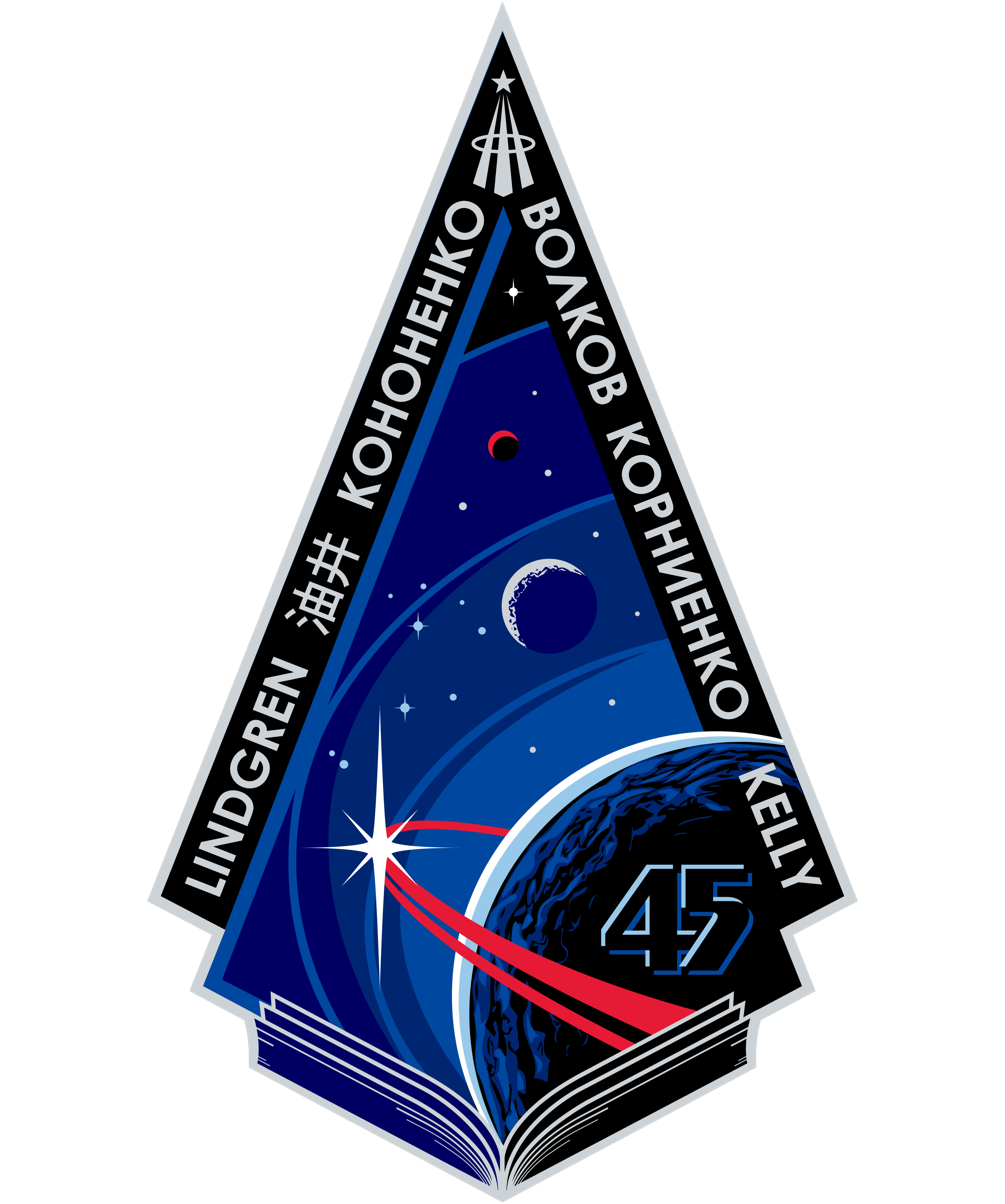
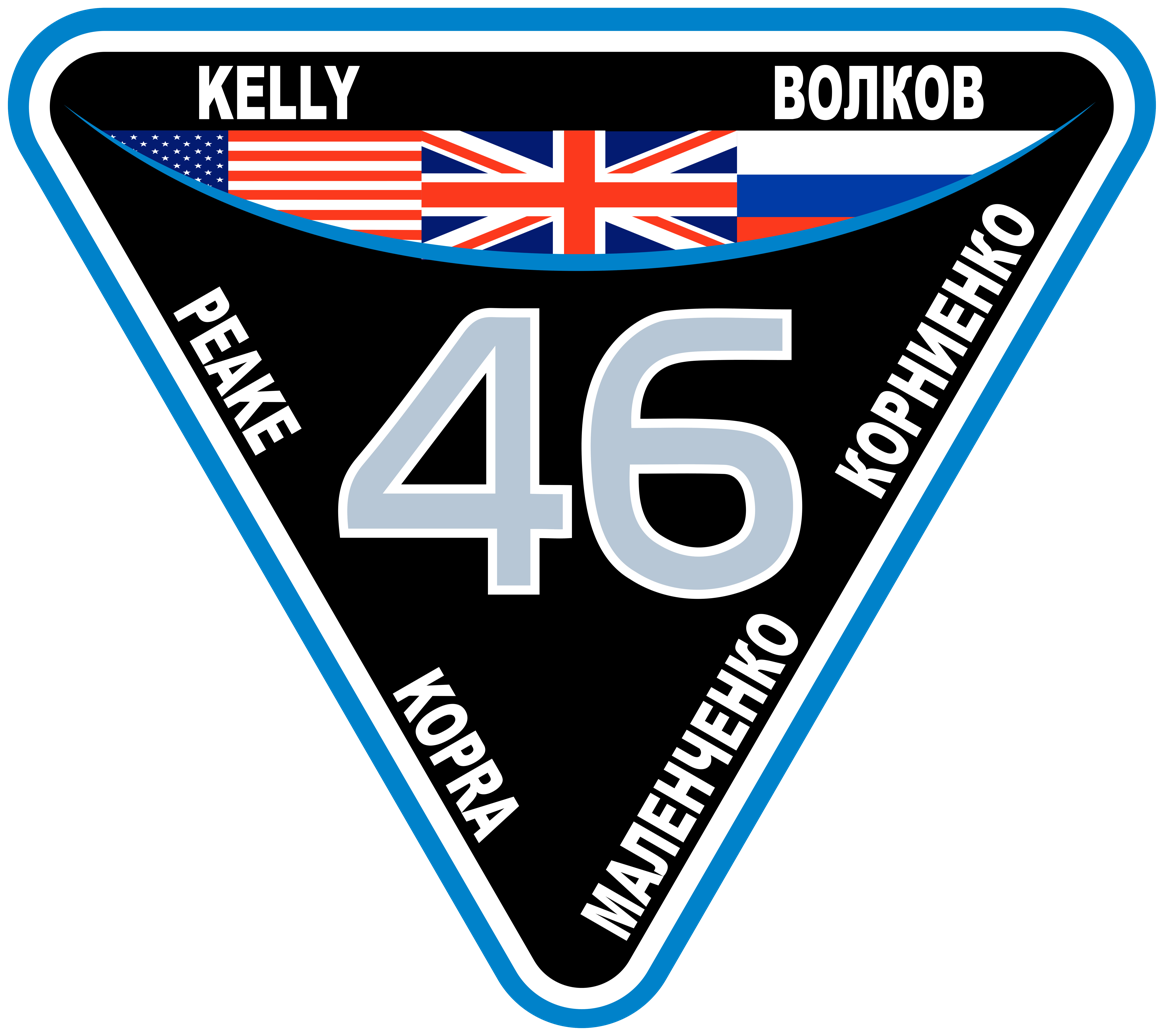
- Mission insignia
- Retired: December 1, 2017

Mikhail Borisovich Kornienko (Михаил Борисович Корниенко; born 15 April 1960) is a Russian cosmonaut who has undertaken multiple missions to the International Space Station (ISS).

He first served as a flight engineer during Expedition 23 and 24 in 2010. Kornienko was later selected for a year-long mission on the ISS that spanned from March 2015 to March 2016, covering Expedition 43 through 46. For this mission, he collaborated with American astronaut Scott Kelly. The mission, launched aboard Soyuz TMA-16M, aimed to study the physiological and psychological effects on humans during extended periods of spaceflight. The collected data are intended to aid preparations for future missions requiring extended human presence in space.

== Personal life ==
Kornienko was born in Syzran, Kuybyshev Oblast, Russian SFSR. He is married to Irina Kornienko, a doctor. They have a grown daughter. His father Boris G. Kornienko, a military pilot, perished in an Mi-6 helicopter crash in October 1965. His mother, Faina M. Kornienko, born in 1931 is retired.

== Education ==
Kornienko graduated from secondary school No. 15, Chelyabinsk, Russia, in 1977. From 1981 to 1987 he studied at the Moscow Aviation Institute named after S. Ordzhonikidze.

== Military career and experience ==
Upon graduation from school in 1977, he worked at a radio equipment plant in Chelyabinsk, Russia. In May 1978, Kornienko was called to service in the Soviet Army. He served in the Airborne Forces (VDV) in Kirovabad, Azerbaijan in the USSR. In May 1980, he completed his military service with the rank of junior sergeant. Kornienko worked for the Moscow Municipal Militsiya from 1980 to 1986. At the same time he attended the evening department of the Moscow Aviation Institute. Upon graduation in 1987 from the institute, he was qualified as a liquid propellant rocket engines mechanical engineer. He resigned from the Militsiya in 1986 and entered a mechanical engineering design bureau. During 1986 to 1991 Kornienko worked in the Baikonur Launch Facility as a launch equipment specialist.

He worked for commercial companies between late 1991 to early 1995. From October 1991 to December 1992 he was the OOO Transvostok Technical and Production Department Director. From January 1993 to April 1995 he was the LLC ESTE General Director. In October 1995, Kornienko started working at the Energia Rocket Space Corporation (RSC Energia) as an engineer. He was assigned to develop technical documentation for cosmonaut primary and backup crew tests and training. He took part in extravehicular activity (EVA) tests in simulated zero-gravity at the hydrolab and at the Selen dynamic stand. In the process of this work he acquired experience in organizing extravehicular repair/refurbishment and assembly activities on the Mir orbital station. He also directly participated in testing the Energia RSC production on the testing ground.

== Cosmonaut career ==
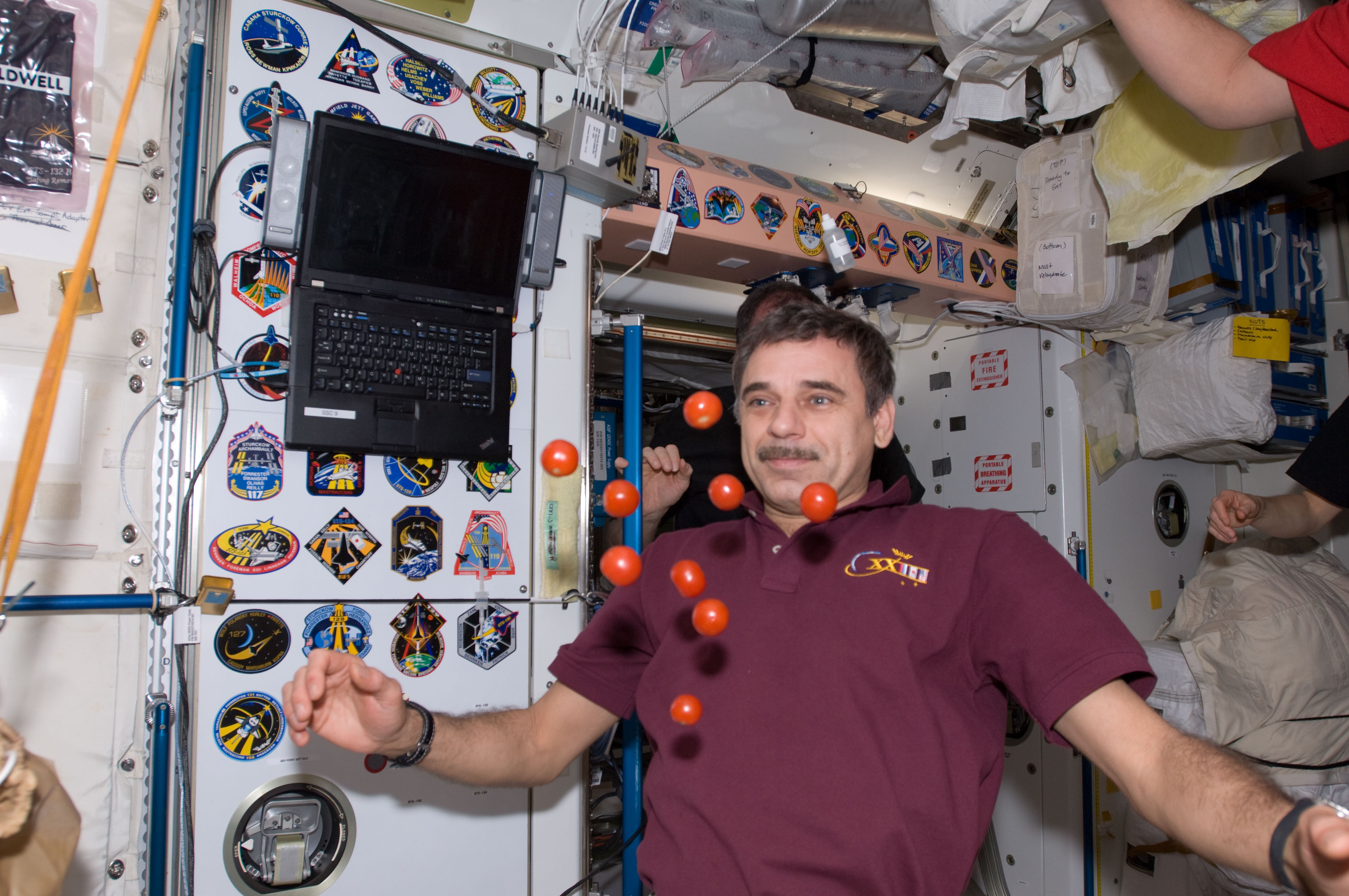
Mikhail Kornienko near floating tomatoes in the Unity Node of the ISS.

On 24 February 1998, Kornienko was selected as a test cosmonaut candidate and, in 1999, following basic training at the Yuri Gagarin Cosmonaut Training Center, he was qualified as a test cosmonaut. Since 1999, he has trained in the International Space Station group. He served on the ISS Expedition 8 backup crew as a flight engineer.

In 2005, he was assigned to the Soyuz TMA-10 and Expedition 15 back-up crew as Flight Engineer 1.

=== Expedition 23/24 ===
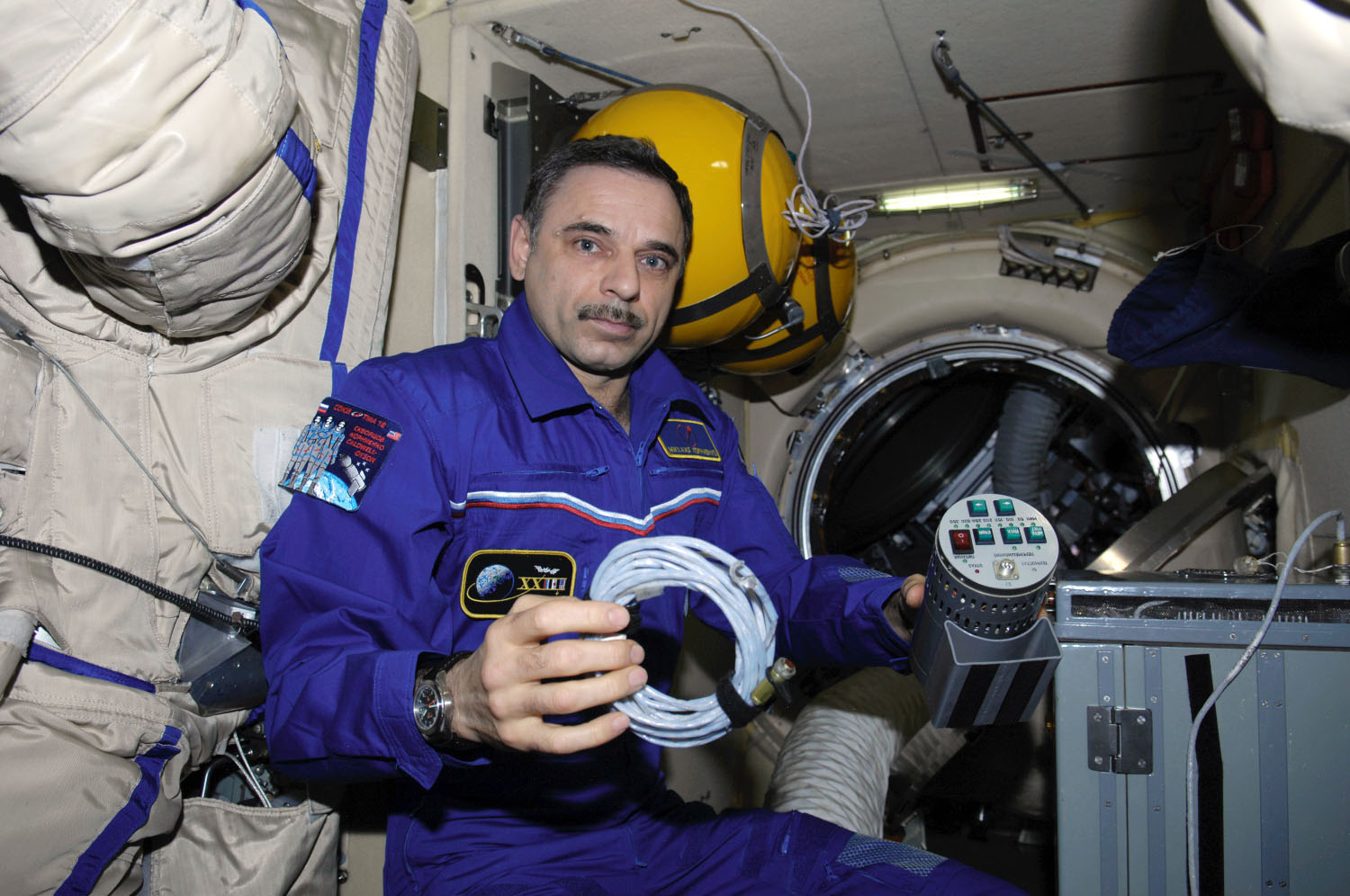
Kornienko services the Russian Bioemulsion experiment in the Pirs Docking Compartment.

Kornienko was aboard the space station as a Flight Engineer, being part of the Expedition 23/24 crew. He lifted off on 2 April 2010, along with fellow Russian cosmonaut Aleksandr Skvortsov and NASA astronaut Tracy Caldwell-Dyson aboard Soyuz TMA-18 from the Baikonur Cosmodrome.

Ending Expedition 24, the Soyuz TMA-18 spacecraft carrying Mikhail Kornienko, Alexander Skvortsov and NASA astronaut Tracy Caldwell-Dyson undocked from the space station at 10:02 pm EDT on 24 September 2010. Following a normal descent, the Soyuz crew landed at 5:23 am GMT ear Arkalyk, Kazakhstan on 25 September.

After returning to Earth and sharing his experiences to an audience, Kornienko said "The thing you miss there most of all is the Earth itself, I missed smells. I missed trees, I even dreamt of them. I even hallucinated. I thought I smelled a real fire and something being barbecued on it! I ended up putting pictures of trees on the walls to cheer up. You do miss the Earth there".

=== Spacewalks ===
On 27 July 2010, Kornienko and fellow Russian cosmonaut Fyodor Yurchikhin participated in a spacewalk outside the ISS. The two cosmonauts on 23 July put on their Orlan spacesuits and performed a dry run of the spacewalk activities. From inside the Pirs docking compartment they checked out the Orlan systems, practiced translation movements and tested their mobility. During the spacewalk, Kornienko and Yurchikhin outfitted the Rassvet module's (MRM1) Kurs automated rendezvous system, installed cables and remove and replaced a video camera. The spacewalk began at 04:11 UTC as Kornienko and Yurchikhin donned in Orlan spacesuits, depressurized the internal volume of the Pirs docking compartment airlock and ventured outside into space. It was the 25th Russian spacewalk performed from the station. At one point around 06:45 UTC the two spacewalkers accidentally lost an unidentified object that floated away from their perch on the side of the ISS. The cosmonauts speculated that the lost item was an attachment fixture to secure the cables in place once they are installed. About an hour later, another unidentified item, appeared to be a washer accidentally floated off. The spacewalk lasted six hours and 42 minutes.

=== ISS year long mission ===
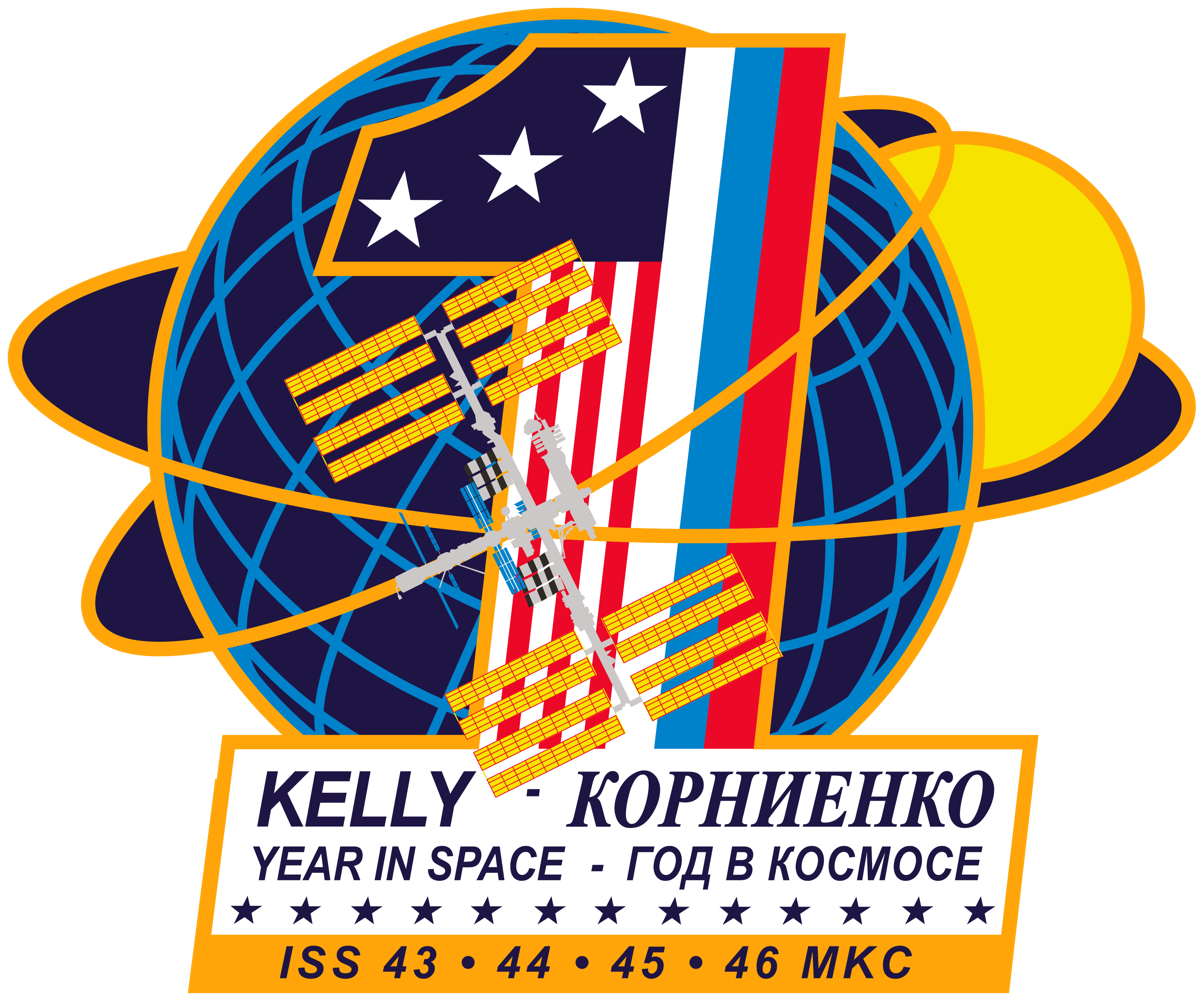
Patch for year long mission

In November 2012, NASA, the Russian Federal Space Agency (Roscosmos), and their international partners selected two veteran spacefarers for a one-year mission aboard the International Space Station in 2015. This mission included collecting scientific data important to future human exploration of the Solar System. NASA selected Scott Kelly, and Roscosmos chose Mikhail Kornienko. Kelly and Kornienko launched aboard a Russian Soyuz spacecraft from the Baikonur Cosmodrome in Kazakhstan in March 2015 and landed on 1 March 2016 at 22:00. Kelly and Kornienko already have a connection; Kelly was a backup crew member for the station's Expedition 23/24 crews, where Kornienko served as a flight engineer. The goal of their yearlong expedition aboard the orbiting laboratory was to understand better how the human body reacts and adapts to the harsh environment of space. Data from the 12-month expedition will help inform current assessments of crew performance and health and will determine better and validate countermeasures to reduce the risks associated with future exploration as NASA plans for missions around the Moon, an asteroid and ultimately Mars.

== Film ==
In 2016, Kornienko and Andrey Borisenko appeared as themselves in the comedy film Yolki 5.
