= Launch America =

Public-private partnership associated with the United States' return to human spaceflight

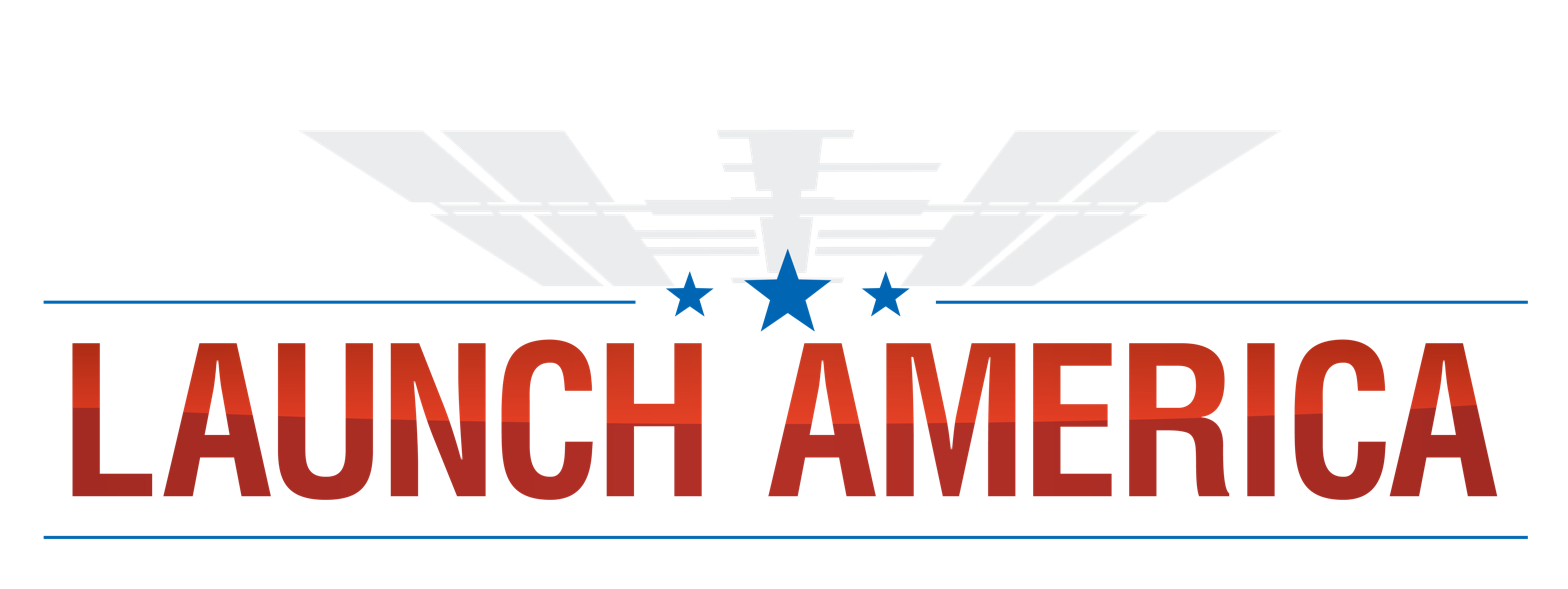
- Status: Active
- Genre: Long-term public-private partnership
- Country: United States
- Years active: 6
- Previous event: SpaceX Crew-10
- Next event: SpaceX Crew-11
- Organizer: NASA

Launch America is a public–private partnership between the United States and multiple space companies, closely related to NASA's Commercial Crew Program. The term "Launch America" was used as early as May 2016. The initiative aims to end NASA's reliance on Roscosmos by developing launch systems that can carry crews to space from American soil.

The first space launch under the "Launch America" banner occurred at the Demo-2 mission on 30 May 2020, successfully taking two astronauts to the International Space Station. This marked both the first launch of astronauts by a wholly commercial provider mission in the world, as well as the first crewed space launch by the U.S. in a decade, and the first ever crewed space launch by SpaceX.

== Flights ==
Mission and Patch	Capsule	Launch date	Landing date	Description	Crew	Outcome
Demo-2	Crew Dragon Endeavour	30 May 2020	2 August 2020	First space launch under "Launch America" banner. This marked both the first launch of astronauts by a wholly commercial provider mission in the world, and the first crewed space launch by the U.S. in a decade, as well as being the first ever crewed space launch by SpaceX.	(United States) Douglas Hurley; (United States) Robert Behnken	Success
SpaceX Crew-1	Crew Dragon Resilience	16 November 2020	2 May 2021	First operational Commercial Crew flight, second overall crewed orbital flight of Crew Dragon, flying four astronauts to the ISS for a six-month mission. Roscosmos had not yet certified the Crew Dragon vehicle, so a third NASA astronaut was added instead of a Russian cosmonaut. Broke the record for the longest spaceflight by a U.S. crew vehicle, previously held by the Skylab 4 mission. All members of this flight were part of the Expedition 64 crew.	(United States) Michael Hopkins; (United States) Victor Glover; (Japan) Soichi Noguchi; (United States) Shannon Walker	Success
SpaceX Crew-2	Crew Dragon Endeavour	23 April 2021	9 November 2021	Second operational Commercial Crew flight, third overall crewed orbital flight of Crew Dragon, transferring crew to the ISS for a six-month mission. NASA agreed to allow SpaceX to reuse a booster and capsule for the first time on this flight. It was the first NASA orbital flight to reuse a crewed vehicle since STS-135 in 2011. After spending almost 200 days in orbit, the Crew Dragon Endeavour set the record for the longest spaceflight by a U.S. crew vehicle previously set by her sibling Crew Dragon Resilience on May 2, 2021. All members of this flight were part of the Expedition 65 crew.	(United States) R. Shane Kimbrough; (United States) K. Megan McArthur (Note: Alongside the 3 other crew members, Megan McArthur is using the same seat of the SpaceX Crew Dragon Endeavour in this mission which her husband, Bob Behnken, used in SpaceX Demo-2 mission, the first mission of the Endeavour capsule.); (Japan) Akihiko Hoshide; (France) Thomas Pesquet (Note: The European Portion of SpaceX Crew-2 is called Mission Alpha, which is headed by Thomas Pesquet shown by the logo)	Success
SpaceX Crew-3	Crew Dragon Endurance	11 November 2021	6 May 2022	Third operational Commercial Crew flight, fifth overall crewed flight of Crew Dragon, transporting four astronauts to the ISS for a six-month mission. All members of this flight were part of the Expedition 66 and Expedition 67 crews.	(United States) Raja Chari; (United States) Thomas Marshburn; (United States) Kayla Barron; (Germany) Matthias Maurer (Note: The European Portion of SpaceX Crew-3 is called Mission Cosmic Kiss, which is headed by Matthias Maurer shown by the logo)	Success
SpaceX Crew-4	Crew Dragon Freedom	27 April 2022	14 October 2022	The fourth flight contracted under CCP contract and the seventh overall crewed flight of Crew Dragon. All members of this flight were part of the Expedition 67 and Expedition 68 crews.	(United States) Kjell Lindgren; (United States) Bob Hines; (Italy) Samantha Cristoforetti; (United States) Jessica Watkins	Success
SpaceX Crew-5	Crew Dragon Endurance	5 October 2022	18 March 2023	The fifth flight contracted under CCP contract and the eighth overall crewed orbital flight of Crew Dragon. The fourth astronaut is Russian cosmonaut, Anna Kikina, flying on this mission as a part of Dragon–Soyuz swap flights that ensures both countries would have a presence on the station, and the ability to maintain their separate systems, if either Soyuz or commercial crew vehicles are grounded for an extended period. All members of this flight are part of the Expedition 68 and Expedition 69 crews.	(United States) Nicole Aunapu Mann; (United States) Josh Cassada; (Japan) Koichi Wakata; (Russia) Anna Kikina	Success
SpaceX Crew-6	Crew Dragon Endeavour	2 March 2023	4 September 2023	The sixth flight contracted under CCP contract.	(United States) Stephen Bowen; (United States) Warren Hoburg; (United Arab Emirates) Sultan Al Neyadi; (Russia) Andrey Fedyaev	Success
SpaceX Crew-7	Crew Dragon Endurance	26 August 2023	12 March 2024	In late 2021, NASA contracted SpaceX for three more Commercial Crew Flights starting from Crew-7.	(United States) Jasmin Moghbeli; (Denmark) Andreas Mogensen; (Japan) Satoshi Furukawa; (Russia) Konstantin Borisov	Success
SpaceX Crew-8	Crew Dragon Endeavour	4 March 2024	25 October 2024	In late 2021, NASA contracted SpaceX for three more Commercial Crew Flights starting from Crew-7.	(United States) Matthew Dominick; (United States) Michael Barratt; (United States) Jeanette Epps; (Russia) Alexander Grebenkin	Success
Boeing Crew Flight Test (patch)	Starliner Calypso	5 June 2024	7 September 2024	The first crewed mission of Boeing Starliner. Landed uncrewed due to malfunctioning thrusters.	(United States) Barry Eugene Wilmore; (United States) Sunita Williams	Partial failure
SpaceX Crew-9	Crew Dragon Freedom	28 September 2024	19 March 2025	The ninth flight contracted under CCP contract and the fifteenth overall crewed flight of Crew Dragon. All members of this flight were part of the Expedition 72 crew.	(United States) Nick Hague; (Russia) Aleksandr Gorbunov	Success
SpaceX Crew-10	Crew Dragon Endurance	14 March 2025	July 2025	In May 2022, NASA contracted SpaceX for five more Commercial Crew Flights starting from Crew-10.	(United States) Anne McClain; (United States) Nichole Ayers; (Japan) Takuya Onishi; (Russia) Kirill Peskov	In Progress
SpaceX Crew-11	Crew Dragon Endeavour	1 August 2025	March 2026	In May 2022, NASA contracted SpaceX for five more Commercial Crew Flights starting from Crew-10.	(United States) Zena Cardman; (United States) Michael Fincke; (Japan) Kimiya Yui; (Russia) Oleg Platonov	In progress
Boeing Starliner-1	Starliner Spacecraft 2	TBD	TBD	First operational flight of Boeing Starliner.	(United States) Scott D. Tingle; TBA; (Canada) Joshua Kutryk; TBA	Planned
SpaceX Crew-12	TBA	TBA	TBA	In May 2022, NASA contracted SpaceX for five more Commercial Crew Flights starting from Crew-10.	TBA	Planned
SpaceX Crew-13	TBA	TBA	TBA	In May 2022, NASA contracted SpaceX for five more Commercial Crew Flights starting from Crew-10.	TBA	Planned
SpaceX Crew-14	TBA	TBA	TBA	In May 2022, NASA contracted SpaceX for five more Commercial Crew Flights starting from Crew-10.	TBA	Planned
