= Crew Dragon Endurance =

SpaceX Crew Dragon spacecraft

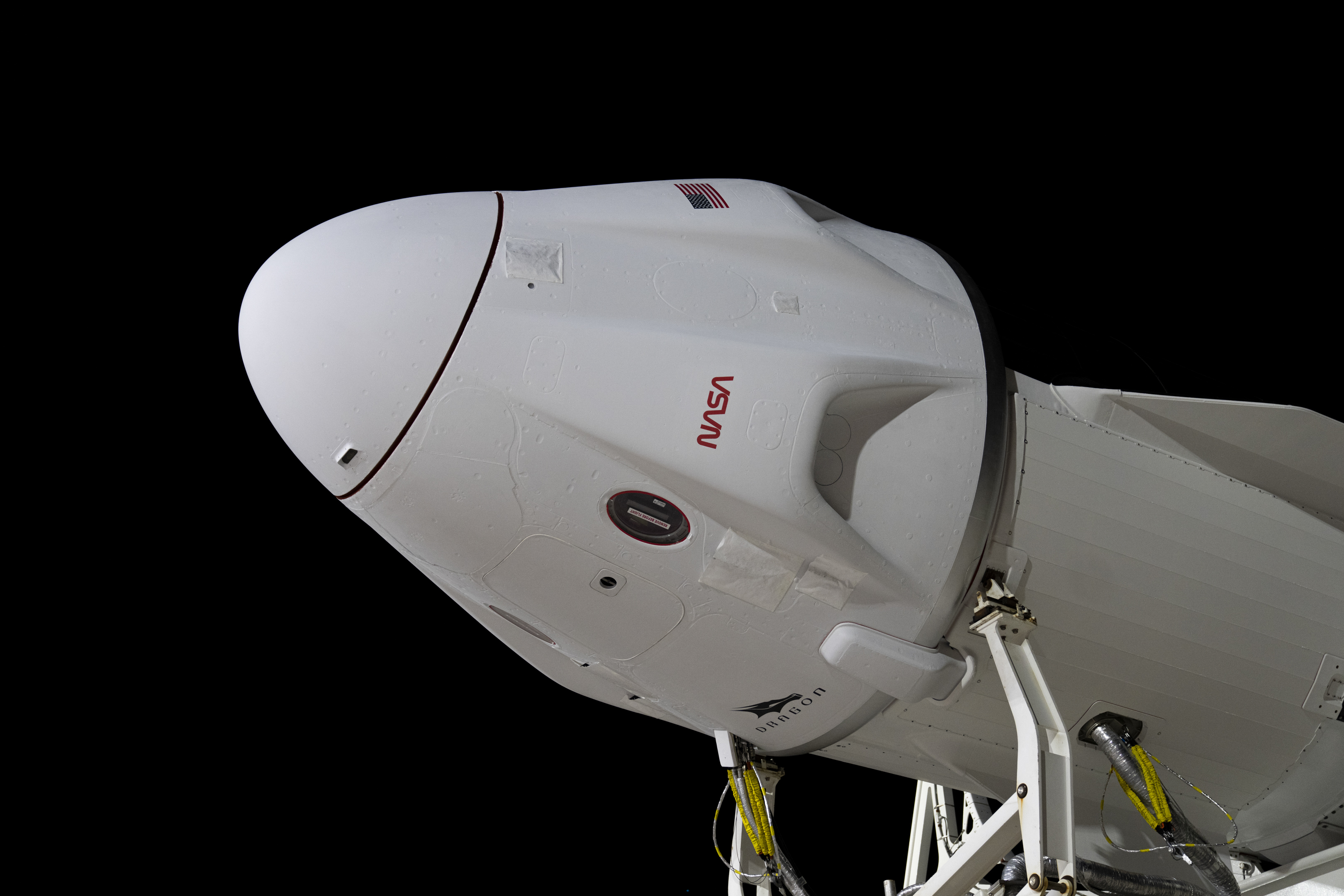
- Crew Dragon Endurance during rollout to pad 39A in October 2022.
- Type: Space capsule
- Class: Dragon 2
- Eponym: Endurance
- Serial no.: C210
- Owner: SpaceX
- Manufacturer: SpaceX

Specifications
- Dimensions: 4.4 m × 3.7 m (14 ft × 12 ft)
- Power: Solar panel
- Rocket: Falcon 9 Block 5

History
- Location: California
- First flight: 11 November 2021–6 May 2022; Crew-3
- Last flight: 14 March 2025 – 9 August 2025; Crew-10
- Flights: 4
- Flight time: 680 days, 7 hours, 28 minutes

Dragon 2s

Crew Dragon Endurance (serial number C210) is the third operational SpaceX Dragon 2 reusable spacecraft manufactured and operated by SpaceX. It first launched on 11 November 2021 to the International Space Station (ISS) on the SpaceX Crew-3 mission. It has subsequently been used for the Crew-5 mission launched in October 2022, the Crew-7 mission launched in August 2023, and the Crew-10 mission in March 2025. The capsule was named in honor of the SpaceX and NASA teams who worked to build the spacecraft during the COVID-19 pandemic and Endurance, the ship used by Shackleton's Imperial Trans-Antarctic Expedition.

== History ==
On 7 October 2021, it was announced that Dragon C210 would be called Endurance. Astronaut Raja Chari said that the name honors the SpaceX and NASA teams that built the spacecraft and trained the astronauts who will fly it. Those workers endured through a pandemic. The name also honors Endurance, the ship used by Shackleton's Imperial Trans-Antarctic Expedition. The three-masted vessel sank in 1915 after being bound in ice before reaching Antarctica and was found during the Crew-3 mission.

Endurance was first launched on 11 November 2021 (UTC) on a Falcon 9 Block 5 from the Kennedy Space Center (KSC), LC-39A, carrying NASA astronauts Raja Chari, Thomas Marshburn, and Kayla Barron, as well as ESA astronaut Matthias Maurer on a six-month mission to the International Space Station.

== Flights ==
List includes only completed or currently manifested missions. Dates are listed in UTC, and for future events, they are the earliest possible opportunities (also known as NET dates) and may change.

| Flight No. | Mission and Patch | Launch | Landing | Duration | Remarks | Crew | Outcome |
|---|---|---|---|---|---|---|---|
| 1 | Crew-3 | 11 November 2021, 02:03:31 | 6 May 2022, 04:43:23 | 176 days, 2 hours, 39 minutes | Long-duration mission. Ferried four members of the Expedition 66/67 crew to the ISS. | Raja Chari; Thomas Marshburn; Kayla Barron; Matthias Maurer | Success |
| 2 | Crew-5 | 5 October 2022, 16:00:57 | 12 March 2023, 02:02 | 157 days, 10 hours, 1 minute | Long-duration mission. Ferried four members of the Expedition 68 crew to the ISS. | Nicole Aunapu Mann; Josh A. Cassada; Koichi Wakata; Anna Kikina | Success |
| 3 | Crew‑7 | 26 August 2023, 07:27:27 | 12 March 2024, 09:47 | 199 days, 2 hours, 19 minutes | Long-duration mission. Ferried four members of the Expedition 69/70 crew to the ISS. | Jasmin Moghbeli; Andreas Mogensen; Satoshi Furukawa; Konstantin Borisov | Success |
| 4 | Crew-10 | 14 March 2025, 23:03:48 | 9 August 2025, 15:33:20 | 147 days, 16 hours, 29 minutes | Long-duration mission. Ferried four Expedition 72/73 crew members to the ISS. | Anne McClain; Nichole Ayers; Takuya Onishi; Kirill Peskov | Success |

== Gallery ==
Crew Dragon Endurance Gallery

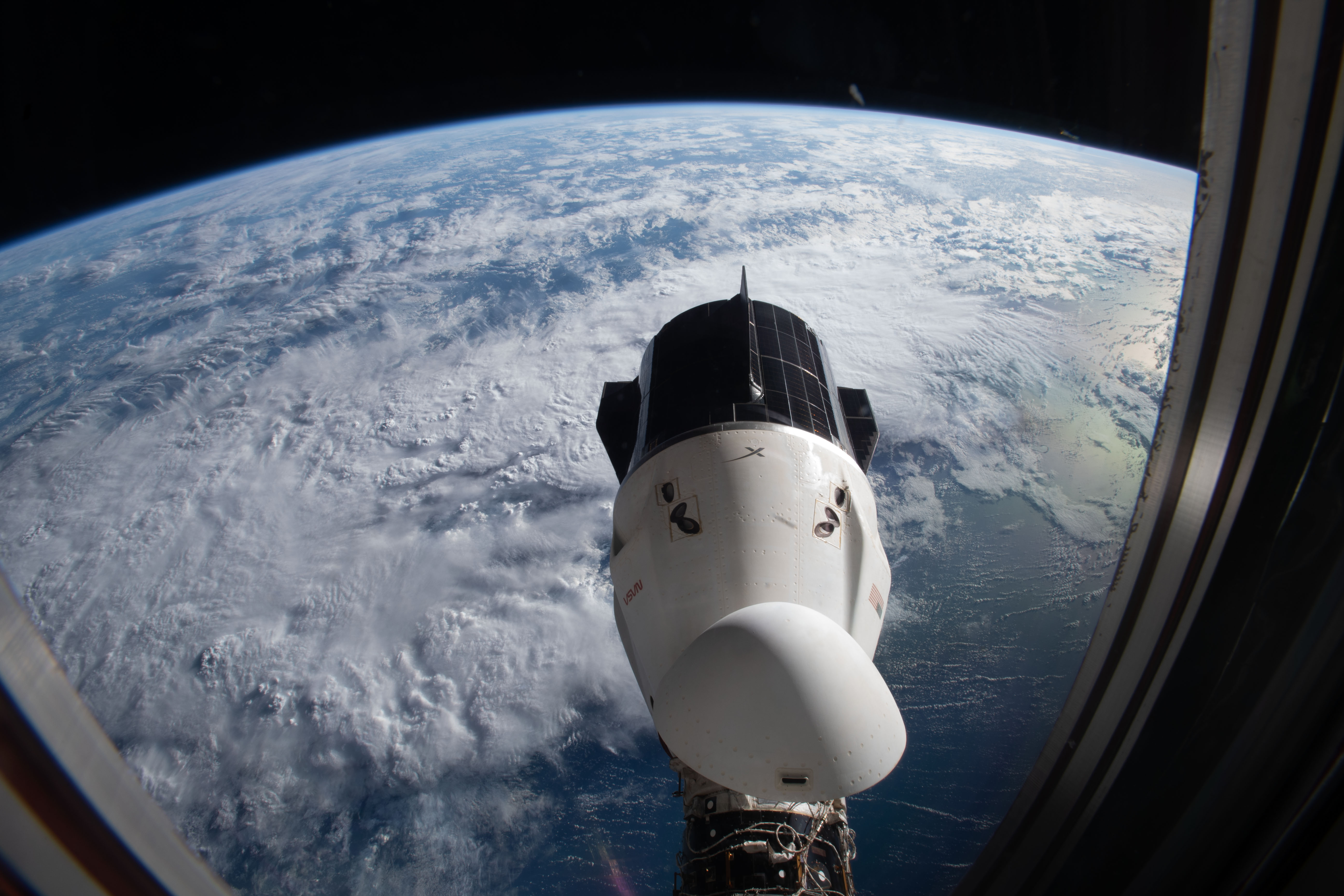
Crew Dragon Endurance docked to the ISS on the Crew-3 mission

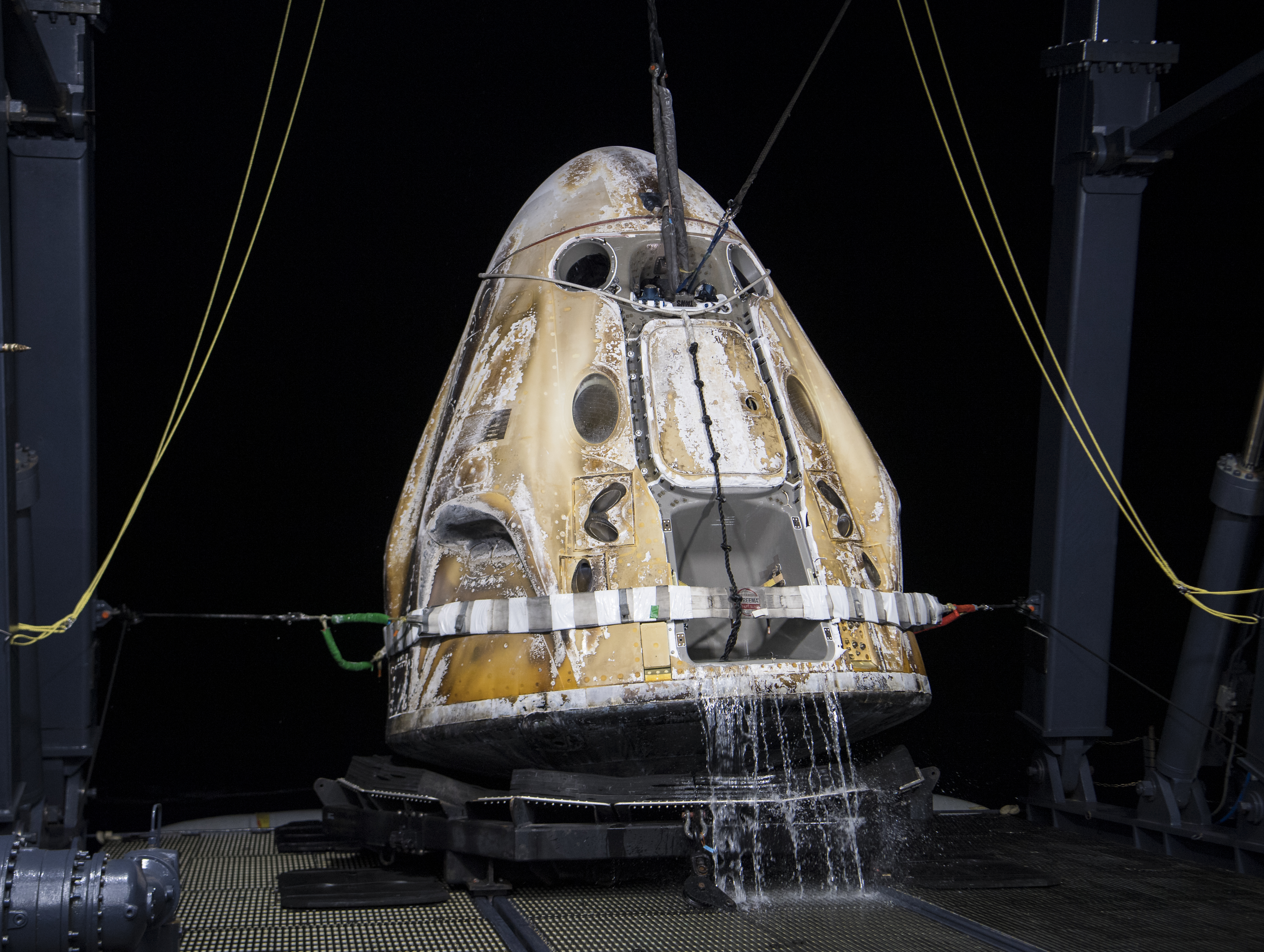
Endurance splashdown to the Atlantic Ocean after the end of the Crew-3 mission
