= Paul Tipton =

Paul Tipton may refer to:

- Paul Tipton (cricketer)
- Paul Tipton (physicist)
