= SpaceX Crew-10 =

2025 American crewed spaceflight to the ISS

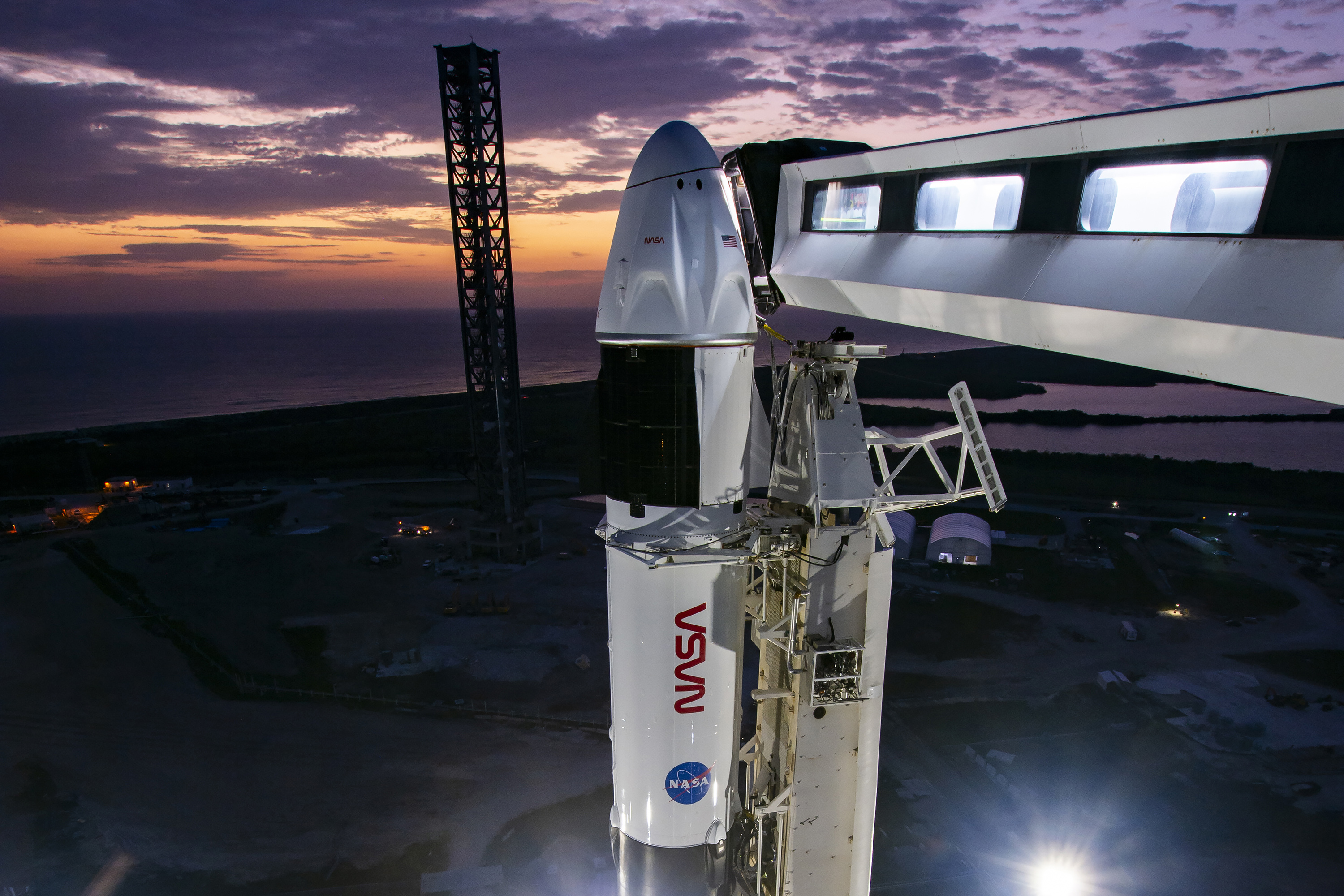
- Crew Dragon Endurance awaits takeoff at LC-39A
- Names: USCV-10
- Mission type: ISS crew transport
- Operator: SpaceX
- COSPAR ID: 2025-049A
- SATCAT no.: 63204
- Mission duration: 147 days, 16 hours, 29 minutes

Spacecraft properties
- Spacecraft: Crew Dragon Endurance
- Spacecraft type: Crew Dragon
- Manufacturer: SpaceX

Crew
- Crew size: 4
- Members: Anne McClain; Nichole Ayers; Takuya Onishi; Kirill Peskov
- Expedition: Expedition 72/73

Start of mission
- Launch date: March 14, 2025, 23:03:48 UTC (7:03:48 PM EDT)
- Rocket: Falcon 9 Block 5 (B1090‑2), Flight 446
- Launch site: Kennedy, LC-39A

End of mission
- Recovered by: MV Shannon
- Landing date: August 9, 2025 15:33:44 UTC (8:33:44 AM PDT)
- Landing site: Pacific Ocean near San Diego (32.5°N 117.7°W)

Orbital parameters
- Reference system: Geocentric orbit
- Regime: Low Earth orbit
- Perigee altitude: 151 km (94 mi)
- Apogee altitude: 200 km (120 mi)
- Inclination: 51.65°

Docking with ISS
- Docking port: Harmony forward
- Docking date: March 16, 2025, 04:04:52 UTC
- Undocking date: August 8, 2025, 22:15 UTC
- Time docked: 145 days, 18 hours, 10 minutes
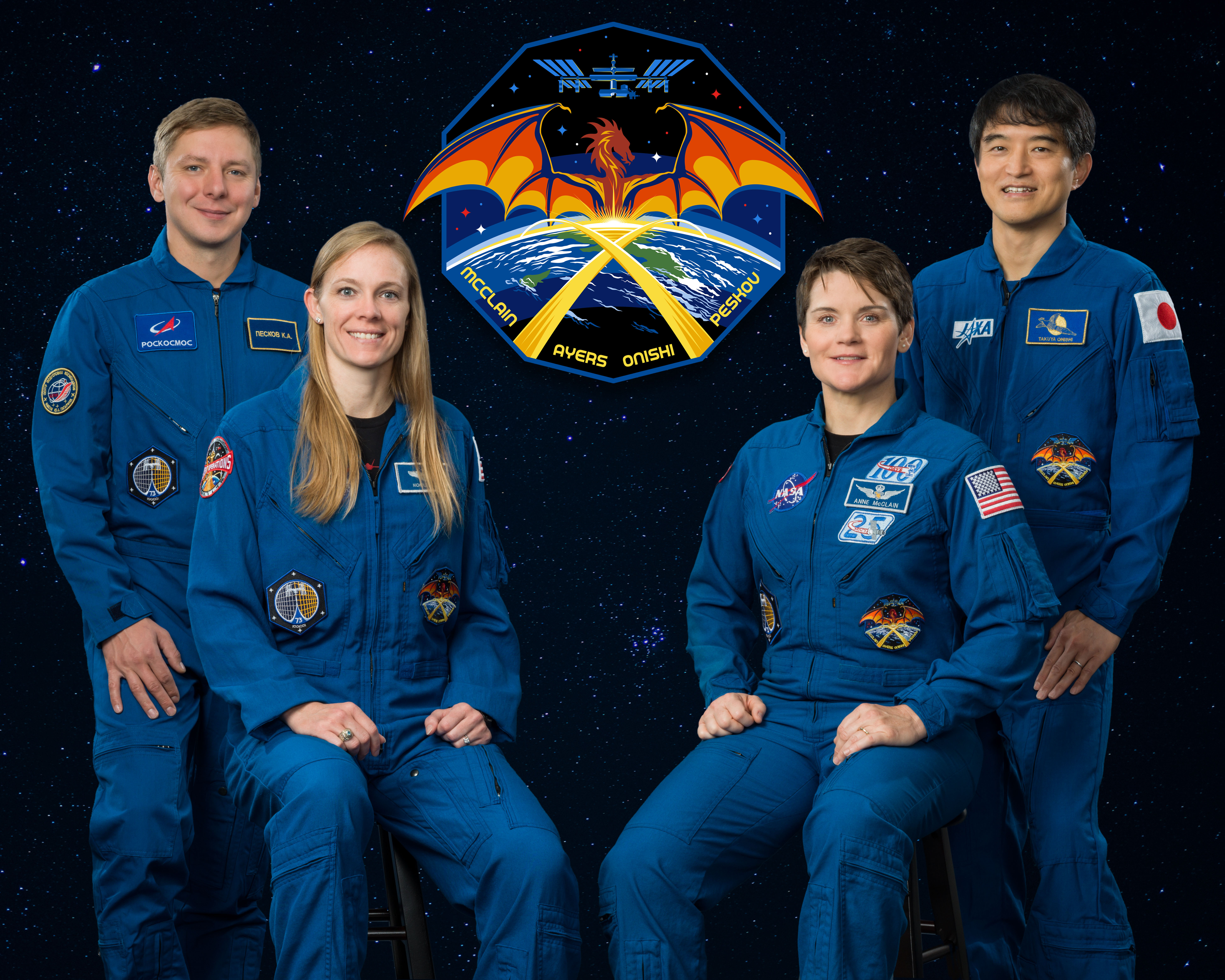
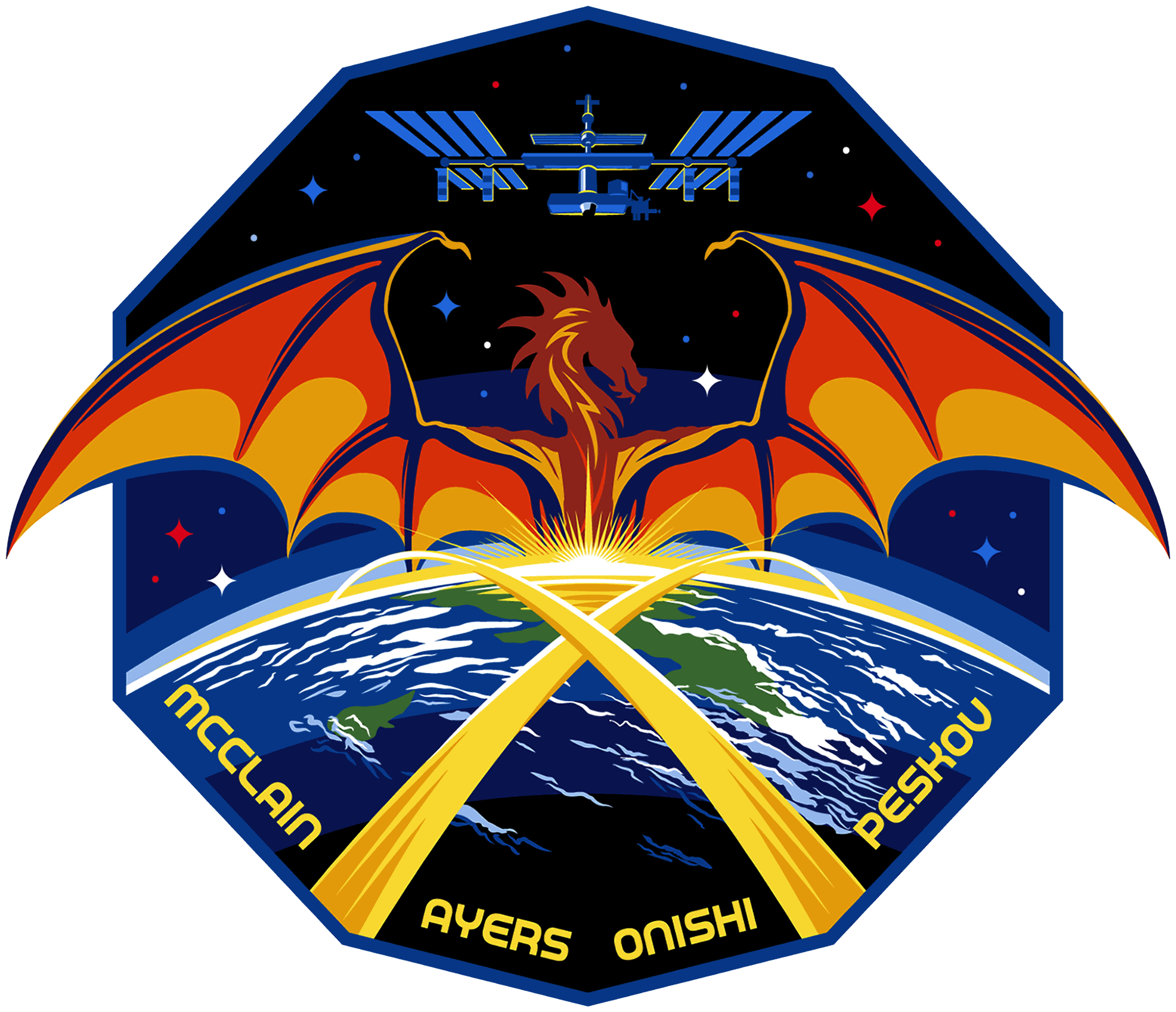
- NASA (left), SpaceX (middle), and JAXA (right) mission patches From left: Peskov, Ayers, McClain, and Onishi Commercial Crew Program Crew Dragon flights

SpaceX Crew-10 was the tenth operational NASA Commercial Crew Program flight and the 16th crewed orbital flight of a Crew Dragon spacecraft. The mission transported four crew members — NASA astronauts Anne McClain and Nichole Ayers, JAXA astronaut Takuya Onishi, and Roscosmos cosmonaut Kirill Peskov — to the International Space Station (ISS). The mission launched on March 14, 2025, 23:03:48 UTC (7:03:48 PM EDT) from Launch Complex 39A at Kennedy Space Center.

== Crew ==
Prime crew
| Position | Crew |
|---|---|
| Commander | Anne McClain, NASA; Expedition 72/73; Second spaceflight |
| Pilot | Nichole Ayers, NASA; Expedition 72/73; First spaceflight |
| Mission specialist | Takuya Onishi, JAXA; Expedition 72/73; Second spaceflight |
| Mission specialist | Kirill Peskov, Roscosmos; Expedition 72/73; First spaceflight |

Backup crew
| Position | Crew |
|---|---|
| Mission specialist | Oleg Platonov, Roscosmos |

== Mission ==
| Attempt | Planned | Result | Turnaround | Reason | Decision point | Weather go (%) | Notes |
|---|---|---|---|---|---|---|---|
| 1 | 12 Mar 2025, 7:48:56 pm | Scrubbed | — | Technical | 12 Mar 2025, 7:04 pm (T−00:44:00) | >95 | Ground equipment hydraulic problem. |
| 2 | 14 Mar 2025, 7:03:48 pm | Success | 1 day 23 hours 15 minutes | | | >95 | |

The tenth SpaceX operational mission in the Commercial Crew Program was initially scheduled for launch in February 2025. This mission was to see the maiden flight of Crew Dragon Grace, the fifth and potentially final Crew Dragon spacecraft. The launch was ultimately postponed by one month to late March 2025 to allow SpaceX and NASA to complete final testing and integration of the new spacecraft. However, because NASA believed that C213 would not be ready for its debut launch until late April, the mission was reassigned to Crew Dragon Endurance, allowing the launch date to be moved up to earlier in March.

The launch attempt on March 12, 2025 was scrubbed about 44 minutes before the planned liftoff time due to a suspected pocket of air trapped in the hydraulics on one of the clamps on the strongback that restrains and stabilizes the second stage of the Falcon 9 rocket while it stands vertically on the launch pad before launch.

The mission ended with a splashdown in the Pacific Ocean on August 9, 2025.

== Gallery ==
SpaceX Crew-10
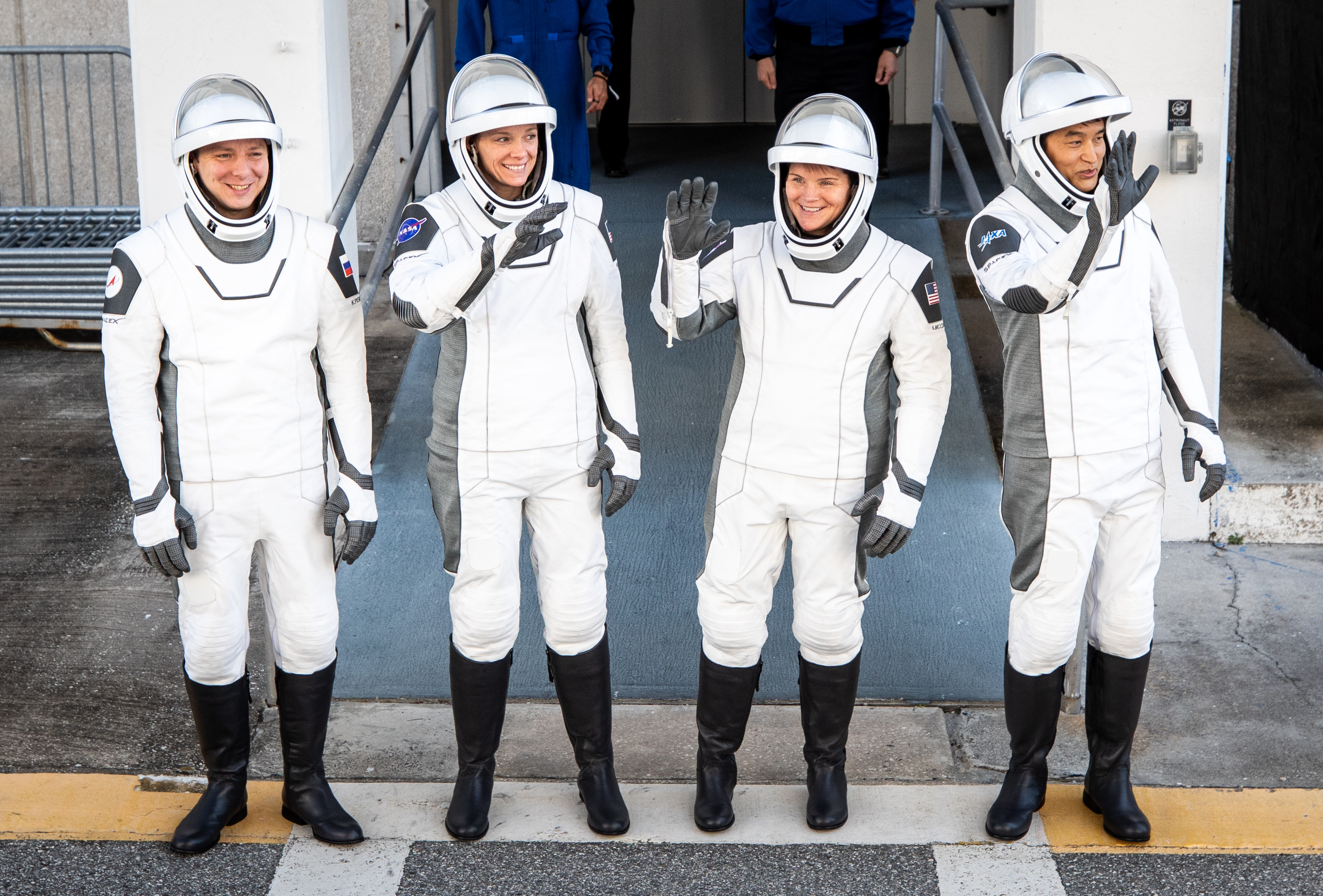
Crew-10 astronauts walk out from the O&C Building

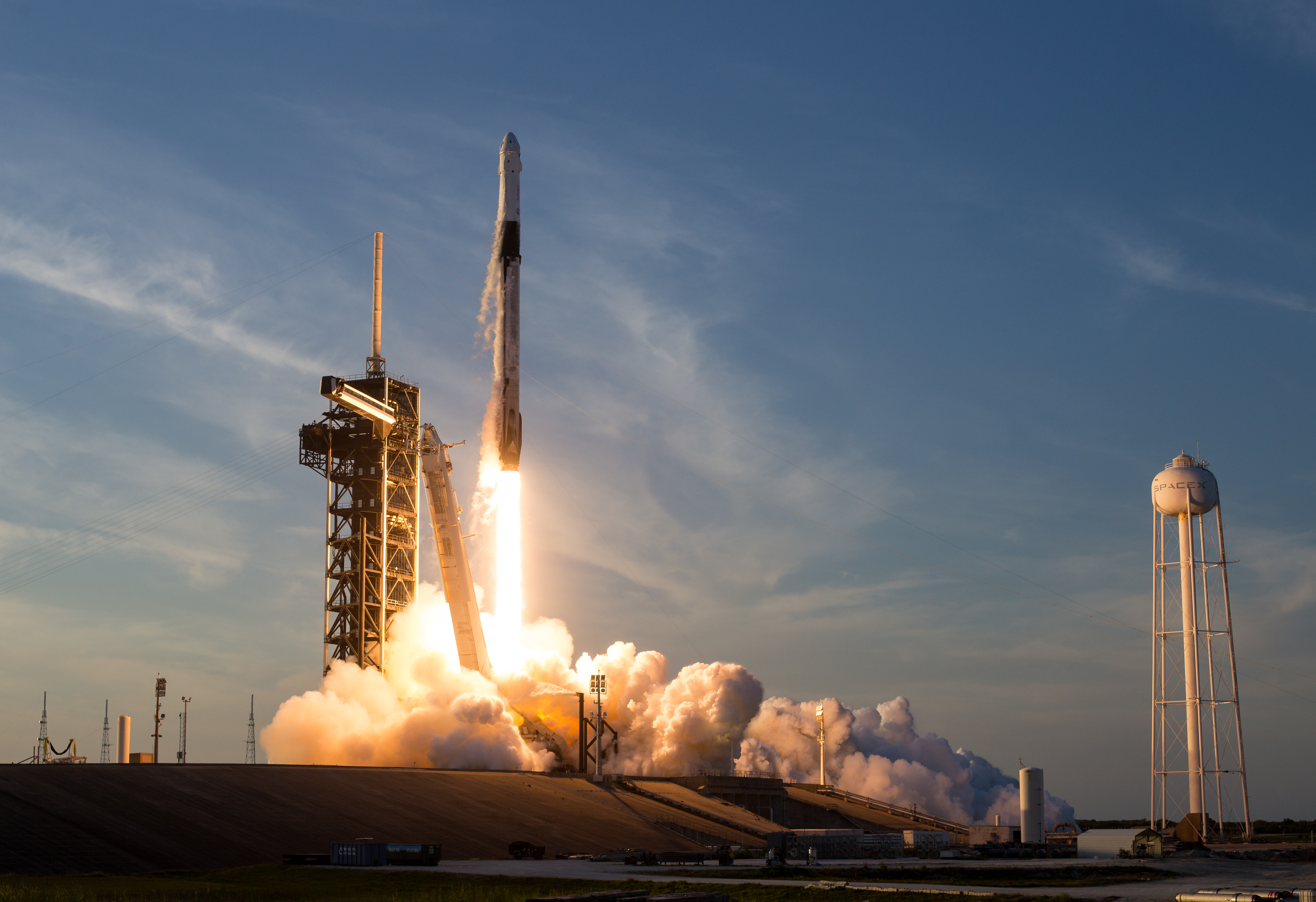
Crew Dragon Endurance lifts off from LC-39A

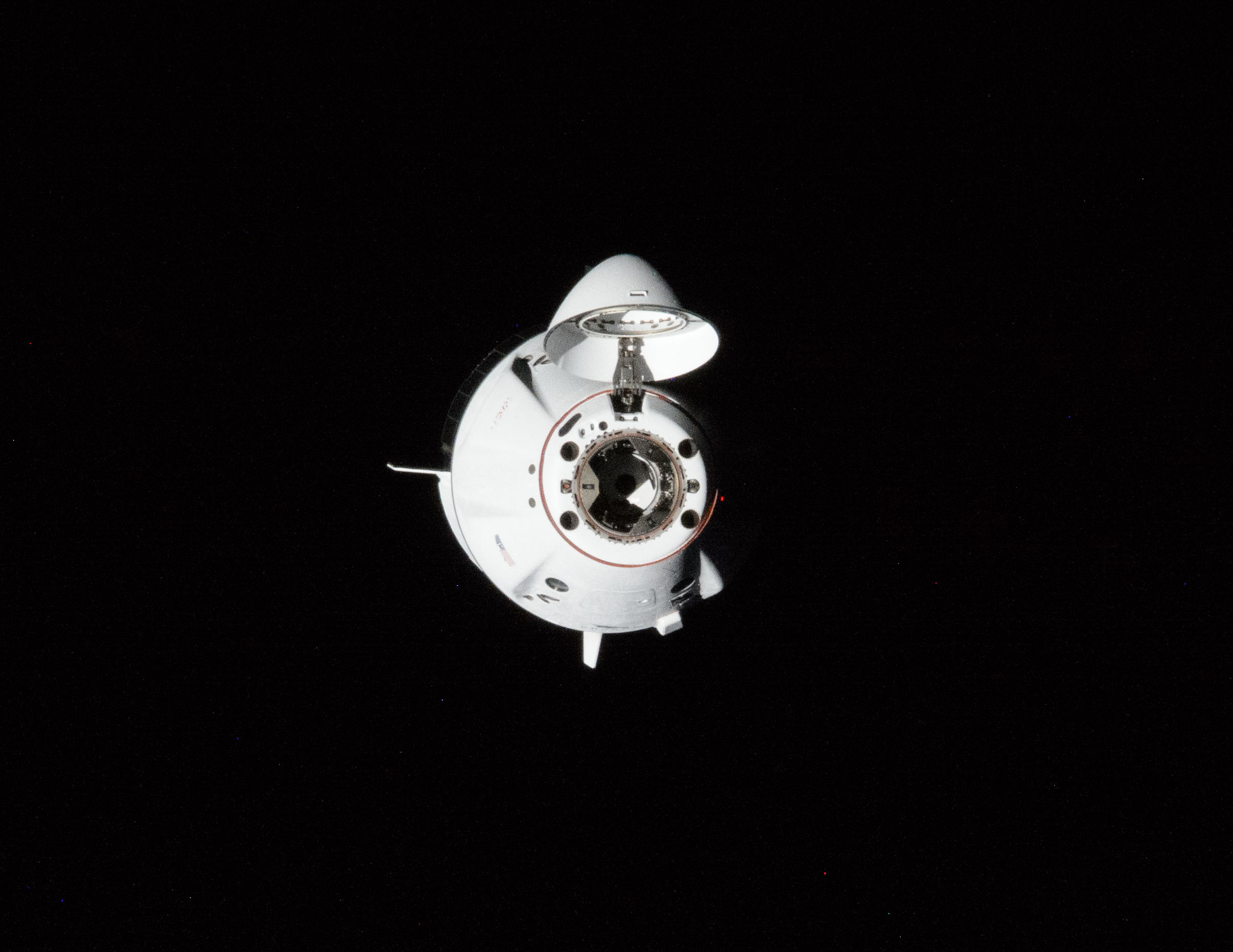
Crew Dragon Endurance approaches the ISS
