= SpaceX Crew-7 =

2023 American crewed spaceflight to the ISS

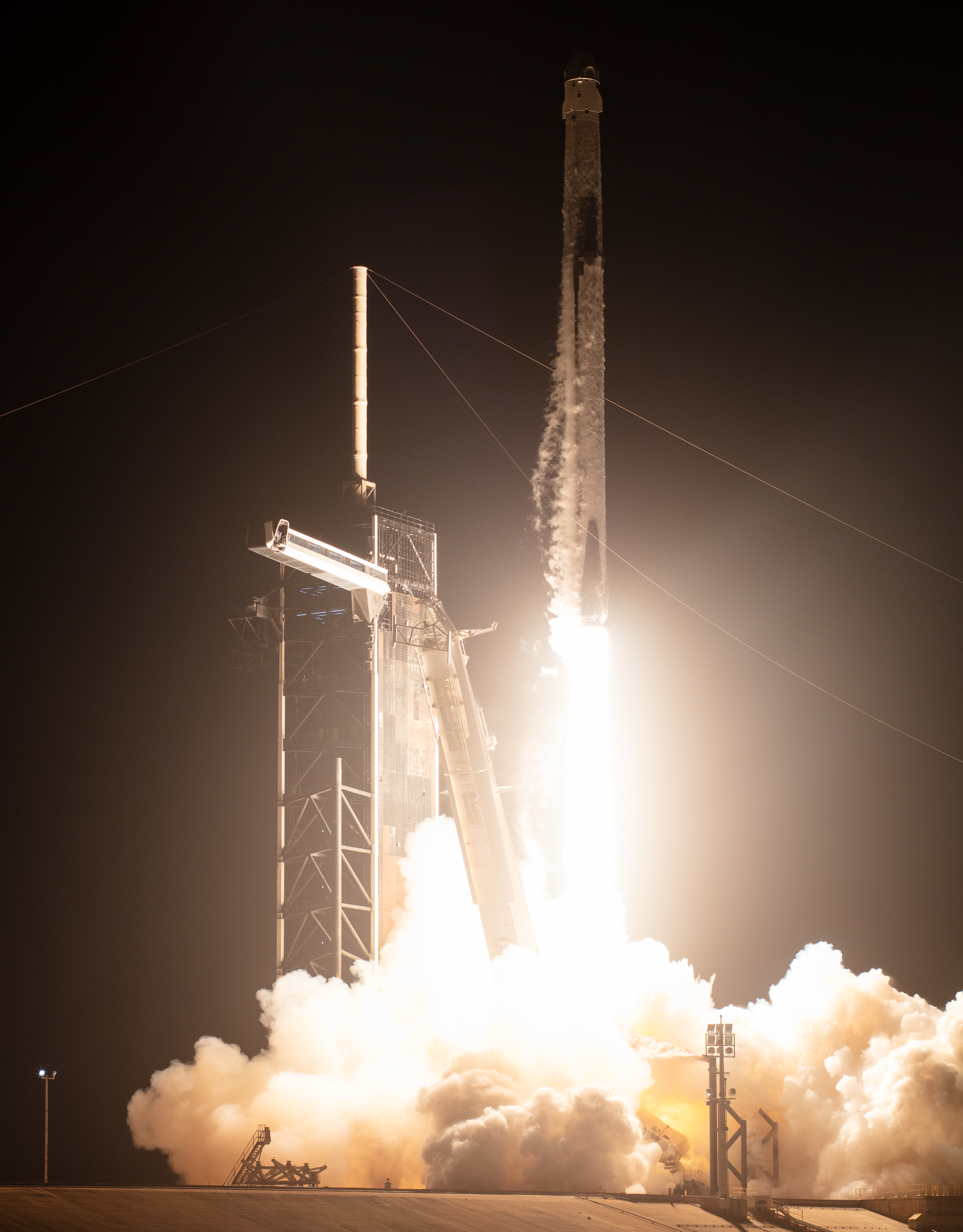
- Endurance launches to the ISS with Crew-7 onboard
- Names: USCV-7
- Mission type: ISS crew transport
- Operator: SpaceX
- COSPAR ID: 2023-128A
- SATCAT no.: 57697
- Mission duration: 199 days, 2 hours, 19 minutes

Spacecraft properties
- Spacecraft: Crew Dragon Endurance
- Spacecraft type: Crew Dragon
- Manufacturer: SpaceX
- Launch mass: 12,519 kg (27,600 lb)
- Landing mass: 9,616 kg (21,200 lb)

Crew
- Crew size: 4
- Members: Jasmin Moghbeli; Andreas Mogensen; Satoshi Furukawa; Konstantin Borisov
- Expedition: Expedition 69/70

Start of mission
- Launch date: August 26, 2023, 07:27:27 UTC (3:27:27 am EDT)
- Rocket: Falcon 9 Block 5 (B1081‑1), Flight 249
- Launch site: Kennedy, LC‑39A

End of mission
- Recovered by: MV Megan
- Landing date: March 12, 2024, 09:47 UTC (5:47 am EDT)
- Landing site: Gulf of Mexico, near Pensacola, Florida

Orbital parameters
- Reference system: Geocentric orbit
- Regime: Low Earth orbit
- Inclination: 51.66°

Docking with ISS
- Docking port: Harmony zenith
- Docking date: August 27, 2023, 13:16 UTC
- Undocking date: March 11, 2024, 15:20 UTC
- Time docked: 197 days, 2 hours, 4 minutes
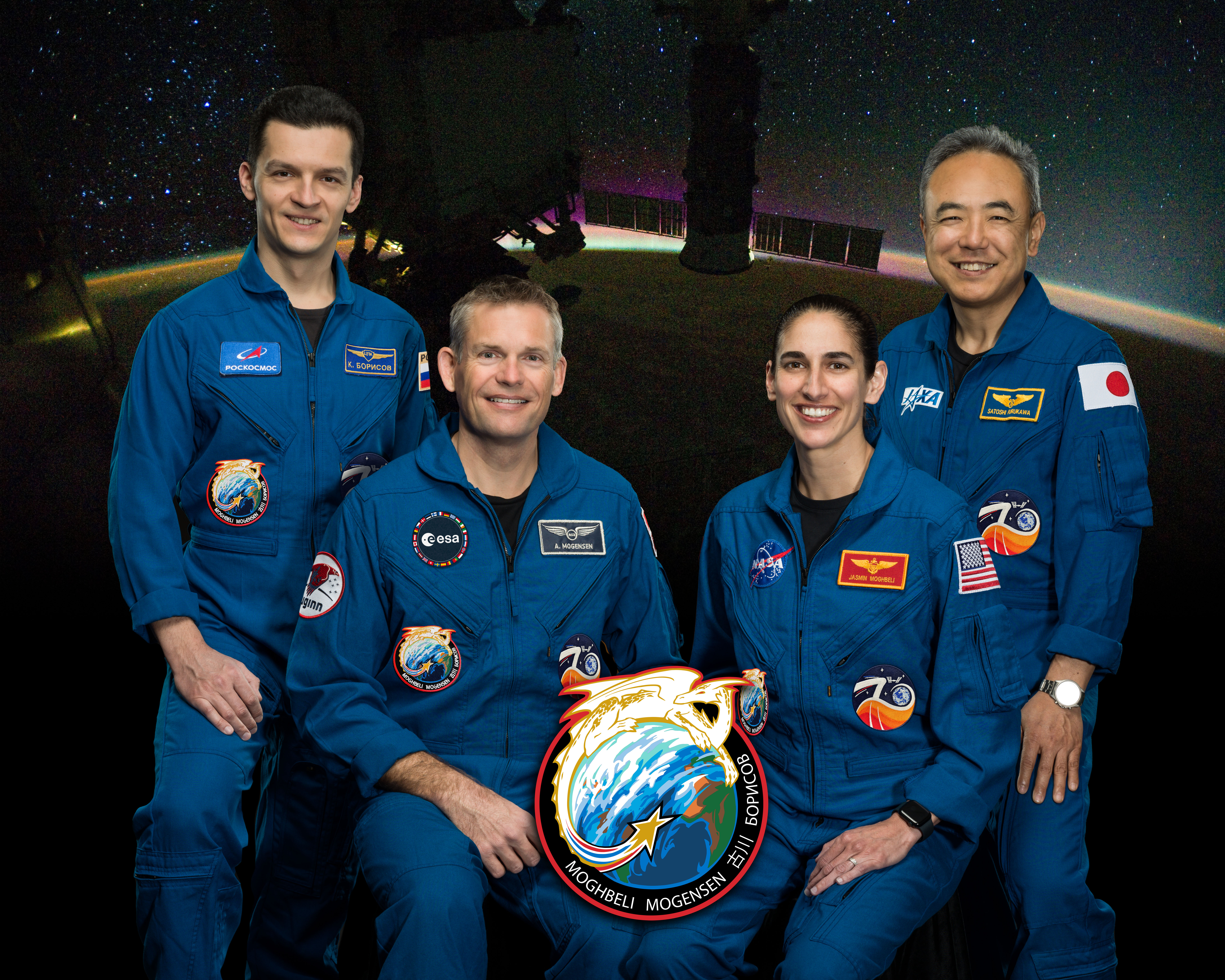
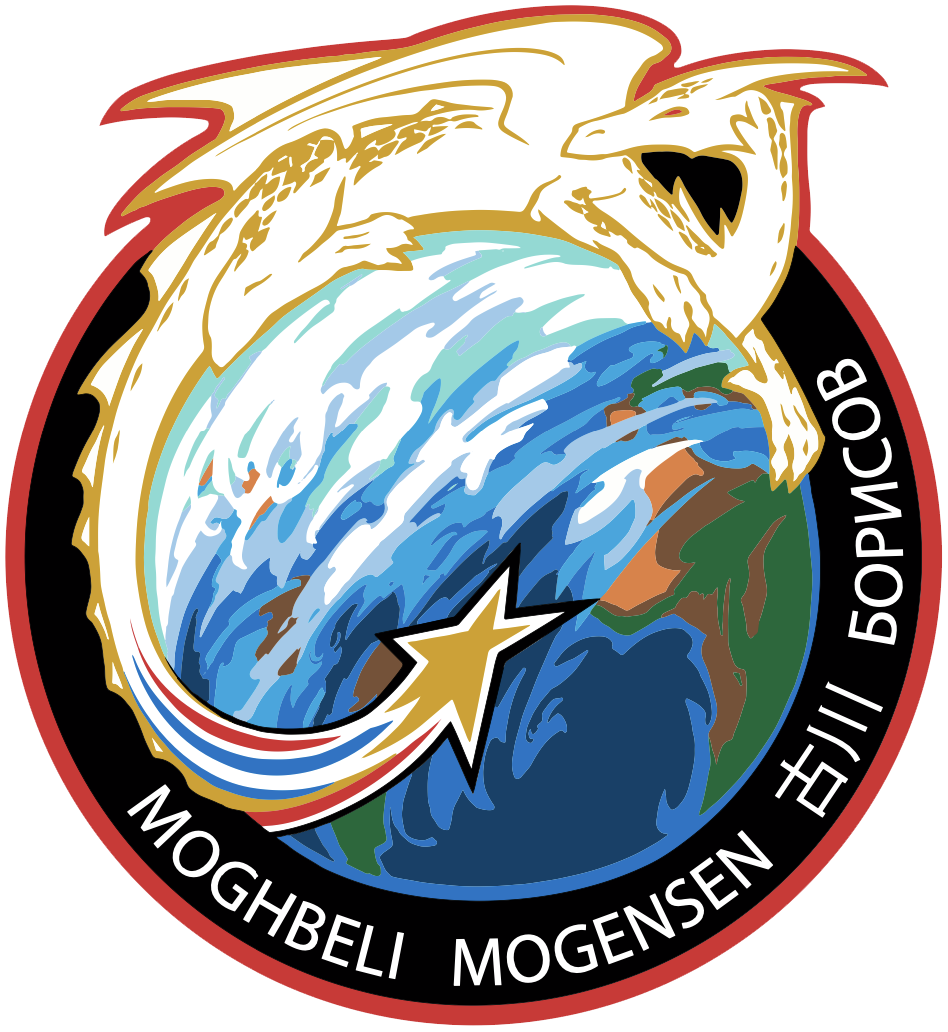
- From top to bottom, left to right: NASA, SpaceX, ESA, and JAXA mission patches From left: Borisov, Mogensen, Moghbeli and Furukawa Commercial Crew Program Crew Dragon flights

SpaceX Crew-7 was the seventh crewed operational NASA Commercial Crew flight and the eleventh overall crewed orbital flight of a Crew Dragon spacecraft. The mission launched on August 26, 2023, transporting four crew members to the International Space Station (ISS), consisting of one NASA astronaut Jasmin Moghbeli, one ESA astronaut Andreas Mogensen of Denmark, one JAXA astronaut Satoshi Furukawa, and one Roscosmos cosmonaut Konstantin Borisov. Mogensen was the first non-American to serve as a pilot of Crew Dragon.

== Crew ==
Prime crew
Position	Astronaut
Commander	Jasmin Moghbeli, NASA; Expedition 69/70; First spaceflight
Pilot	Andreas Mogensen, ESA; Expedition 69/70; Second spaceflight
Mission specialist	Satoshi Furukawa, JAXA; Expedition 69/70; Second and last spaceflight
Mission specialist	Konstantin Borisov, Roscosmos; Expedition 69/70; First spaceflight

Backup crew
Position	Astronaut
Commander	Matthew Dominick, NASA
Pilot	Michael Barratt, NASA
Mission specialist	Jeanette Epps, NASA
Mission specialist	Alexander Grebenkin, Roscosmos

== Mission ==
The seventh SpaceX operational mission in the Commercial Crew Program launched on August 26, 2023. The European segment of the mission is called Huginn, named after the raven from Norse mythology of the same name.

One week after the arrival of Crew-8, Crew-7 undocked from the ISS, returning to Earth by splashing down in the Gulf of Mexico near Florida on March 12, 2024.

== Gallery ==
SpaceX Crew-7
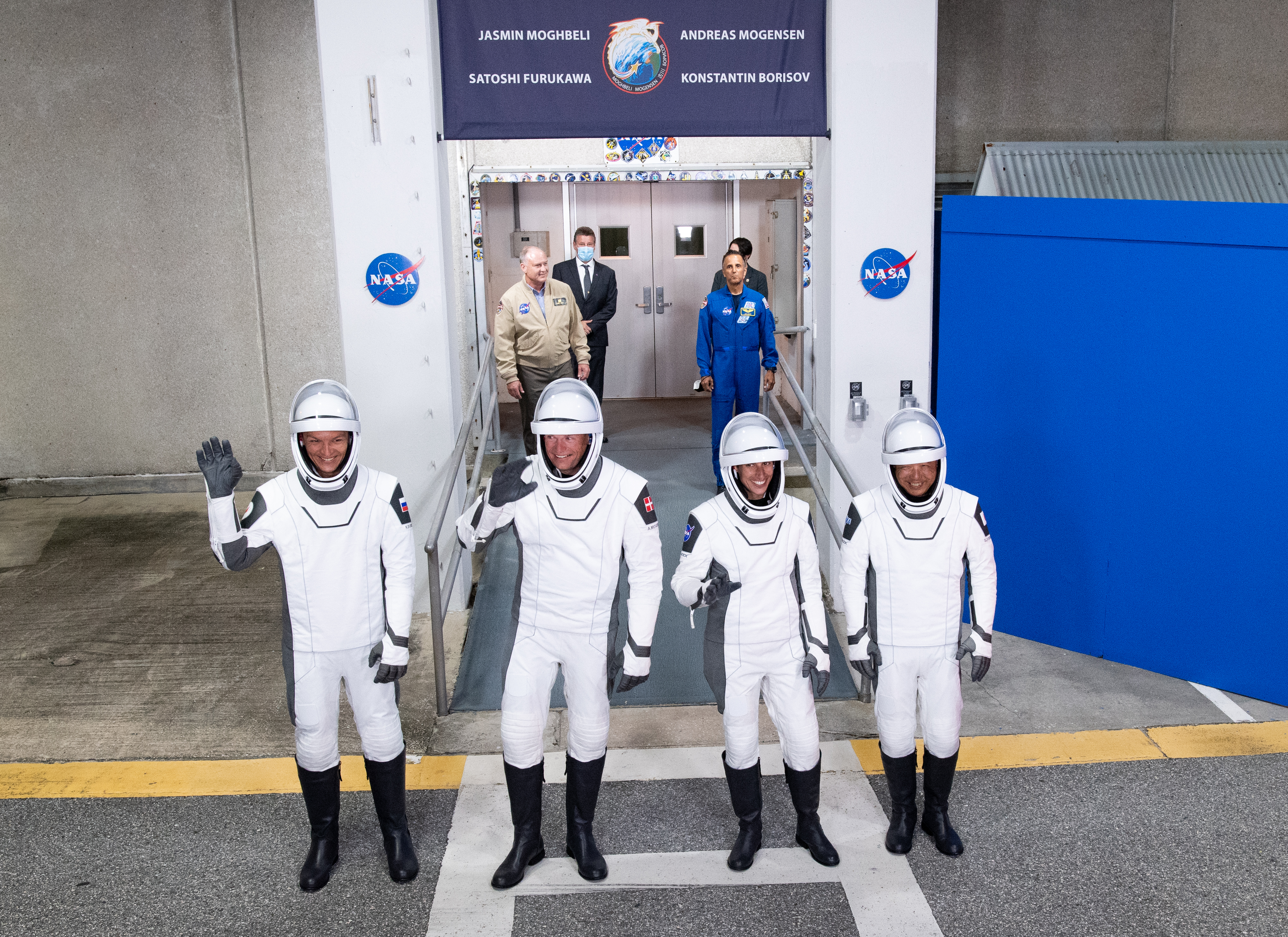
Crew-7 astronauts prior to launch

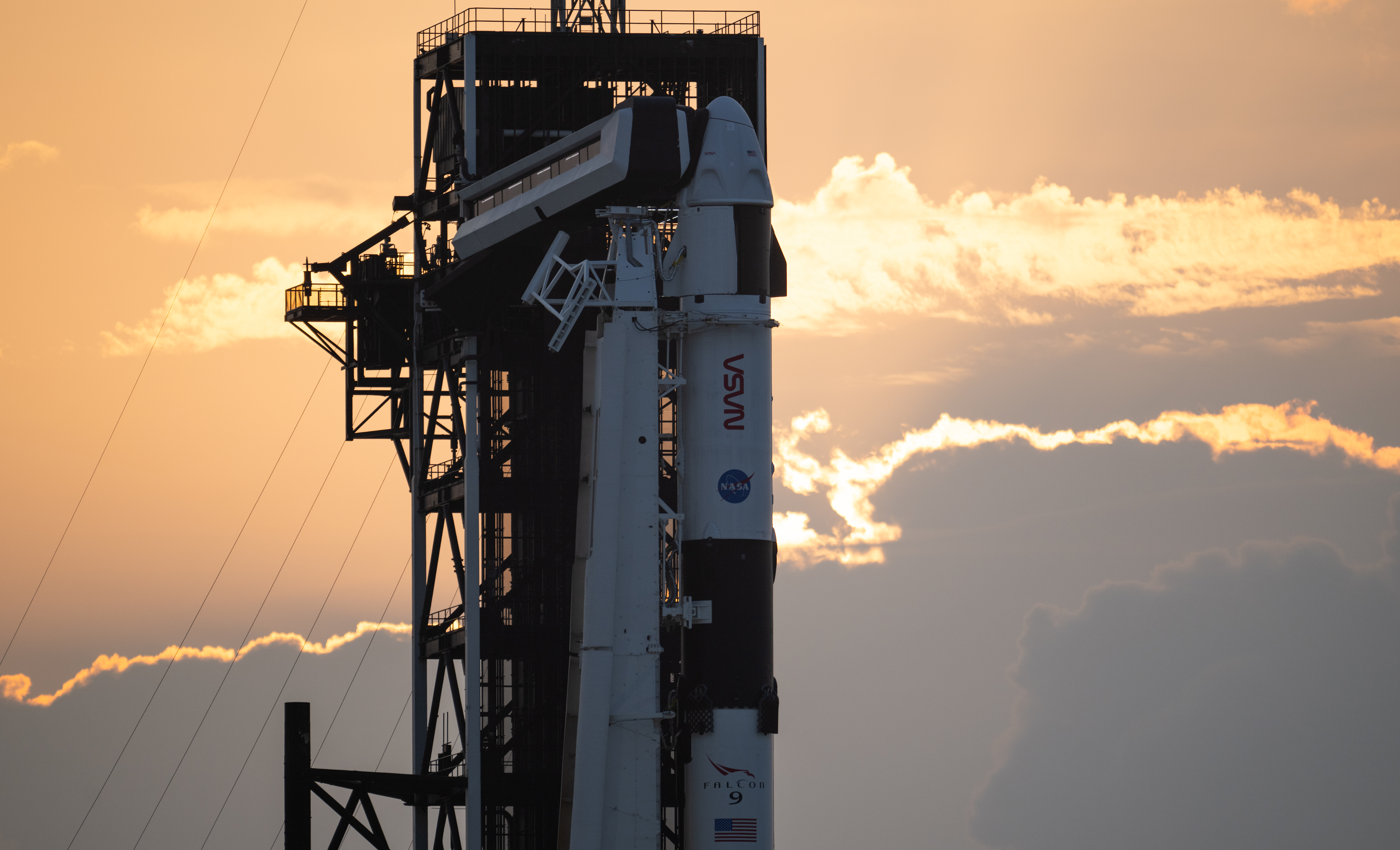
Falcon 9 and Crew Dragon Endurance vertical on Launch Complex 39A in Florida

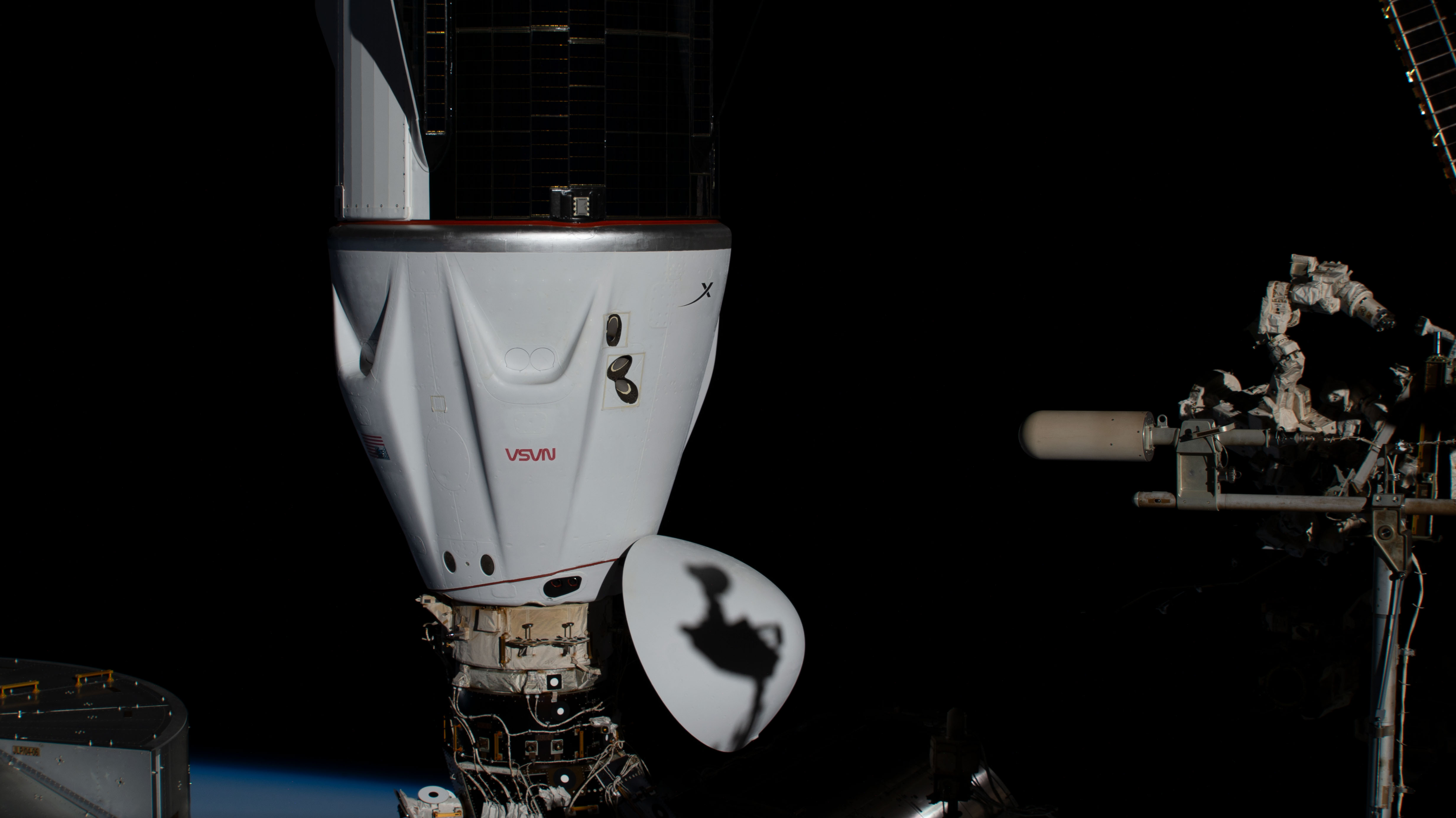
Crew Dragon Endurance docked to the ISS

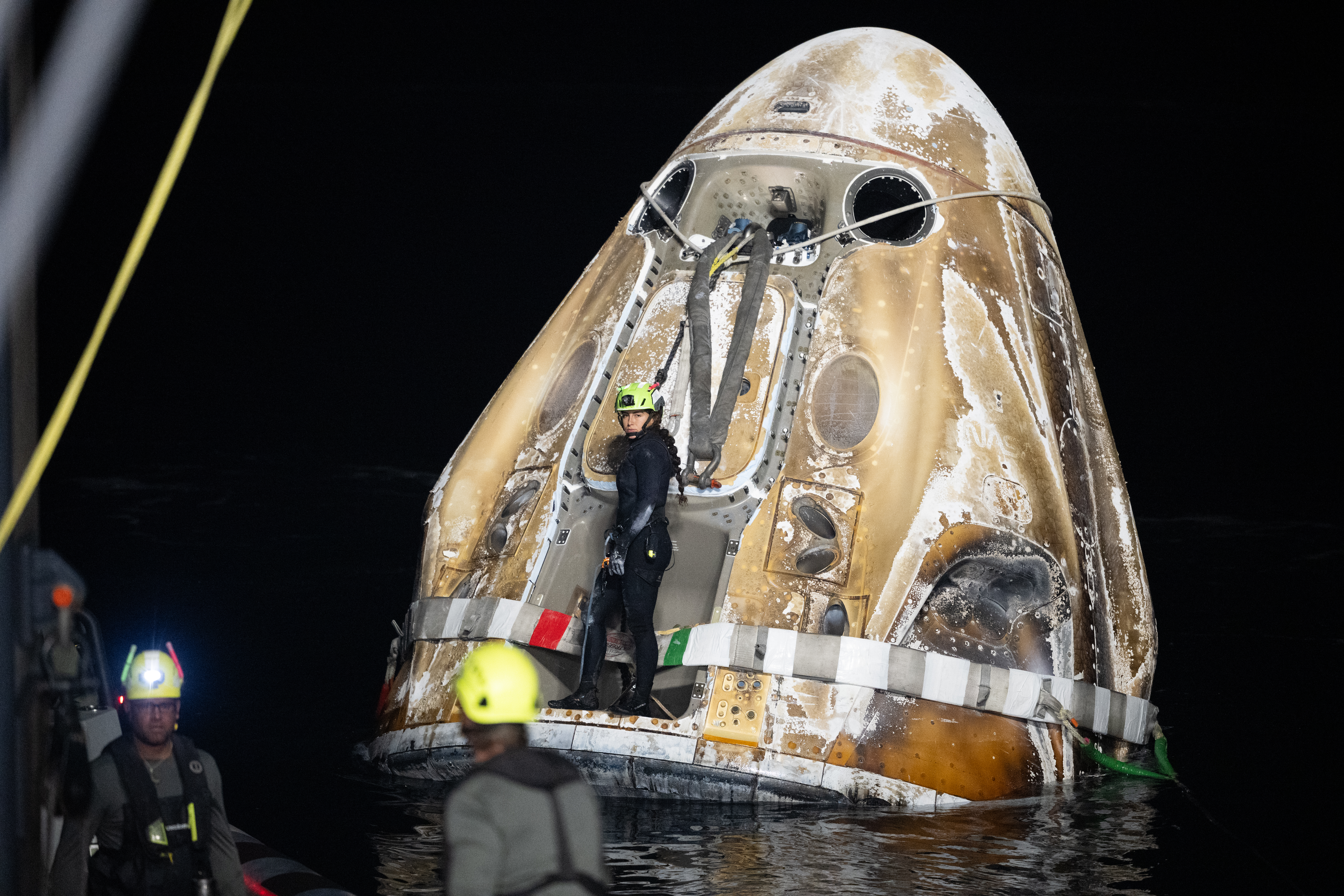
Crew Dragon Endurance after splashdown in the Gulf of Mexico
