= Paul Tipton (physicist) =

American experimental particle physicist

Paul L. Tipton
- Citizenship: United States
- Education: Binghamton University (B.S.); University of Rochester (Ph.D., 1987)
- Known for: Top quark discovery (CDF); ATLAS experiment; Higgs boson research
- Awards: American Physical Society Fellow; NSF Young Investigator Award (1992–1997); DOE Outstanding Junior Investigator Award (1991–1996)
- Scientific career
- Fields: Experimental particle physics
- Workplaces: Yale University; University of Rochester; Fermi National Accelerator Laboratory; Lawrence Berkeley National Laboratory
- Thesis: Lepton-Kaon correlations in B-meson decay (1987)
- Doctoral advisor: Edward H. Thorndike
- Doctoral students: Josh A. Cassada
- Website: physics.yale.edu/people/paul-l-tipton

Paul Louis Tipton is an American experimental particle physicist and the Eugene Higgins Professor of Physics at Yale University. He is known for his contributions to the discovery of the top quark as a member of the CDF experiment at Fermilab, and for his research on the Higgs boson and searches for physics beyond the Standard Model as a member of the ATLAS experiment at CERN.

== Education and early career ==
Tipton received his Bachelor of Science degree in physics from Binghamton University (SUNY Binghamton) and his Ph.D. in physics from the University of Rochester in 1987, under the supervision of Edward H. Thorndike. His doctoral dissertation was titled "Lepton-Kaon correlations in B-meson decay."

After completing his doctorate, Tipton held a postdoctoral fellowship at Lawrence Berkeley National Laboratory, followed by an appointment as the Robert R. Wilson Fellow at Fermi National Accelerator Laboratory.

== Academic career ==
Tipton joined the faculty of the University of Rochester as an assistant professor and rose through the ranks to full professor. He joined the Yale University Department of Physics in 2006. At Yale, he served as Director of Graduate Studies from 2010 to 2013 and as Chair of the Department of Physics from 2013 to 2019. In 2023, he was appointed the Eugene Higgins Professor of Physics.

Tipton serves on the faculty advisory board of the Yale Prison Education Initiative (YPEI), through which he has taught "Concepts of Modern Physics" to incarcerated students.

== Research ==
=== Top quark discovery ===
As a member of the Collider Detector at Fermilab (CDF) collaboration, Tipton made contributions to the discovery of the top quark, announced in 1995. He led the construction and data analysis of an upgraded silicon vertex detector for CDF, which was critical to identifying the short-lived decay products of the top quark. The CDF collaboration published initial evidence for top quark production in 1994 and the observation paper in 1995.

Tipton subsequently served as co-convener of the CDF Top and B Quark Physics Group, and co-authored a review article on the top quark discovery published in Scientific American in 1997. His group's subsequent work at CDF included measurements of the top quark mass, searches for flavor-changing neutral current decays, searches for a charged Higgs boson in top decays, the first evidence for photon production in association with top quarks, and contributions to Higgs boson searches at the Tevatron.

=== ATLAS experiment ===
Tipton's research group is a member of the ATLAS experiment at the Large Hadron Collider (LHC) at CERN. The group has contributed to results including measurements of Higgs boson properties using the diphoton (H→γγ) decay channel, the first search for di-Higgs production, contributions to establishing evidence for Higgs boson production in association with top quark pairs (ttH), and measurements of the CP properties of the Higgs coupling to tau leptons, in collaboration with the group of Sarah Demers.

At Yale's Wright Laboratory, Tipton's group has led the fabrication of stave core support structures for the ATLAS Inner Tracker (ITk) upgrade, which is part of the detector upgrades required for the High-Luminosity Large Hadron Collider (HL-LHC). The stave cores are fabricated using advanced composite materials including carbon foam and support 28 silicon-strip particle detectors each.

== Service to the profession ==
Tipton has served as a member of the Fermilab Physics Advisory Committee and on the Editorial and Planning Committee of the journal Annual Review of Nuclear and Particle Science.

== Awards and honors ==
- American Physical Society Fellow
- National Science Foundation Young Investigator Award (1992–1997)
- U.S. Department of Energy Outstanding Junior Investigator Award (1991–1996)
- University of Rochester Department of Physics and Astronomy Annual Award for Excellence in Teaching (1995)

== Selected publications ==
- Abe, F.; et al. (CDF Collaboration) (1995). "Observation of Top Quark Production in p̄p Collisions with the Collider Detector at Fermilab". Physical Review Letters. 74 (14): 2626. arXiv:hep-ex/9503002. doi:10.1103/PhysRevLett.74.2626.
- Liss, T.; Tipton, P. (September 1997). "The Discovery of the Top Quark". Scientific American: 54–59.
- "Measurements of Higgs boson properties in the diphoton decay channel with 36 fb⁻¹ of pp collision data at √s = 13 TeV with the ATLAS detector". Physical Review D. 98 052005. 2018. arXiv:1802.04146. doi:10.1103/PhysRevD.98.052005. hdl:11390/1203434.
- "Combination of searches for Higgs boson pairs in pp collisions at √s = 13 TeV with the ATLAS detector". Physics Letters B. 800 135103. 2020. arXiv:1906.02025. doi:10.1016/j.physletb.2019.135103. hdl:1822/69396.
