= Paul Tipton (cricketer) =

English cricketer (born 1954)

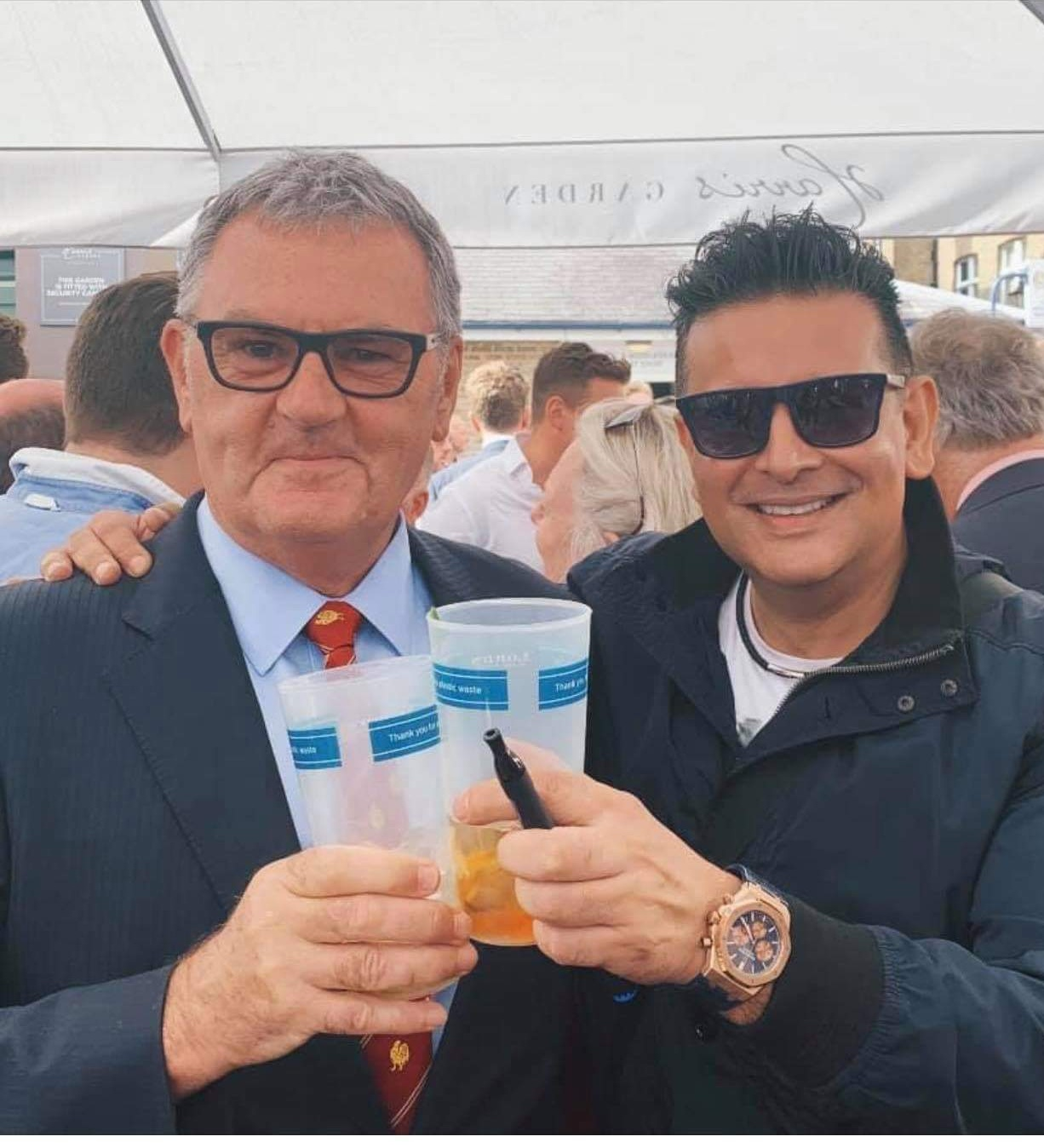
- Tipton (left) in 2019 with TV's Sunny Luthra

Personal information
- Full name: Paul Anthony Tipton
- Born: 26 May 1954 (age 72); Manchester, Lancashire, England
- Batting: Right-handed
- Bowling: Right-arm off break

Domestic team information
- Years: Team
- 1980–1983: Cheshire

Career statistics
| Competition | List A |
|---|---|
| Matches | 2 |
| Runs scored | 7 |
| Batting average | 3.50 |
| 100s/50s | 0/0 |
| Top score | 5 |
| Catches/stumpings | 2/– |
- Source: Cricinfo, 26 January 2020

Paul Anthony Tipton (born 26 May 1954) is an English dentist and cricketer.

== Biography ==
Tipton was born at Manchester, on 26 May 1954. After playing second XI cricket for Lancashire from 1971 to 1978, he debuted in minor counties cricket for Cheshire against Durham in the 1980 Minor Counties Championship. He played minor counties cricket for Cheshire until 1983, making 24 appearances in the Minor Counties Championship and four appearances in the MCCA Knockout Trophy. In addition to playing minor counties cricket for Cheshire, Tipton also appeared in two List A one-day matches for the county, playing against first-class opponents in the form of Middlesex in the 1982 NatWest Trophy, and Kent in the 1983 NatWest Trophy.
