= Kirill Peskov =

Russian cosmonaut (born 1990)

- Кирилл Песков
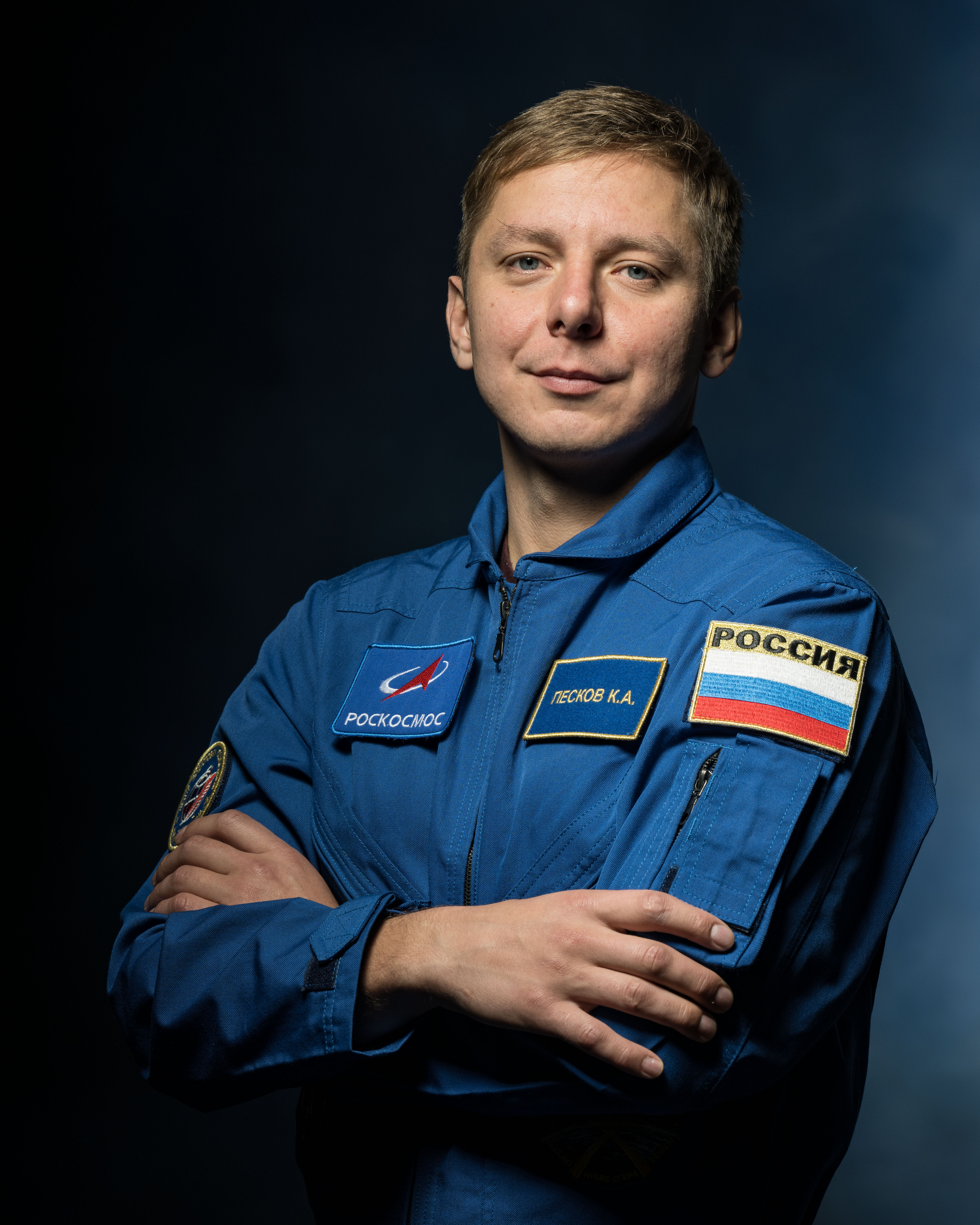
- Peskov in 2024
- Born: Kirill Alexandrovich Peskov; 1 May 1990 (age 36); Kyzyl, Tuva ASSR, Soviet Union
- Education: Ulyanovsk Institute of Civil Aviation
- Space career

Roscosmos cosmonaut
- Current occupation: Test cosmonaut
- Previous occupation: First officer for Ikar and Nordwind Airlines
- Status: Active
- Rank: Lieutenant, Russian Air Force (reserve)
- Time in space: 147 days, 16 hours, 29 minutes
- Selection: 17th Cosmonaut Group (2018)
- Missions: SpaceX Crew-10 (Expedition 72/73)
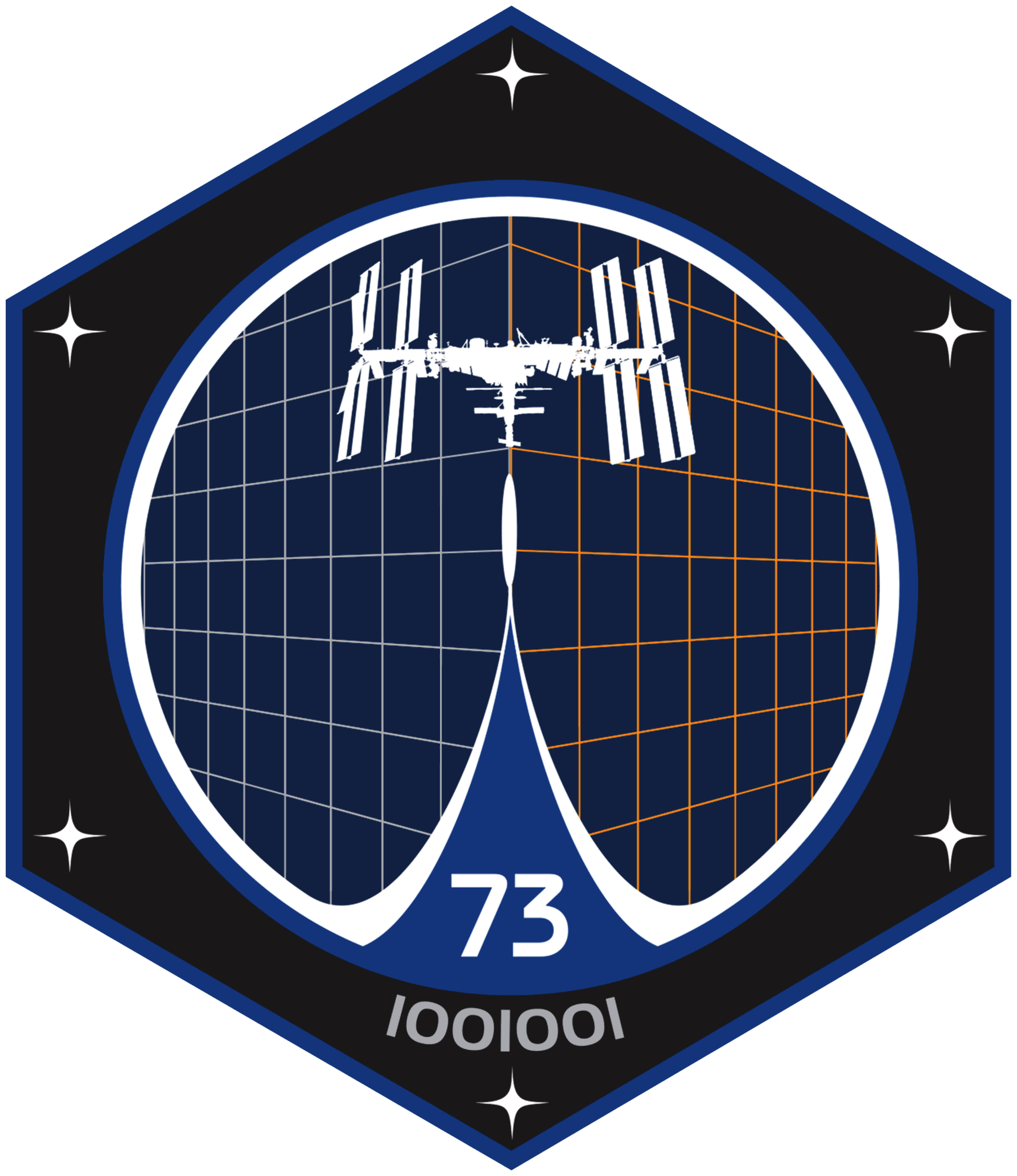
- Mission insignia

Signature
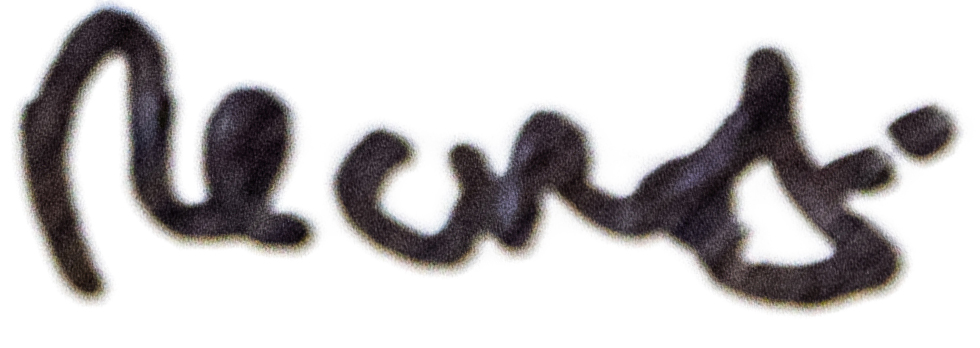

Kirill Alexandrovich Peskov (Russian: Кирилл Александрович Песков; born 1 May 1990) is a Russian cosmonaut who served as a flight engineer as part of the long-duration Expedition 72 and 73 missions to the International Space Station flying aboard SpaceX Crew-10. Selected as a cosmonaut in 2018 as part of Roscosmos Group 17, he has undergone extensive training at the Yuri Gagarin Cosmonaut Training Center. Before joining the cosmonaut corps, he was a commercial pilot, serving as a first officer for Ikar Airlines on Boeing 757 and 767 aircraft.

== Early life, education and career ==
Born in Kyzyl, in what was then known as the Tuva Autonomous Soviet Socialist Republic, Peskov graduated from School No. 14 in Nazarovo in 2007. He then enrolled at the Ulyanovsk Institute of Civil Aviation, specializing in Flight Operation of Aircraft. In 2012, he earned an engineering degree in Flight Operations of Aircraft from the Ulyanovsk Institute of Civil Aviation and received the military rank of Lieutenant in the reserve forces of the Russian Air Force.

Peskov began his professional aviation career in 2012 as a first officer with Nordwind Airlines, piloting Boeing 757 aircraft based out of Sheremetyevo Airport. The following year, he joined Ikar Airlines, flying Boeing 757 and 767 aircraft based out of Krasnoyarsk International Airport until his selection as a cosmonaut candidate in 2018.

== Cosmonaut selection and training ==
In March 2017, Peskov applied to the Yuri Gagarin Cosmonaut Training Center's recruitment program. After receiving clearance from the medical commission in April 2018, he was officially selected as a cosmonaut candidate in August.

In early 2019, Peskov participated in winter survival training, simulating emergency landings in forested and marshy areas alongside his fellow cosmonaut candidates. Later that year, he completed diver training at the Noginsk rescue center, earning his qualification as a diver. In October, he underwent intensive water survival training in the Black Sea, where he practiced dry, long, and short-duration survival exercises.

Peskov successfully passed the state examination in November 2020. A few weeks later, in December, he was officially certified as a test cosmonaut by the Interdepartmental Qualification Commission. The following year, in July 2021, he participated in a two-day desert survival exercise, preparing for potential spacecraft landings in harsh, arid environments.

== Roscosmos career ==
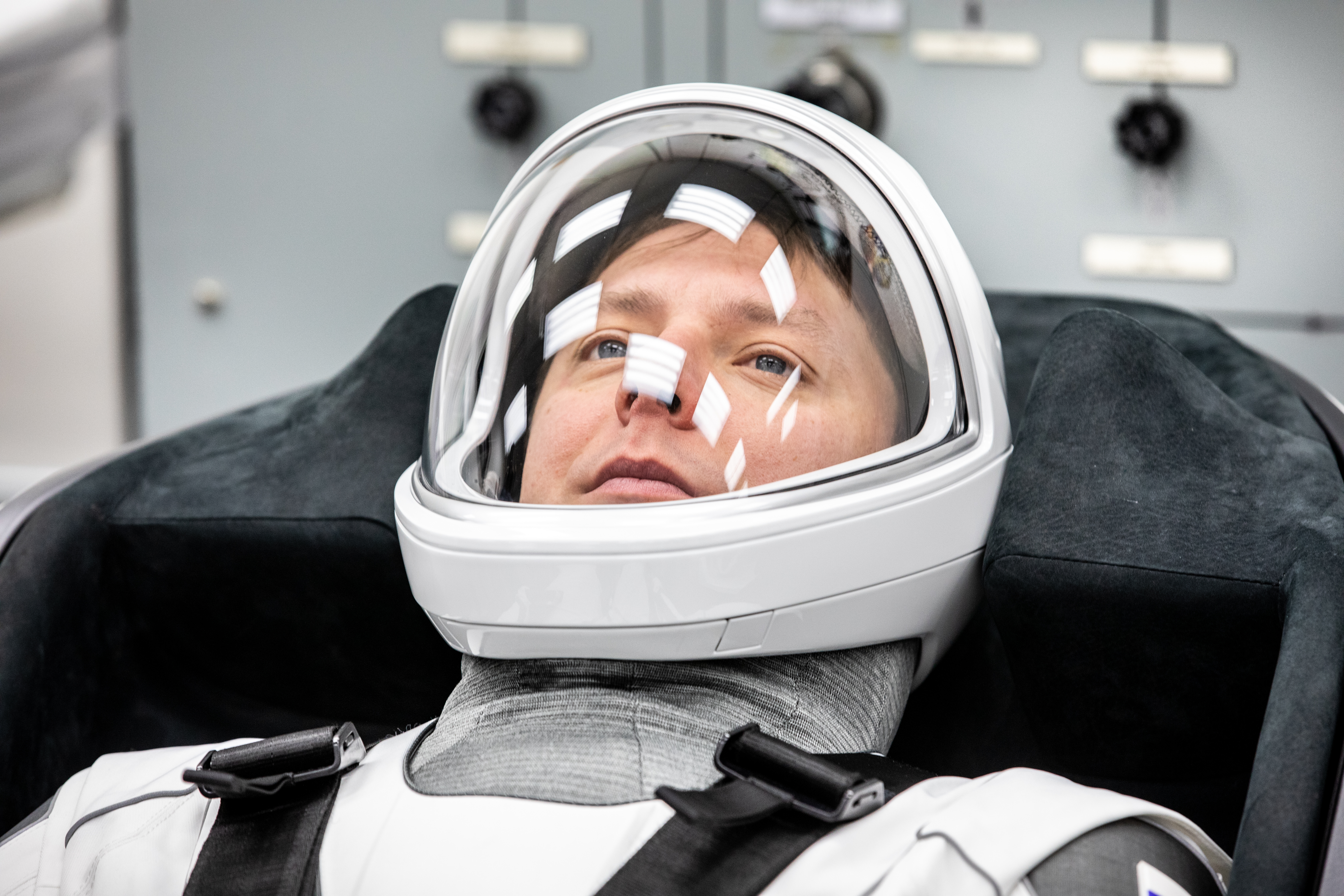
Peskov suited up before Crew-10 in the Operations and Checkout Building

In May 2023, Peskov was assigned as the backup for Aleksandr Gorbunov on SpaceX Crew-9, part of a crew swap agreement between Roscosmos and NASA to maintain a continuous presence on the International Space Station (ISS). At the same time, he was training as a flight engineer for the Soyuz MS-27 spacecraft, which was slated to carry cosmonauts to the ISS for Expedition 73.

His first spaceflight assignment came in August 2024 when he was selected as a crew member for SpaceX Crew-10, which transported him to the ISS for Expedition 72/73 in March 2025.
