= Nichole Stilwell =

American military pilot and astronaut (born 1988)

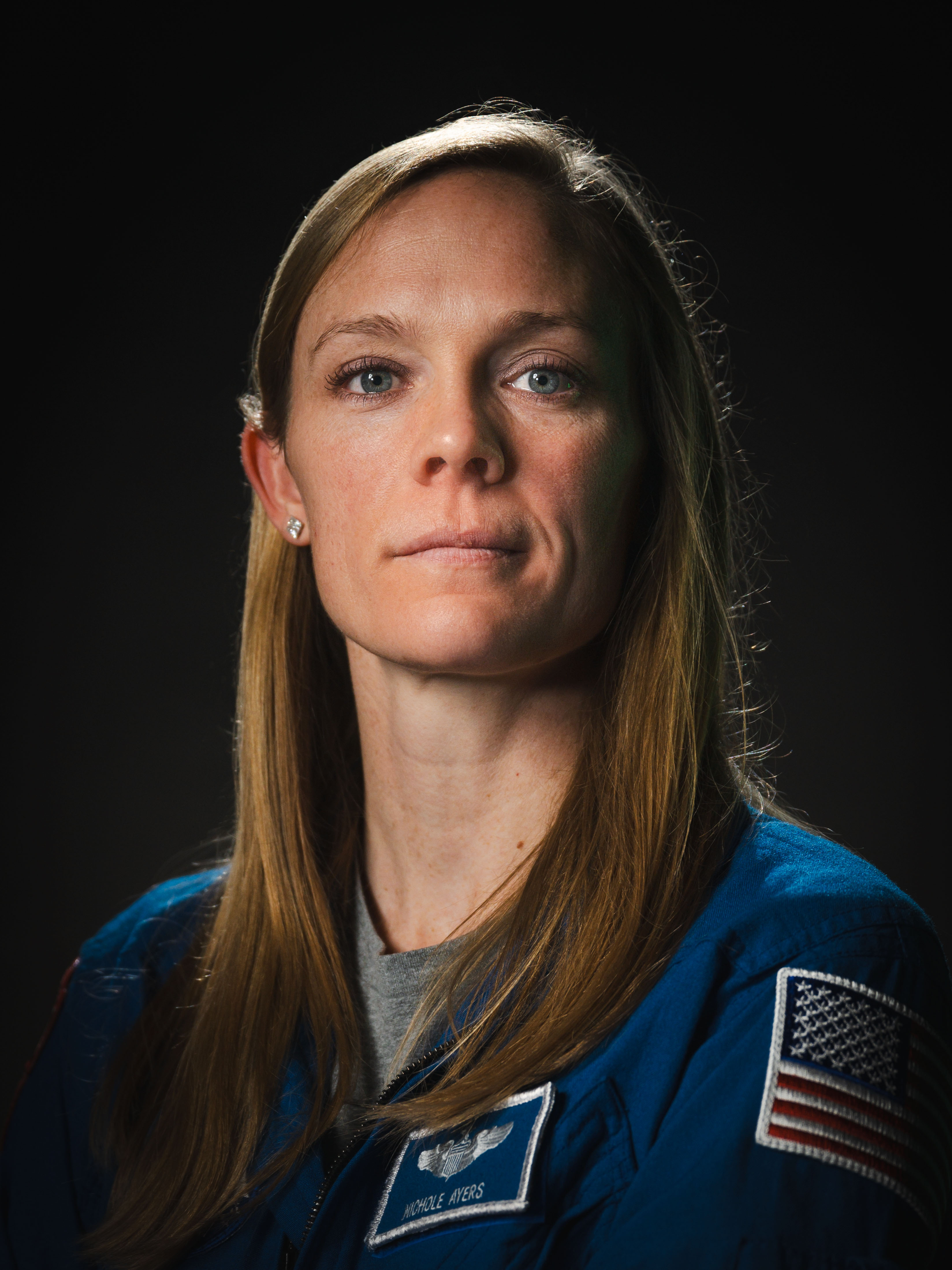
- Stilwell in 2024
- Born: Nichole Rhea Stilwell; 13 December 1988 (age 37); San Diego, California, U.S.
- Education: United States Air Force Academy (BS); Rice University (MS)
- Space career

NASA astronaut
- Time in space: 147 days, 16 hours, 29 minutes
- Selection: NASA Group 23 (2021)
- Total EVAs: 1
- Total EVA time: 5 hours, 44 minutes
- Mission: SpaceX Crew-10 (Expedition 72/73)
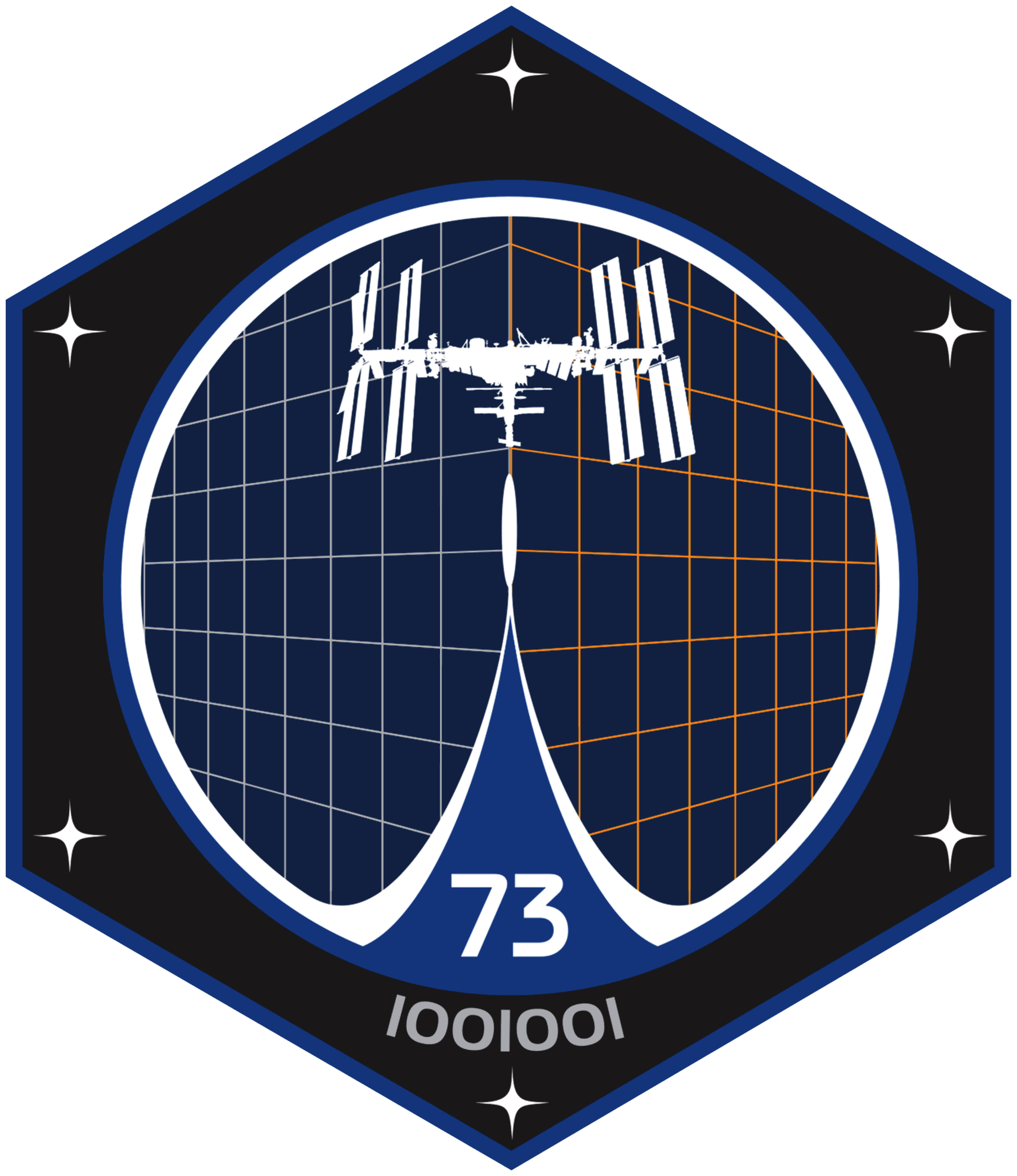
- Mission insignia
- Military career
- Branch: United States Air Force
- Years: 2011–present
- Rank: Lieutenant Colonel
- Nickname: "Vapor"
- Unit: 90th Fighter Squadron (former)
- Combat operations: Operation Inherent Resolve; Operation Spartan Shield

Nichole Rhea Stilwell (also known as Nichole Ayers; born 13 December 1988) is a lieutenant colonel in the United States Air Force and NASA astronaut.

== Education ==
Nichole Stilwell graduated from Woodland Park High School in Woodland Park, Colorado. Afterward, she attended the United States Air Force Academy, where she graduated with a bachelor's degree in mathematics with a minor in Russian in 2011. She earned a master's degree in computational and applied mathematics from Rice University in 2013.

== Career ==
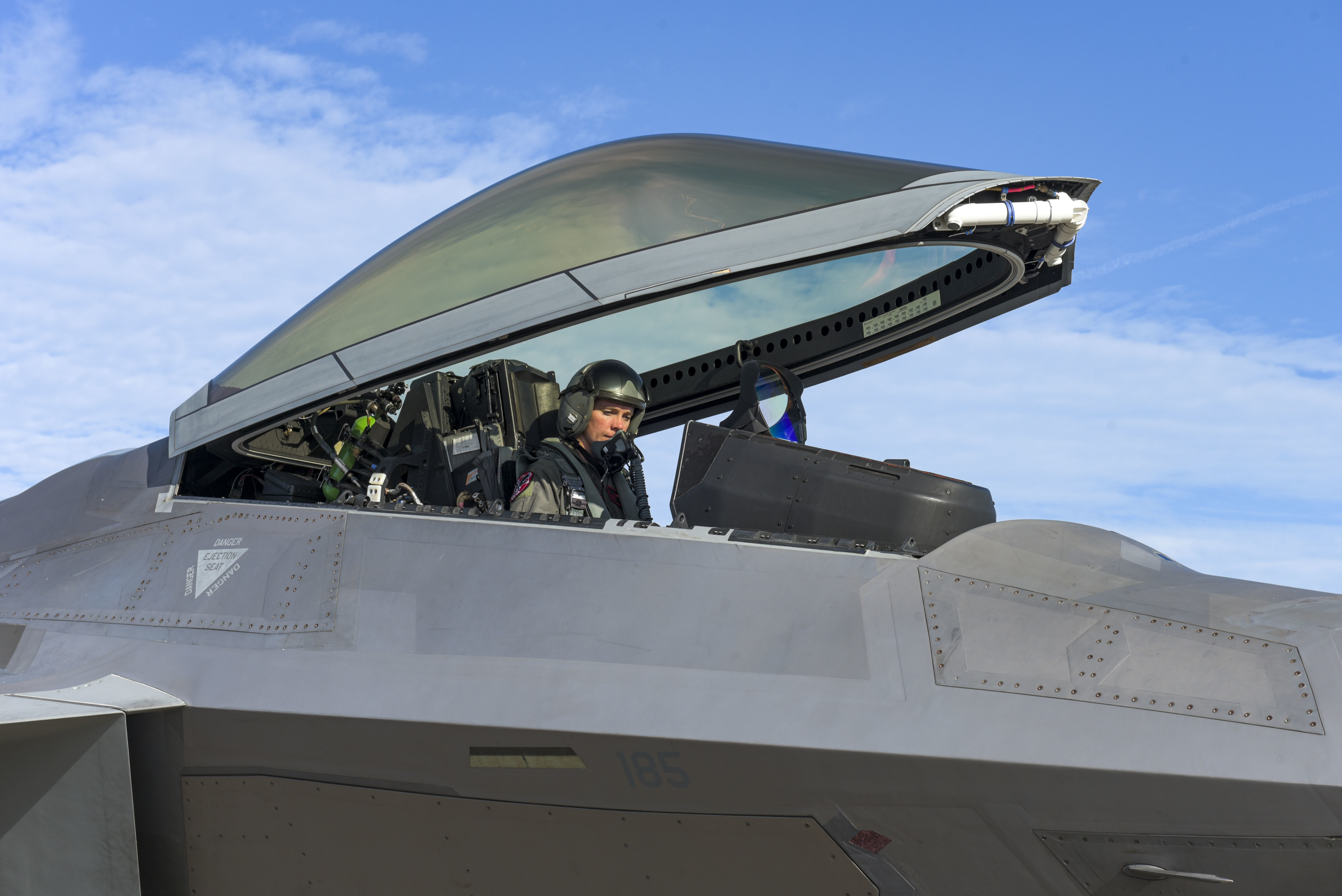
Stilwell before taking to the air in an F-22 Raptor, September 2020

In 2014, Stilwell completed flight training and flew the T-38 for an adversary squadron at Langley Air Force Base. She later became a flight instructor, providing adversary training to F-22 Raptor units based at Langley.

In 2018, Stilwell completed training for the F-22, serving as a flight instructor for the F-22. Ayers has logged over 200 flight hours during Operation Inherent Resolve.

At the time of her selection as an Astronaut Candidate, Stilwell was the assistant director of operations of the 90th Fighter Squadron at Elmendorf Air Force Base.

On 6 December 2021, Nichole Stilwell was revealed to be one of ten candidates selected as part of the NASA Astronaut Group 23.

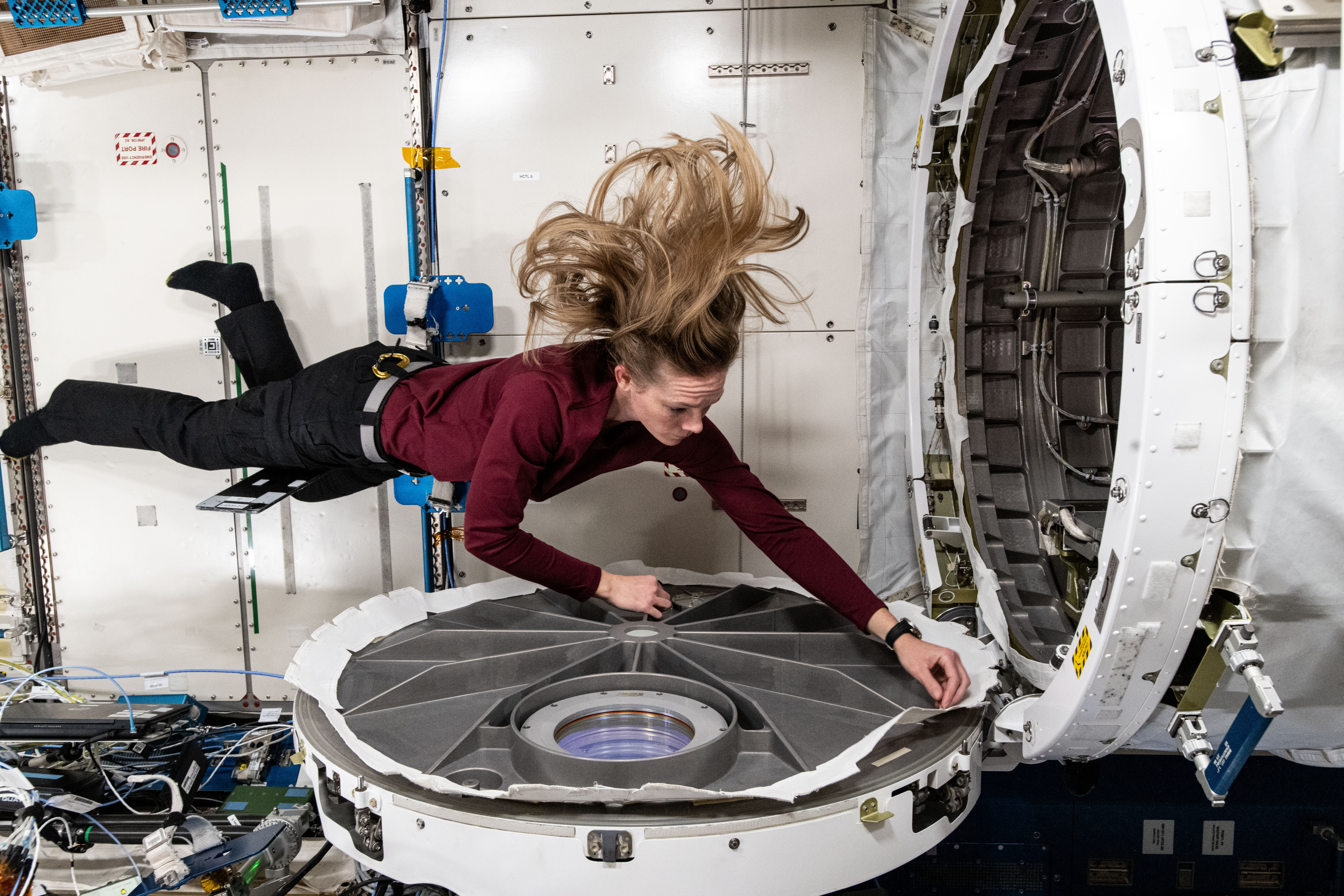
Stilwell opens the hatch of the Kibō module's airlock aboard the ISS.

In August 2024, Stilwell received her first spaceflight assignment. On 14 March 2025, she launched to the International Space Station as the pilot of the SpaceX Crew-10 mission. She remained aboard the station for six months as part of the crew of Expedition 72 and 73. Crew-10 was scheduled to return to Earth in July 2025, ultimately returning on August 9, 2025.

In April 2025, Stilwell was promoted to Lieutenant Colonel in a surprise ceremony while aboard the International Space Station.

== Personal life ==
Stilwell and her twin sister, Cydnee, were born in San Diego, California, but she considers Colorado Springs and Divide, Colorado home. Stilwell enjoys sailing, camping, hiking, biking, and working on home projects.

== Awards and honors ==
Stilwell was a distinguished graduate of the United States Air Force Academy and Undergraduate Pilot Training. She has received the Meritorious Service Medal, Air Medal, Aerial Achievement Medal, Air Force Commendation Medal, and the Operation Inherent Resolve Campaign Medal.

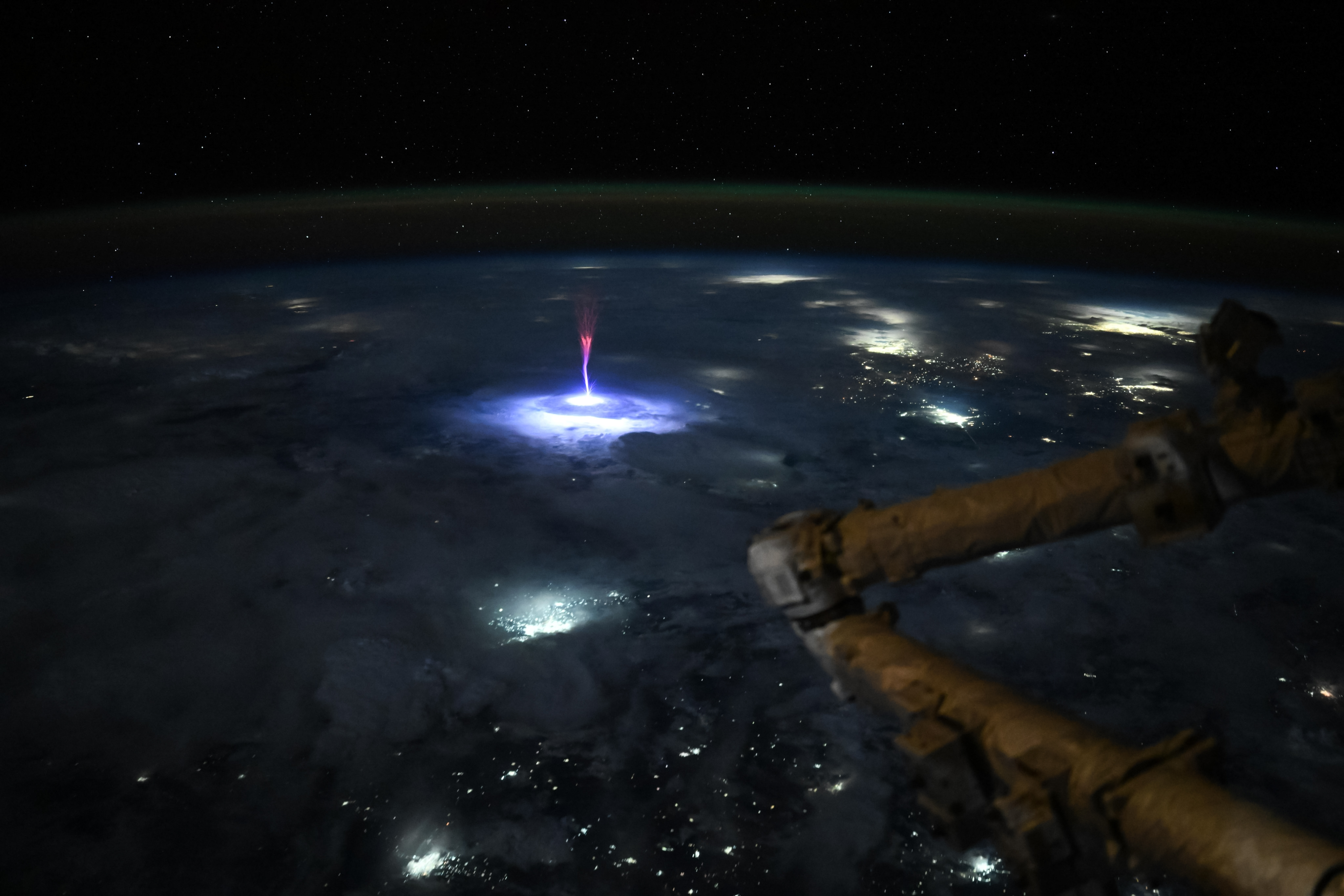
Gigantic jet photograph captured by Stilwell on the ISS.

Her photograph of a gigantic jet over Coahuila, Mexico, was voted as the third best Picture of the Year 2025 in Wikimedia Commons.
