= Jasmin Moghbeli =

NASA astronaut and US Marine Corps officer and test pilot (born 1983)

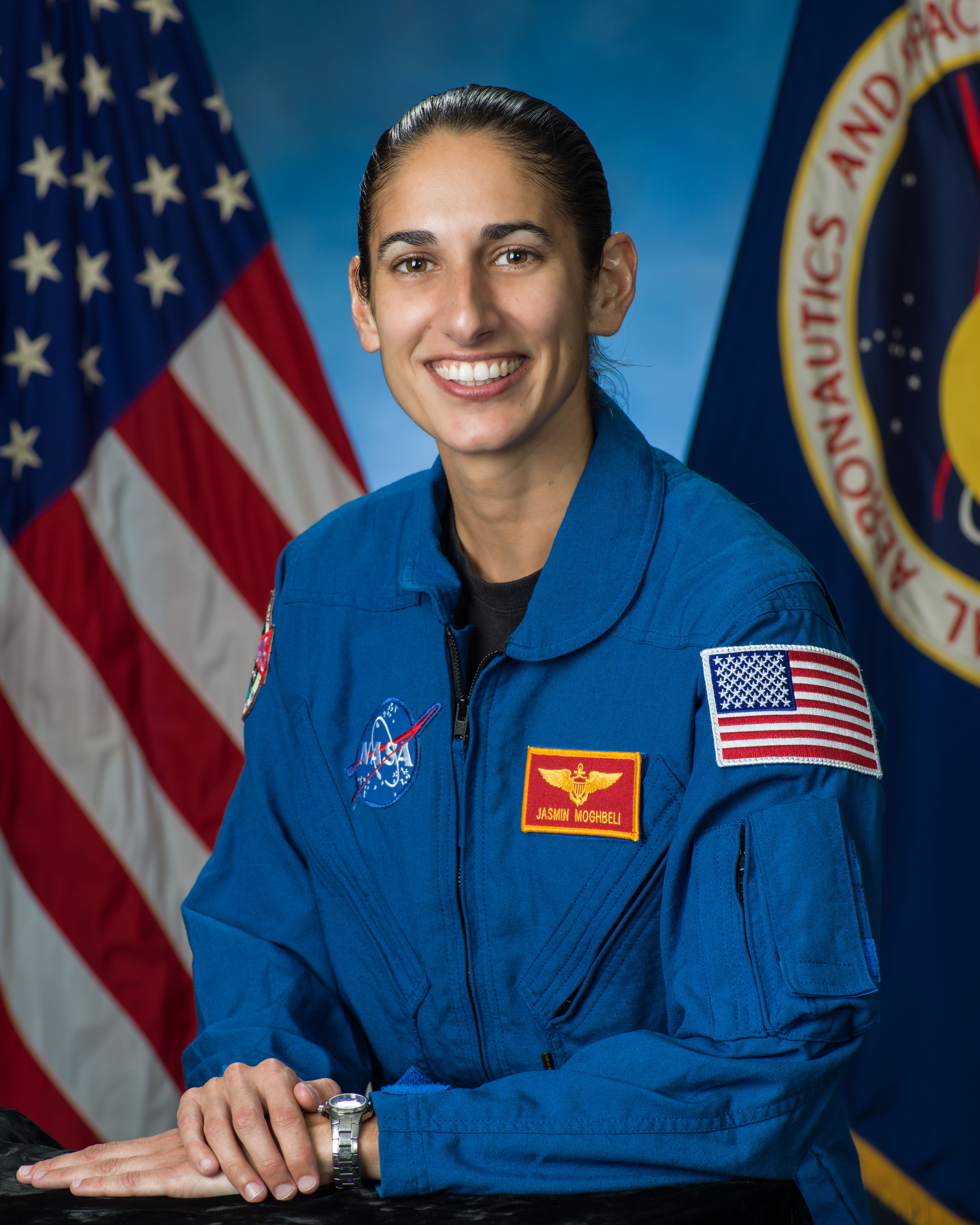
- Official portrait, 2017
- Born: June 24, 1983 (age 43); Bad Nauheim, West Germany
- Education: Massachusetts Institute of Technology (BS); Naval Postgraduate School (MS)
- Spouse: Sam Wald
- Children: 2
- Space career

NASA astronaut
- Rank: Lieutenant Colonel, USMC
- Time in space: 199 days, 2 hours and 20 minutes
- Selection: NASA Group 22 (2017)
- Total EVAs: 1
- Total EVA time: 6h 42m
- Missions: SpaceX Crew-7 (Expedition 69/70)

NASA interviews with Jasmin Moghbeli

Jasmin Moghbeli (born June 24, 1983) is an American U.S. Marine Corps test pilot and NASA astronaut. She is a graduate of the Massachusetts Institute of Technology, Naval Postgraduate School, and Naval Test Pilot School. Moghbeli was a mission commander for SpaceX Crew-7 and a flight engineer aboard the International Space Station for Expedition 69/70.

== Early life and education ==
Jasmin Moghbeli was born in Bad Nauheim, West Germany on June 24, 1983.

Her father, Kamran (Kamy) Moghbeli, was an architect who immigrated to Germany in 1980 from Tehran, Iran. He and his family lived in Bad Nauheim, where Jasmin was born, until the beginning of 1984 when they immigrated to the United States. Her mother is Fereshta (Fery) Moghbeli. Moghbeli has an older brother, Kaveh, specialist in pulmonary and intensive care medicine. Moghbeli speaks Persian, English, and learned Russian during her astronaut training.

Moghbeli attended Baldwin Senior High School in New York. She earned a bachelor's degree in aerospace engineering with information technology at the Massachusetts Institute of Technology (MIT), and played volleyball, lacrosse, and basketball for the MIT Engineers.

== Military career ==
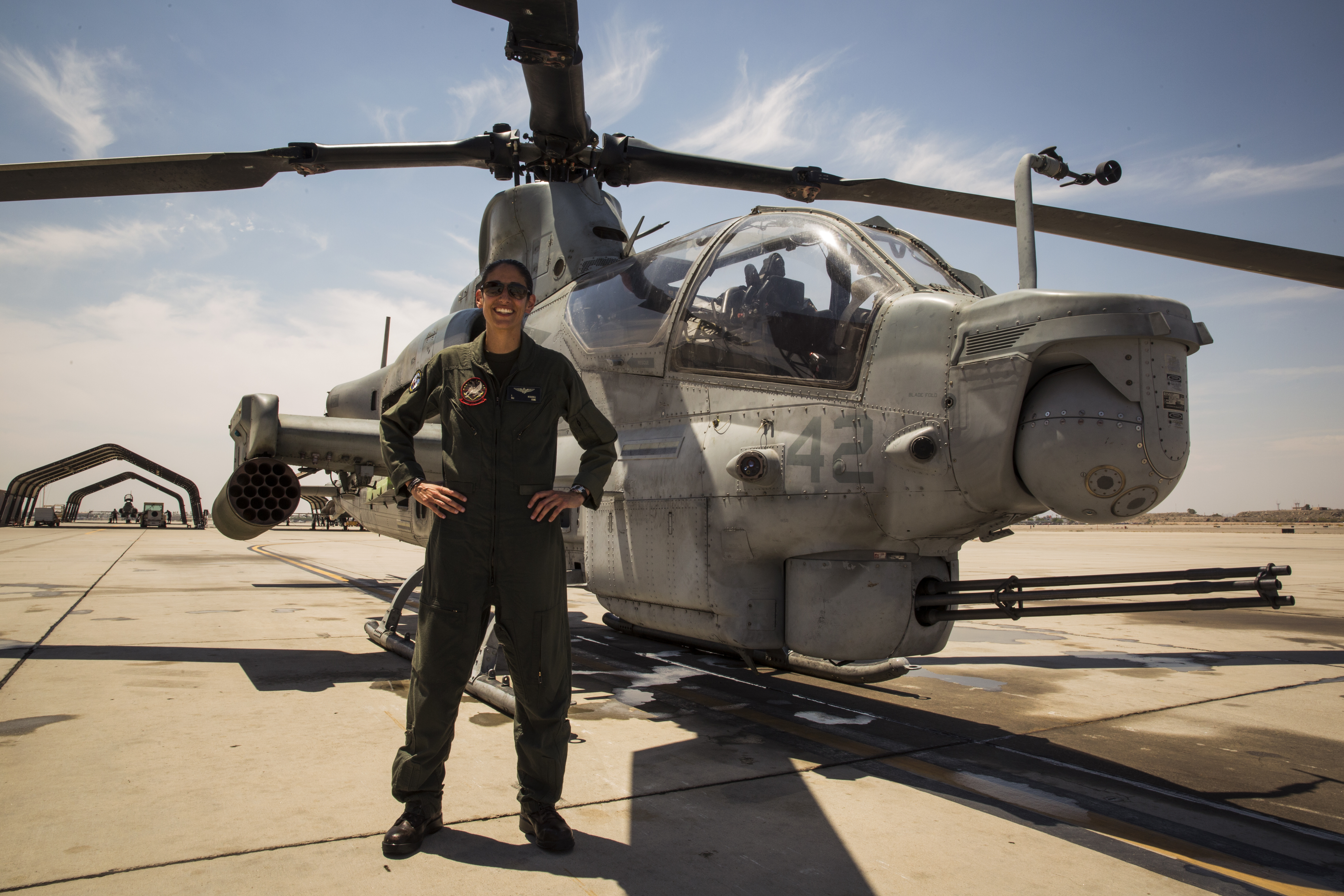
Moghbeli pictured with a Bell AH-1Z Viper in 2017

Moghbeli was commissioned as an officer in the United States Marine Corps in 2005, and trained to become an AH-1 Super Cobra pilot. While in service with the Marine Corps, she deployed overseas three times and completed 150 combat missions. Moghbeli received a master's degree in aerospace engineering from the U.S. Naval Postgraduate School in California. She attended the U.S. Naval Test Pilot School at Patuxent River Naval Air Station in Maryland, becoming a helicopter test pilot with VMX-1 at Marine Corps Air Station Yuma in Arizona.

As of 2019, she has accumulated over 2,000 hours of flight time and flown in 150 combat missions, including sorties in Afghanistan.

== NASA career ==
In June 2017, Moghbeli was selected as a member of NASA Astronaut Group 22, and subsequently began her two-year training.

In January 2020, she graduated alongside 13 others in the NASA Astronaut Candidate Training Program, officially making her "eligible for spaceflight, including assignments to the International Space Station, Artemis missions to the Moon, and ultimately, missions to Mars".

In March 2022, she was assigned as commander of the SpaceX Crew-7 mission to the International Space Station. The mission, her first flight in space, launched to the space station on August 26, 2023. On March 12, 2024, the mission landed off the coast of Florida after spending 199 days in space and orbiting Earth 3,184 times.

In September 2025, Moghbeli participated in the ESA CAVES 2025 course held in the Matese mountains in the Italian Apennines.

== Personal life ==
Moghbeli is married to Sam Wald. They are the parents of twin girls. Wald is Jewish, and they celebrate both Christmas and Hanukkah at home; Moghbeli celebrated Hanukkah in space as well.

She is proud of her American and Persian heritage, noting: "Reflecting on this past year, I stand here so proud of my Persian heritage but also incredibly proud to be an American." She still celebrates Nowruz (Persian New Year).

Space exploration was an aspiration for Moghbeli as a child. During school, she wrote a sixth-grade book report on the first woman in space, Soviet cosmonaut Valentina Tereshkova.

== Awards and honors ==
Moghbeli has received four Air Medals, a Navy and Marine Corps Commendation Medal, and three Navy and Marine Corps Achievement Medals. She has also received the U.S. Navy Test Pilot School Class 144 Outstanding Developmental Phase II Award and the Commander Willie McCool Outstanding Student Award as the Class 144 Honor Graduate.
