= Josh A. Cassada =

American physicist and NASA astronaut (born 1973)

Josh Cassada
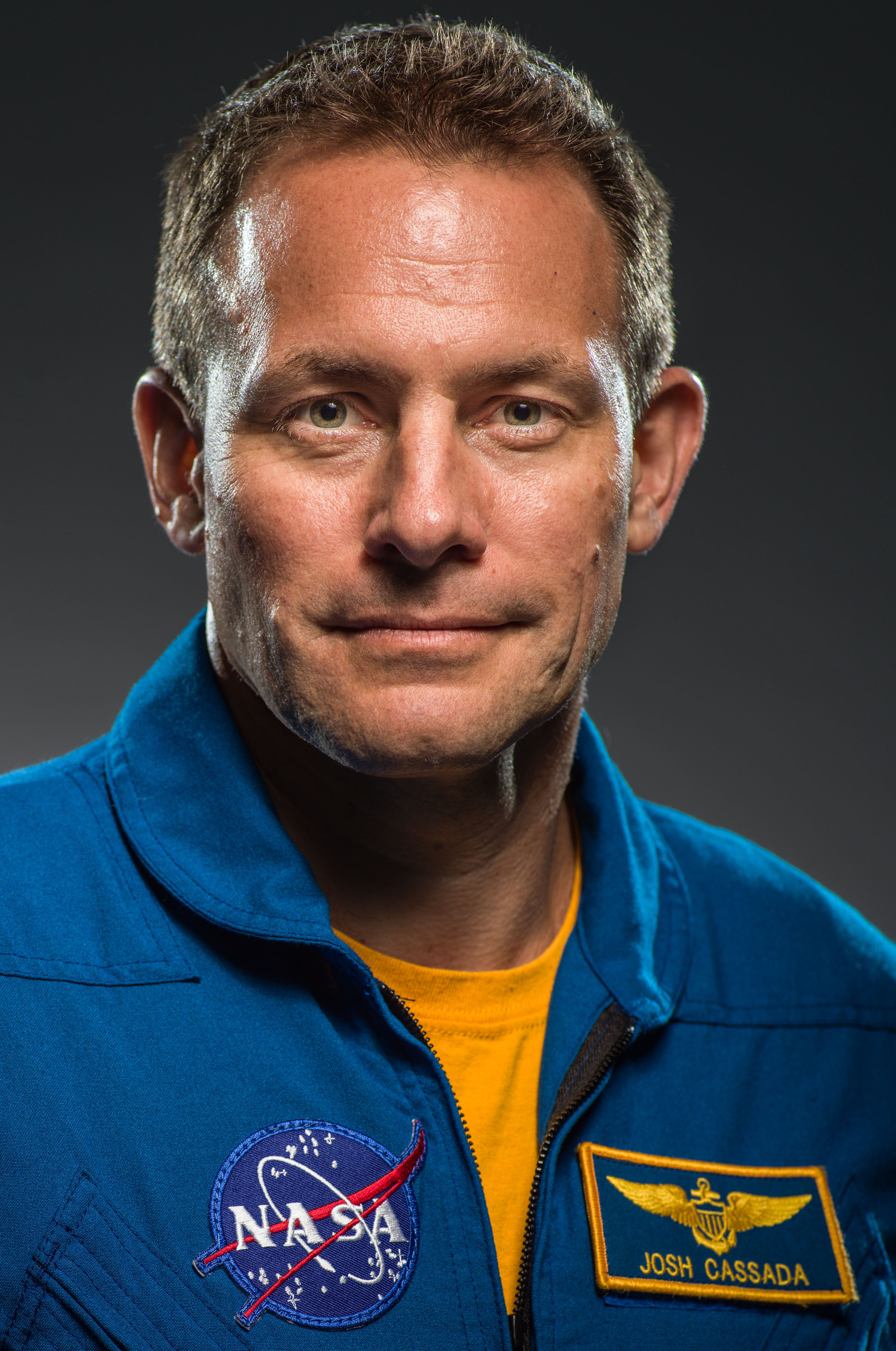
- Born: Josh Aaron Cassada; July 18, 1973 (age 53); San Diego, California, U.S.
- Education: Albion College (BA); University of Rochester (MA, PhD)
- Space career

NASA astronaut
- Rank: Captain, US Navy
- Time in space: 157 days, 10 hours, 1 minute
- Selection: NASA Group 21 (2013)
- Total EVAs: 3
- Total EVA time: 21 hours, 24 minutes
- Missions: SpaceX Crew-5 (Expedition 68)
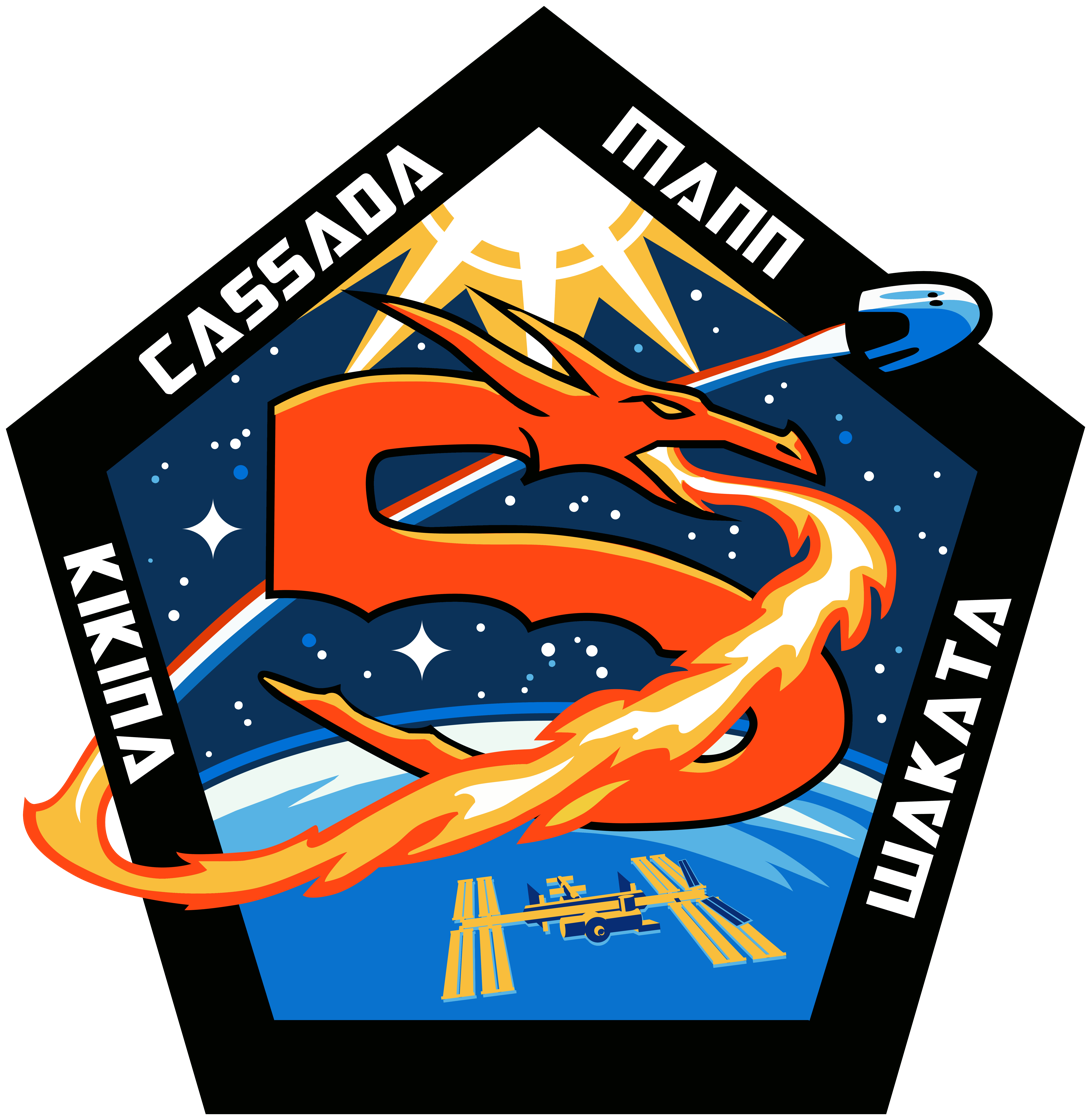
- Mission insignia
- Retired: October 1, 2024
- Scientific career
- Fields: Physics
- Thesis: A Search for New Particles Decaying into tt̄ Pairs (1999)
- Doctoral advisor: Paul Tipton

Josh Aaron Cassada (born July 18, 1973) is an American physicist, test pilot, and former NASA astronaut. Prior to his selection to join NASA in 2013, Cassada served as a test pilot in the US Navy, and has over 3,500 hours in more than 40 aircraft, and 23 combat missions. In August 2018, Cassada was selected for CTS-1, the first operational mission of the Boeing CST-100 Starliner, but subsequently reassigned to SpaceX Crew-5.

== Early life and education ==
Josh Aaron Cassada was born on July 18, 1973, in San Diego, California, and raised in White Bear Lake, Minnesota. Cassada graduated from Albion College in 1995 with a Bachelor of Arts in physics. He was a member of Sigma Chi Alpha Pi Chapter Fraternity at Albion College. He attended the University of Rochester for graduate school and received a Master of Arts and a doctorate in physics in 1997 and 2000, respectively. While at the University of Rochester, Cassada studied high-energy particle physics and conducted research at the Fermi National Accelerator Laboratory.

== Military career ==
After completing his graduate work, Cassada commissioned as a naval officer in 2000. He completed flight training in 2001, and became a P-3 Orion pilot in VP-8 at NAS Brunswick in 2002. Cassada deployed in support of Operation Iraqi Freedom and Operation Enduring Freedom, and flew in the humanitarian Operation Unified Assistance after the 2004 Indian Ocean tsunami. In 2006, he graduated from the U.S. Naval Test Pilot School, and served as a P-3 Orion and P-8 Poseidon test pilot at NAS Patuxent River. Cassada served as the P-8A Airworthiness Project Officer, and was a T-38 Talon and T-6 Texan instructor test pilot. In 2011, he worked for the Defense Contract Management Agency at Boeing in Seattle, Washington, where he oversaw operations and contracts for the P-8 Poseidon, KC-46 Pegasus, E-3 Sentry, and the US Marine Corps UAV programs. Outside of the military, he founded Quantum Opus, a superconducting instrument manufacturer, with two of his classmates from Albion College.

== NASA career ==
In 2013, Cassada was selected for NASA Astronaut Group 21, and completed training in July 2015. He has served as CAPCOM in support of International Space Station operations, and worked on the development of the Orion and Commercial Crew programs. In August 2018, he and Sunita Williams were selected to fly on CTS-1, the first operational flight of Boeing's CST-100 Starliner spacecraft. However, due to delays in Starliner's development, Cassada was reassigned to SpaceX's Crew-5 flight. Cassada retired from NASA on October 1, 2024.

== Personal life ==
Cassada and his wife, Megan, have two children.

== Awards and honors ==
Cassada graduated summa cum laude from Albion College, and received a teaching award from the University of Rochester's physics and astronomy department. In his military career, Cassada was awarded the Defense Meritorious Service Medal, three Navy and Marine Corps Commendation Medals, including the Combat V device, and the Navy and Marine Corps Achievement Medal.
