= List of astronauts educated at the United States Naval Academy =

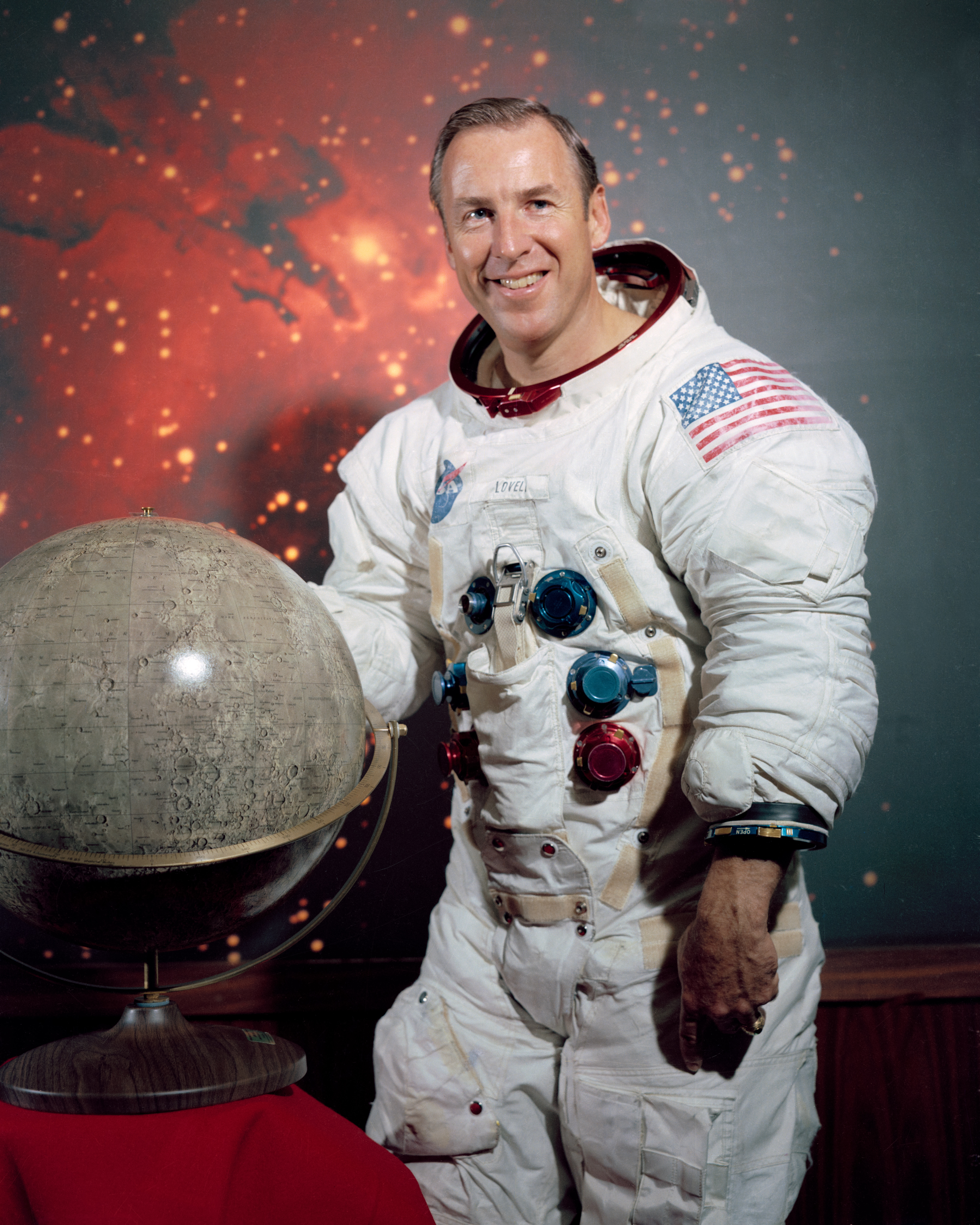
James A. Lovell

As of 2023, fifty-four United States astronauts have graduated from the United States Naval Academy (USNA), more than from any other undergraduate institution. The Naval Academy is an undergraduate college in Annapolis, Maryland, with the mission of educating and commissioning officers for the United States Navy and Marine Corps. During the latter half of the 19th century and the first decades of the 20th, the United States Naval Academy was the primary source of U.S. Navy and Marine Corps officers, with the class of 1881 being the first to provide officers to the Marine Corps. Graduates of the Academy are also given the option of entering the United States Army or United States Air Force; known as cross-commissioning. Most Midshipmen are admitted through the congressional appointment system. The curriculum emphasizes various fields of engineering. Graduates who enter aviation and space-related fields have the opportunity to be selected for astronaut training by the National Aeronautics and Space Administration (NASA).

This list is drawn from graduates of the Naval Academy who became astronauts. The Academy was founded in 1845 and graduated its first class in 1846. The first alumnus to fly as an astronaut was Alan Shepard, of the class of 1945. As of 2023, the most recent alumnus to be selected as an astronaut was Kayla Barron, of the class of 2010. Two alumni were part of Project Mercury, three were part of Project Gemini, seven were part of the Apollo program, three walked on the Moon, one was part of the Apollo–Soyuz Test Project, and forty-two were part of the Space Shuttle program.

In addition to the 52 astronauts who are alumni of the Academy, more than 990 noted scholars from a variety of academic fields are Academy graduates, including 45 Rhodes Scholars and 16 Marshall Scholars. Additional notable graduates include 1 President of the United States, 2 Nobel Prize recipients, and 73 Medal of Honor recipients.

== Astronauts ==
In this table, "class year" refers to the alumni's class year, which usually is the same year they graduated. However, in times of war, classes often graduated early. For example, the Class of 1943 actually graduated in 1942. (Note: The United States Air Force Academy did not graduate its first class until 1959, so a significant percentage of USNA graduates were commissioned in the US Air Force until that time.)

Name	Class year	Notability	References
Alan Shepard	1945	Rear admiral, World War II veteran, Navy test pilot, first U.S. Astronaut in space onboard Mercury-Redstone 3 and only Mercury Seven astronaut to walk on the Moon while commanding Apollo 14	
Wally Schirra	1946	Only astronaut to fly in America's first three space programs: Project Mercury (Mercury 8), Project Gemini (Gemini 6A), and Project Apollo (Apollo 7 Commander)	
James Irwin	1951	Served as an SR-71 Blackbird pilot and became a NASA astronaut, serving as the lunar module pilot on the Apollo 15, on which the first lunar rover was used; walked on the Moon	
Donn F. Eisele	1952	Test pilot, CMP on Apollo 7, the first Apollo program crewed mission	
Edward Givens	1952	Test pilot, died in an automobile crash before making a spaceflight	
Jim Lovell	1952	Served in the Korean War, Navy test pilot, astronaut participating in Gemini 7, Gemini 12, Apollo 8, and commanding the ill-fated Apollo 13, which he brought back safely	
Thomas P. Stafford	1952	Pilot, Gemini 6A, commanded Gemini 9A, Apollo 10, and Apollo-Soyuz Test Project	
Theodore Freeman	1953	Test pilot, died in a plane crash before making a spaceflight	
William Anders	1955	Astronaut, flew on Apollo 8; ambassador to Norway (1975–1977)	
Charles Duke	1957	Lunar Module Pilot Apollo 16; walked on the Moon	
Bruce McCandless II	1958	Performed the first un-tethered spacewalk on STS-41-B and also flew on STS-31; son of Rear Admiral Bruce McCandless, Medal of Honor recipient of World War II, class of 1932	
S. David Griggs	1962	Performed an unscheduled spacewalk during STS-51-D	
Robert C. Springer	1964	Mission specialist on STS-29 and STS-38	
John Oliver Creighton	1966	Pilot of STS-51-G, commanded STS-36 and STS-48	
David Walker	1966	Pilot of STS-51-A, commanded STS-30, STS-53 and STS-69	
James Buchli	1967	Mission specialist on STS-51-C, STS-61-A, STS-29 and STS-48	
Michael J. Smith	1967	Pilot of the Space Shuttle Challenger when it was destroyed during STS-51-L	
Charles Bolden	1968	Major General; United States Marine Corps test pilot; pilot of STS-61-C and STS-31; commanded STS-45 and STS-60; nominated in 2009 to be NASA Administrator	
Michael Coats	1968	Pilot of STS-41-D, and commanded STS-29 and STS-39	
Bryan D. O'Connor	1968	Pilot of STS-61-B, and commanded STS-40	
John M. Lounge	1969	Mission specialist on STS-51-I, STS-26 and STS-35	
Robert D. Cabana	1971	Pilot of STS-41 and STS-53, commanded STS-65 and STS-88	
Frank L. Culbertson Jr.	1971	Pilot of STS-38, commanded STS-51 and International Space Station Expedition 3	
David Leestma	1971	Mission specialist on STS-41-G, STS-28 and STS-45	
William Shepherd	1971	Mission specialist on STS-27, STS-41 and STS-52; commanded International Space Station Expedition 1	
John L. Phillips	1972	Mission specialist on STS-100 and STS-119; flight engineer of International Space Station Expedition 11	
Stephen S. Oswald	1973	Pilot of STS-42 and STS-56, commanded STS-67	
Kenneth S. Reightler Jr.	1973	Pilot of STS-48 and STS-60	
William F. Readdy	1974	Mission specialist on STS-42, pilot of STS-51 and commanded STS-79	
Stephen Thorne	1975	Test pilot and Space Shuttle program trainee, died in a plane crash before making a spaceflight	
Jerry M. Linenger	1977	Mission specialist on STS-64, and long-duration spaceflight on the Mir space station	
Pierre J. Thuot	1977	Mission specialist on STS-36, STS-49 and STS-62	
Ken Bowersox	1978	Pilot of STS-50, commanded STS-61, STS-73, STS-82 and International Space Station Expedition 6	
Daniel W. Bursch	1979	Mission specialist on STS-51, STS-68 and STS-77; flight engineer of International Space Station Expedition 4	
Michael Foreman	1979	Mission specialist on STS-123	
Dominic L. Pudwill Gorie	1979	Pilot of STS-91 and STS-99; commanded STS-108 and STS-123	
Joe F. Edwards Jr.	1980	United States Navy test pilot, pilot of STS-89	
Michael López-Alegría	1980	Mission specialist for STS-73, STS-92, and STS-113; commanded International Space Station Expedition 14. American record holder for space walks, with 10	
Kathryn P. Hire	1981	Mission specialist on STS-90 and STS-130	
Brent W. Jett Jr.	1981	Pilot of STS-72 and STS-81; commanded STS-97 and STS-115	
Wendy B. Lawrence	1981	Navy helicopter pilot and mission specialist for STS-67, STS-86, STS-91, and STS-114; daughter of William P. Lawrence, Superintendent of the Academy while she was a Midshipman	
Christopher Loria	1983	Assigned as the pilot of STS-113, but an injury resulted in medical disqualification from spaceflight	
William C. McCool	1983	Pilot of Space Shuttle Columbia, killed when the craft disintegrated during re-entry at the conclusion of STS-107	
Robert Curbeam	1984	Mission specialist on STS-85, STS-98 and STS-116	
Charles O. Hobaugh	1984	Pilot of STS-104 and STS-118; Commander of STS-129	
George D. Zamka	1984	Pilot of STS-120; Commander of STS-130	
Lisa Nowak	1985	Mission specialist on STS-121, terminated by NASA after arrest on an attempted kidnapping charge	
Stephen Frick	1986	Pilot of STS-110 and commanded STS-122	
Stephen Bowen	1986	Mission specialist on STS-126	
Sunita Williams	1987	Mission specialist on STS-116, STS-117 and SpaceX Crew-9, flight engineer for Expeditions 14, 15, 71 and 72; Commander of Expedition 33, Pilot of Starliner Crewed Flight Test. First female astronaut to fly on an orbital spacecraft's maiden flight.	
Kenneth Ham	1987	Pilot of STS-124	
Christopher Cassidy	1993	Mission specialist on STS-127, Commander of Expedition 63	
Nicole Aunapu Mann	1999	Selected in 2013 and completed astronaut training in 2015, commanded SpaceX Crew-5, first Native American woman in space	
Kayla Barron	2010	Selected in 2017, spent 177 days on the ISS as a member of NASA SpaceX Crew-3	

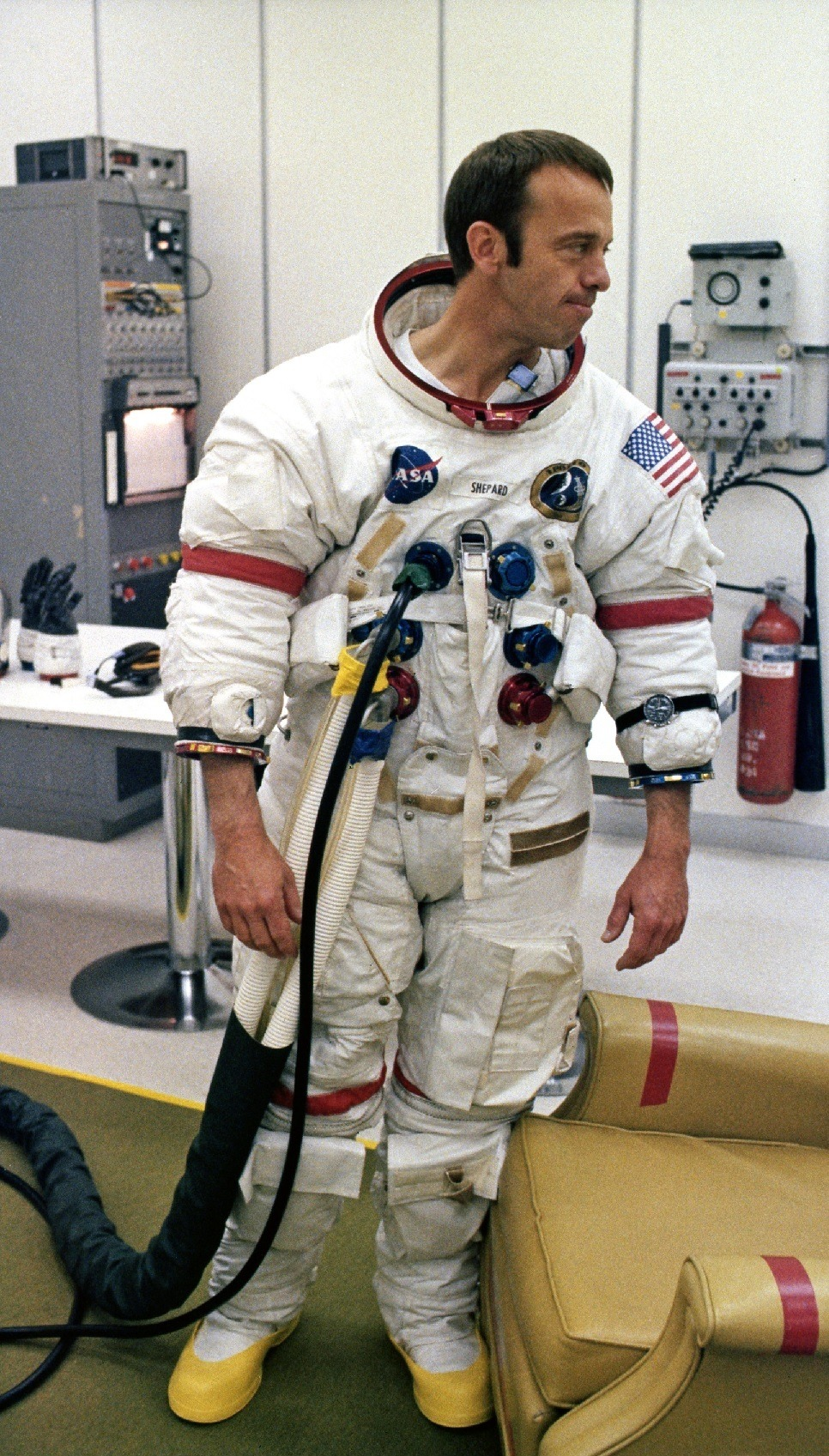
Alan Shepard

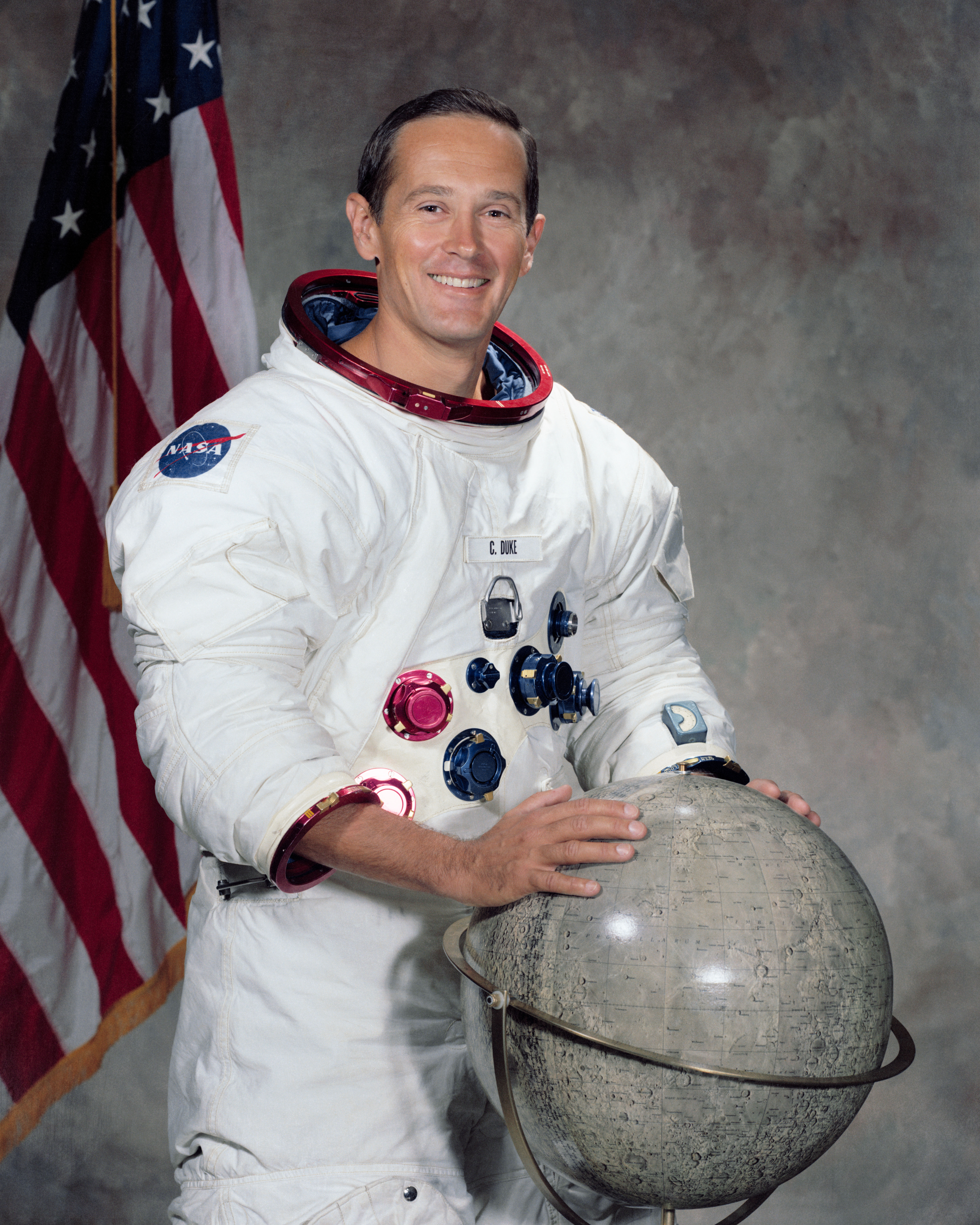
Charles Duke

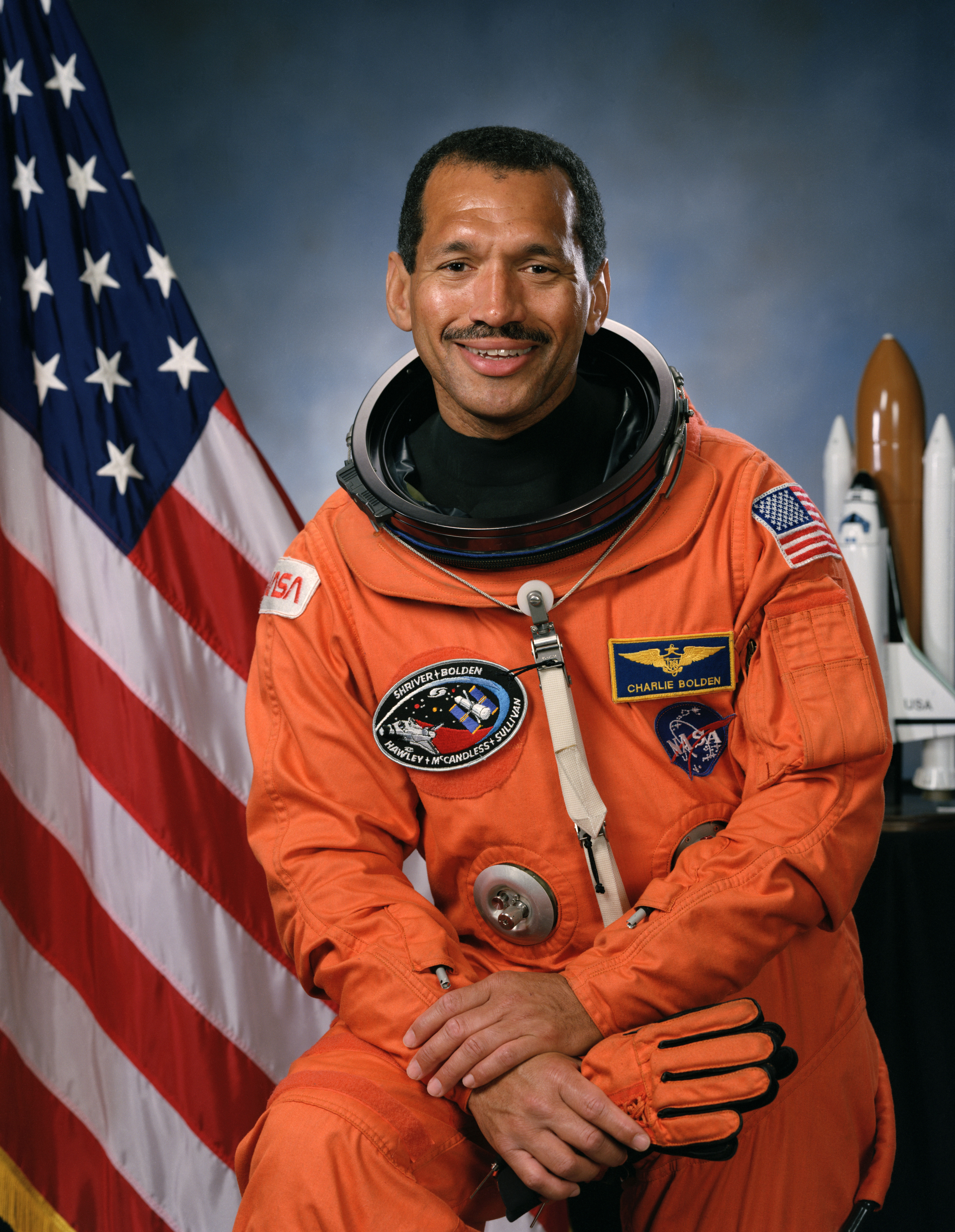
Charles Bolden

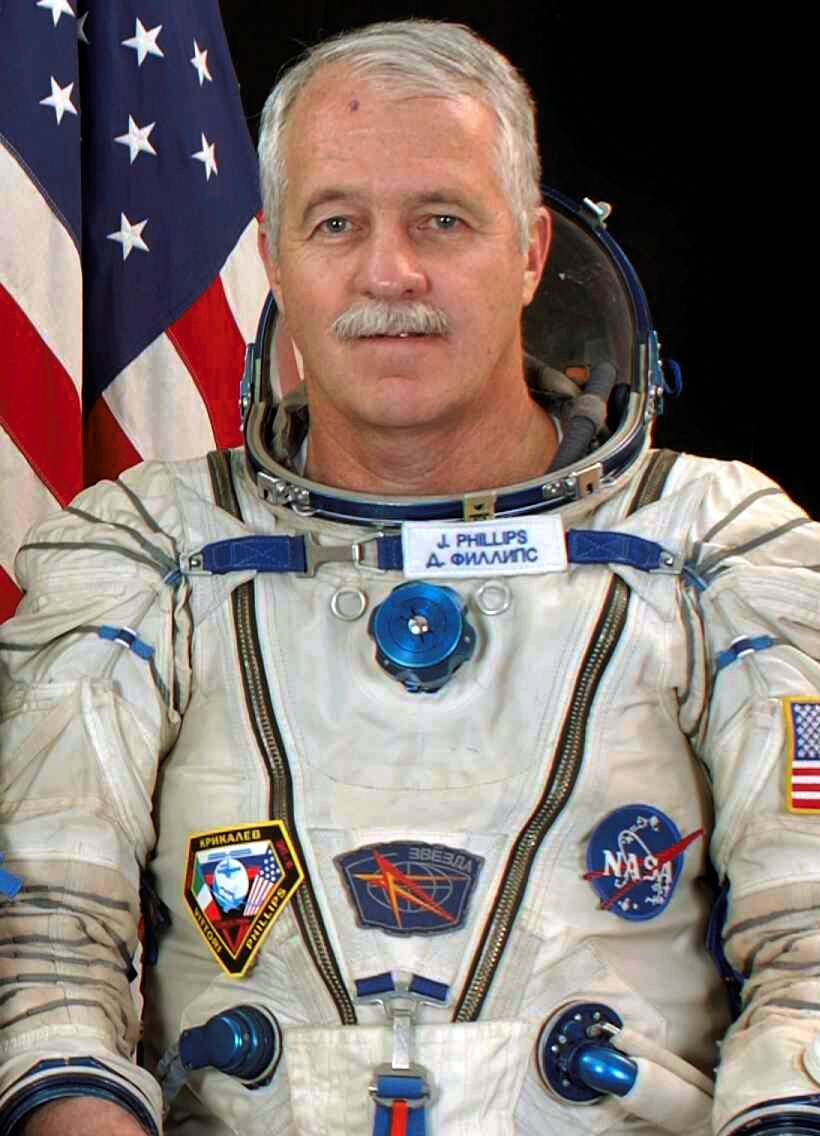
John L. Phillips

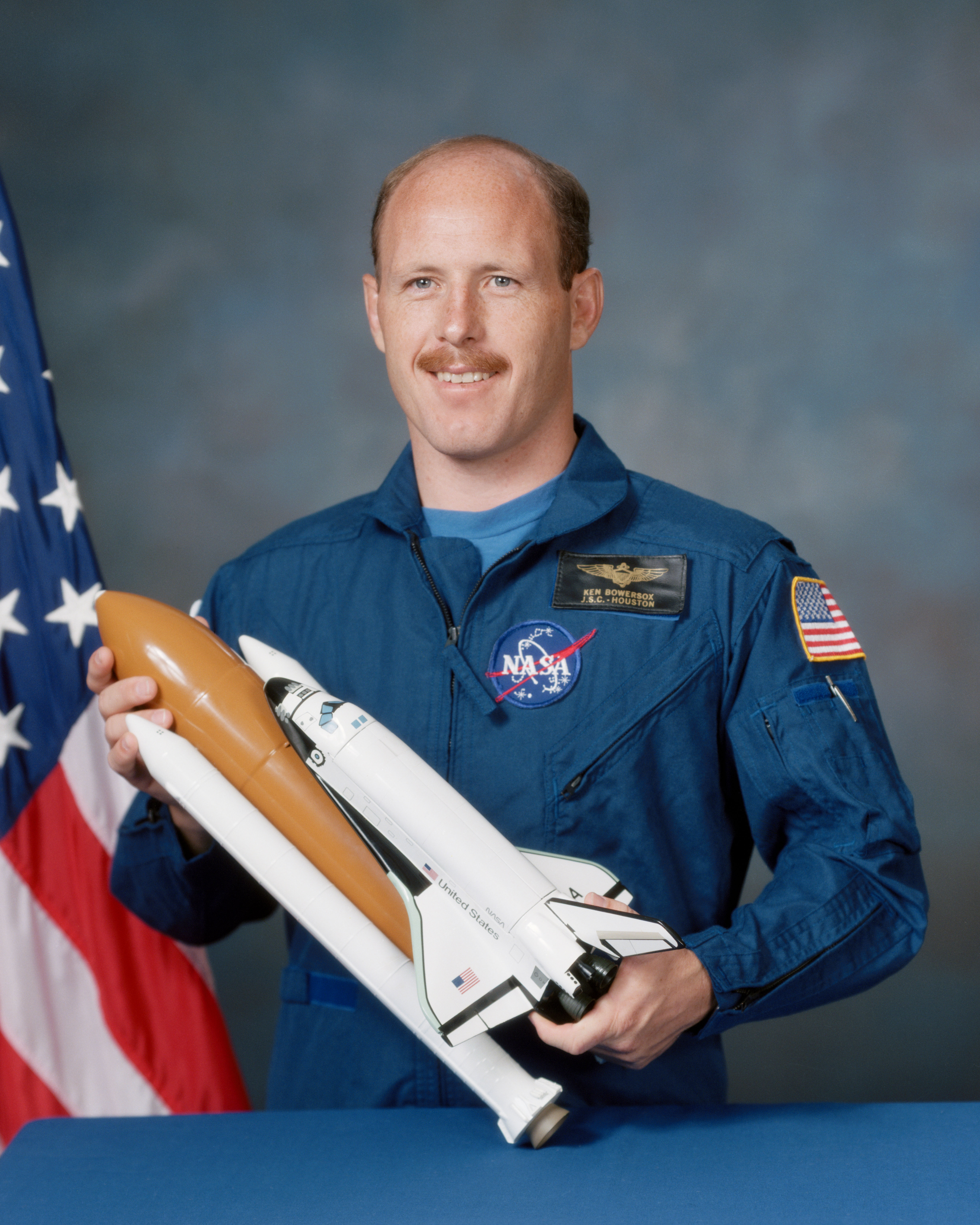
Ken Bowersox

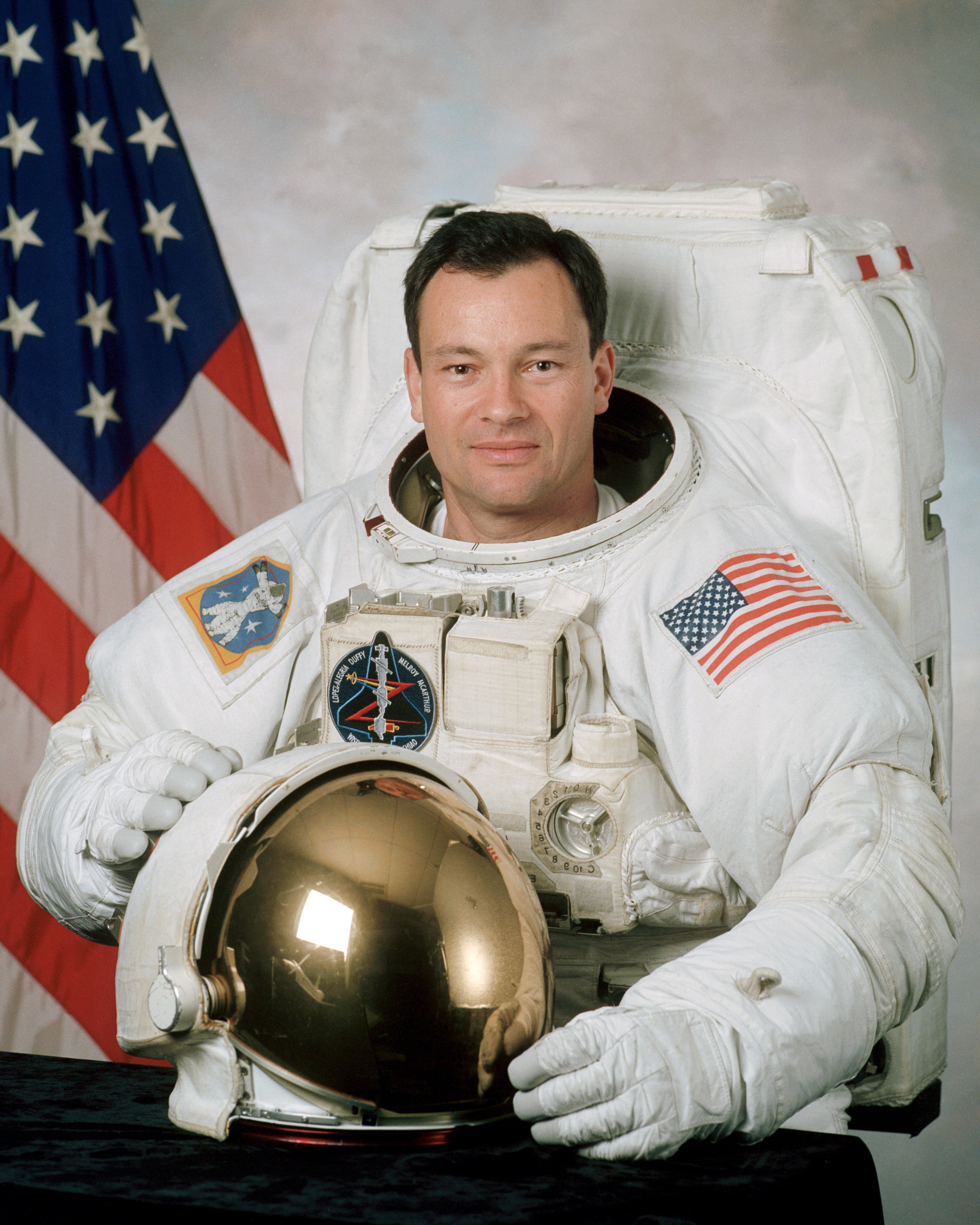
Michael Lopez-Alegria

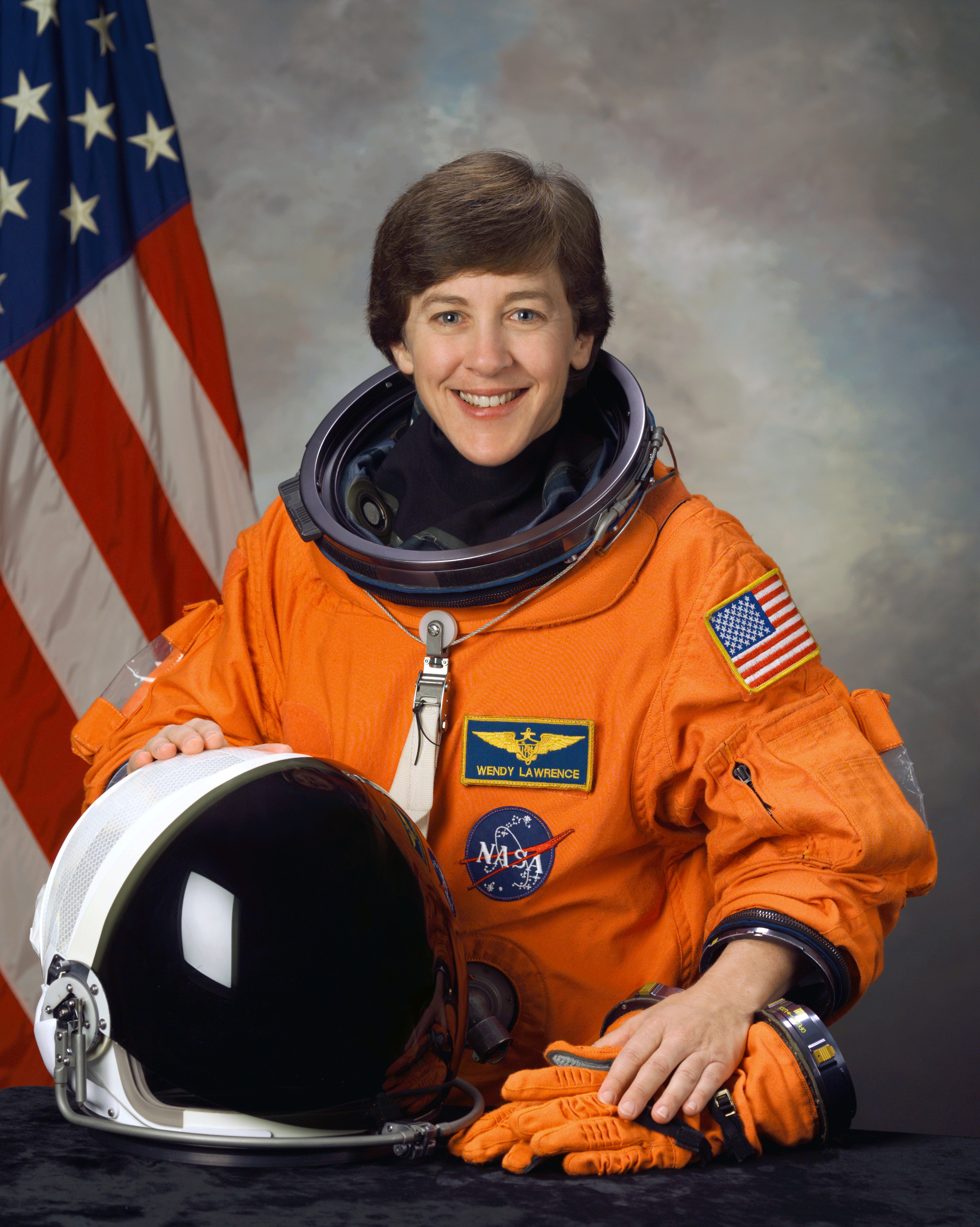
Wendy B. Lawrence

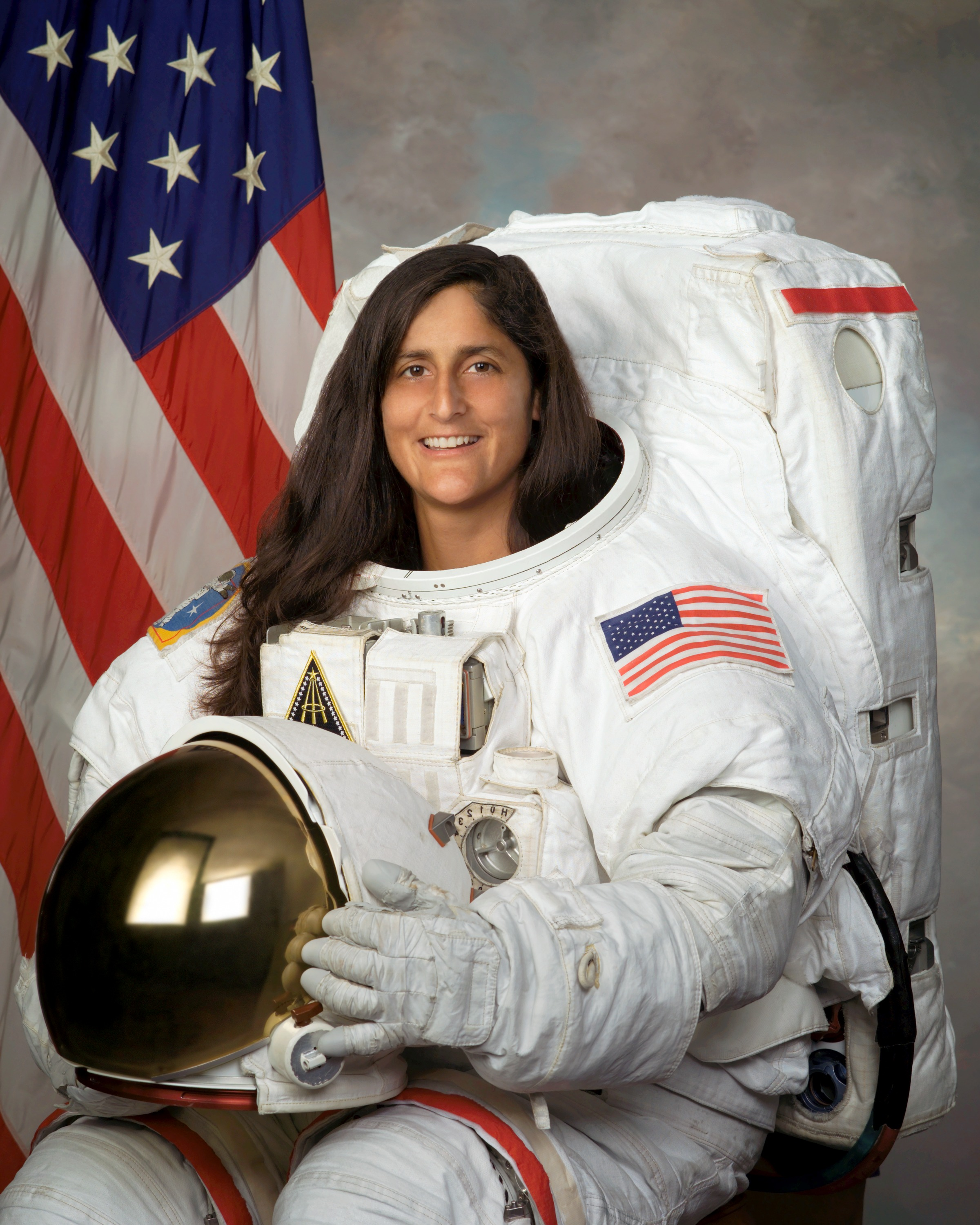
Sunita Williams

== See also ==
- United States Naval Academy
- List of astronauts educated at the United States Military Academy
- List of astronauts educated at the University of Colorado Boulder
