= Eberhard Gill =

German physicist and space systems engineer (1961–2026)

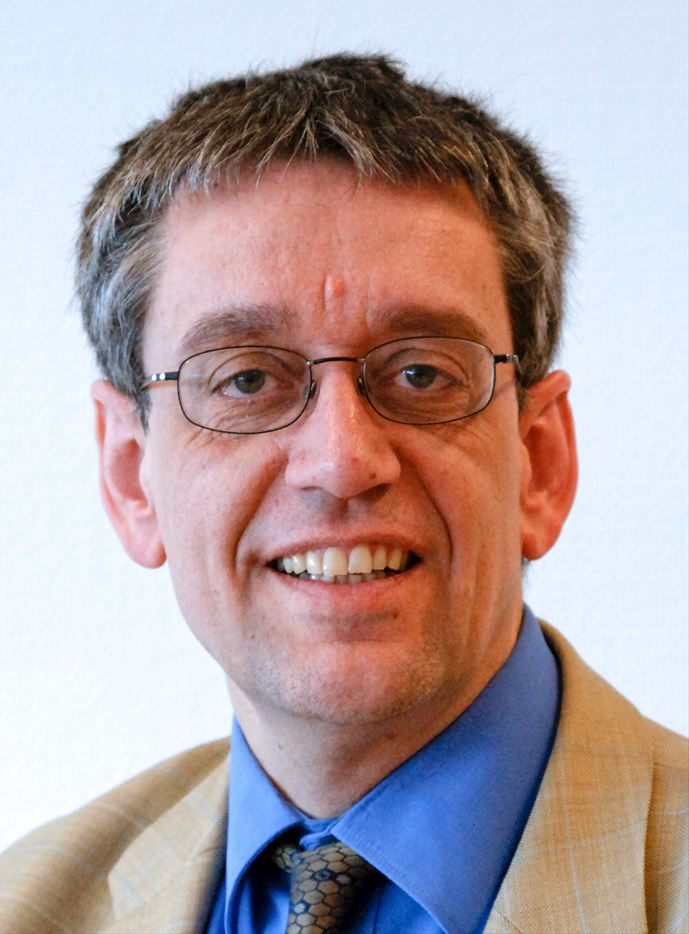
- Born: 1961; Öhringen, Baden-Württemberg, West Germany
- Died: 16 July 2026 (aged 64–65)
- Known for: satellite orbit determination, GNSS technology and tracking, space system engineering, miniaturisation, multi-satellite systems, systems engineering
- Scientific career
- Fields: Space engineering, Systems Engineering, Guidance, Navigation and Control
- Institutions: Delft University of Technology; German Aerospace Center; University of Tübingen

Eberhard Gill (1961 – 16 July 2026) was a German physicist and space systems engineer. He was a professor of space systems engineering at the Delft University of Technology. Gill authored and co-authored more than 300 peer-reviewed publications. He was a fellow of INCOSE and academician of the International Academy of Astronautics (IAA).

Gill served as the co-editor for systems engineering, the leading journal of INCOSE.

He was a member of three Technical Committees of the International Astronautical Federation (IAF): Astrodynamics Committee, Space Systems Committee and Space Education and Outreach Committee (SEOC).

Gill made significant contributions to the fields of guidance, navigation and control of space systems, satellite orbit determination, Global Navigation Satellite Systems (GNSS) as well as Systems engineering, miniaturization of space systems and multi-satellite systems, such as Satellite constellation .

Gill died in July 2026.

== Education ==
Gill earned a diploma in physics from University of Tübingen, Germany, in 1986. He earned a Ph.D. in Theoretical astrophysics in 1989 from University of Tübingen. His doctoral dissertation titled "Relativistic Gyroscope Motion and Gradiometry" was supervised by Hanns Ruder.

In 2005, he received a Master of space systems engineering (MSE), Delft University of Technology, The Netherlands.

== Research ==
From 1989 to 2006, Gill worked as scientist with the German Aerospace Center at the German Space Operations Center (GSOC) on satellite operations with a focus on satellite orbit determination for a variety of space missions, satellite tracking, navigation using GNSS receivers, autonomous navigation for the BIRD microsatellite and formation flying for the Prisma satellite mission

He joined the Delft University of Technology in 2007 as full professor and section head of space systems engineering. The Section is unique in its capabilities to innovate complete systems for space: from first principles to applications and from ideas to demonstration and usage in space. It educates scientists and engineers and inspires research to make the space domain more valuable to society. The Section has launched in 2008 the first Dutch university satellite, the triple-unit CubeSat Delfi-C3 and in 2013 its successor Delfi-n3Xt, also a triple-unit CubeSat. In 2022, the Section has launched the triple-unit PocketQube satellite Delfi-PQ with a mass of less than 0.6 kg. In 2015, Gill became also the founding Director of the TU Delft Space Institute. From 2013 to 2021, he was also Head of the Department of Space Engineering and member of the Management Team of the TU Delft Faculty of Aerospace Engineering. In 2023, he initiated the TU Delft Systems Engineering Platform. Since 2022, he led the research program on Optical Wireless Superhighways (FREE), a multi-university, multi-industry consortium.

=== Contributions ===
Gill did research on, developed or supervised development of a number of systems and methods including:

- General relativistc coupling of Lense-Thirring and Fokker precession of space-borne gyroscopes
- Search and rescue (SAR) based system for spacecraft using Galileo (satellite navigation)
- Reduced dynamic orbit determination using GPS code and carrier measurements
- Autonomous formation flying for the PRISMA mission
- Review of the robustness and applicability of monocular pose estimation systems for relative navigation with an uncooperative spacecraft

He was Byram Distinguished Visiting Professor in 2023 at the University of Colorado (CU), Boulder, in the Ann and H.J. Smead Department of Aerospace Engineering Sciences.

== Awards and honours ==
- DLR Scientific Award 1990
- DLR Scientific Award 2001
- DLR Team Prize to secure excellence 2004
- DLR Senior Scientist 2006
- Engineering Sciences Award of International Academy of Astronautics (IAA) 2018
- Breakwell Laureate of the Astrodynamics Section of the International Astronautical Federation (IAF) 2018
- INCOSE Fellow 2021

== Visiting scientist ==
- DLR research semester at Goddard Space Flight Center (NASA) 2002
- Byram Distinguished Visiting Professor at University of Colorado (CU), Boulder, Ann and H.J. Smead Department of Aerospace Engineering Science 2023

== Selected works ==
Gill co-authored various books, such as:

- Montenbruck, Oliver; Gill, Eberhard (June 2000). Satellite Orbits: Models, Methods and Applications. Heidelberg DE: Springer. doi:10.1007/978-3-642-58351-3. ISBN 978-3-540-67280-7.
- Muller, Gerrit; Gill, Eberhard (June 2009). Larson; Kirkpatrick; Sellers; Thomas; Verma (eds.). System Integration in Applied Space Systems Engineering. New York: McGraw-Hill. ISBN 978-0-07-340886-6.
- D'Errico, Marco; Gill, Eberhard; Moccia, Antonio; Sandau, Rainer (2013). Future Trends, Potential , Distributed Space Missions for Earth System Monitoring. New York: Springer. doi:10.1007/978-1-4614-4541-8. ISBN 978-1-4614-4540-1.

He also published many articles in academic publications such as:

- Gill, E.; Schastok, J.; Soffel, M. H.; Ruder, H. (1989). "On the Mashhoon-Theiss "anomaly"". Physical Review. 39 (8): 2441–2443. Bibcode:1989PhRvD..39.2441G. doi:10.1103/PhysRevD.39.2441. PMID 9959933.
- Montenbruck, O.; Van Helleputte, T.; Kroes, R.; Gill, E. (2005). "Reduced dynamic orbit determination using GPS code and carrier measurements". Aerospace Science and Technology. 9 (3): 261–271. Bibcode:2005AeST....9..261M. doi:10.1016/j.ast.2005.01.003.
- Gill, E.; D'Amico, S.; Montenbruck, O. (2007). "Autonomous formation flying for the PRISMA mission". Journal of Spacecraft and Rockets. 44 (3): 671–681. Bibcode:2007JSpRo..44..671G. doi:10.2514/1.23015.
- Pasqualetto Cassinis, L.; Fonod, R.; Gill, E. (2019). "Review of the robustness and applicability of monocular pose estimation systems for relative navigation with an uncooperative spacecraft". Progress in Aerospace Sciences. 110. Bibcode:2019PrAeS.11000548P. doi:10.1016/j.paerosci.2019.05.008.
