= List of astronauts educated at the United States Military Academy =

Buzz Aldrin

The United States Military Academy (USMA) is an undergraduate college in West Point, New York that educates and commissions officers for the United States Army. Twenty-one graduates of the Military Academy have been selected for astronaut training by the National Aeronautics and Space Administration (NASA), the third most out of any college in the United States. The first alumnus to graduate and go on to become an astronaut was Frank Borman, class of 1950. As of August 2022, the most recent alumnus to become an astronaut was Anne McClain, class of 2002. Five alumni were part of Project Gemini, six part of the Apollo program, two have walked on the Moon, and twelve were part of the Space Shuttle program.

== Astronauts ==
Note: "Class year" refers to the alumni's class year, which usually is the same year they graduated. However, in times of war, classes often graduate early.

Name	Class year	Notability	References
Frank Borman	1950	Commanded Gemini 7 and Apollo 8; first to orbit Moon and to see far side of the Moon	
Buzz Aldrin	1951	Pilot of Gemini 12 and Lunar Module Pilot on Apollo 11; 2nd person to walk on the Moon	
Michael Collins	1952	Pilot of Gemini 10 and Command Module Pilot on Apollo 11	
Ed White	1952	Pilot of Gemini 4, died in the Apollo 1 fire; first American to perform a spacewalk; buried at West Point	
David Scott	1954	Pilot of Gemini 8, Command Module Pilot of Apollo 9, and Commander of Apollo 15; walked on the Moon	
Donald H. Peterson	1955	Mission Specialist on STS-6	
Alfred Worden	1955	Command Module Pilot of Apollo 15	
Richard M. Mullane	1967	Mission Specialist on STS-41-D, STS-27, and STS-36	
Sherwood C. Spring	1967	Mission Specialist on STS-61-B	
James C. Adamson	1969	Mission Specialist on STS-28 and STS-43	
William S. McArthur	1973	Mission Specialist on STS-58, STS-74, and STS-92; commanded International Space Station Expedition 12	
Michael R. Clifford	1974	Mission Specialist on STS-53, STS-59, and STS-76	
Charles D. Gemar	1979	Mission Specialist on STS-38, STS-48, and STS-62	
Patrick G. Forrester	1979	Mission Specialist on STS-105, STS-117, and STS-128	
Jeffrey Williams	1980	Mission Specialist on STS-101; Flight Engineer of ISS Expeditions 13 and 21, Commander of Expedition 22	
Douglas H. Wheelock	1983	Mission Specialist on STS-120; Flight Engineer of ISS Expedition 24 and Commander of Expedition 25	
Timothy L. Kopra	1985	Flight Engineer of International Space Station Expeditions 19 and 20	
Robert S. Kimbrough	1989	Mission Specialist on STS-126	
Francisco Rubio	1998	Soyuz MS-22/Soyuz MS-23 (Expedition 67/68/69)	
Andrew R. Morgan	1998	Soyuz MS-13/Soyuz MS-15 (Expedition 60/61/62)	
Anne McClain	2002	Soyuz MS-11 (Expedition 58/59); SpaceX Crew-10 (Expedition 72/73)	

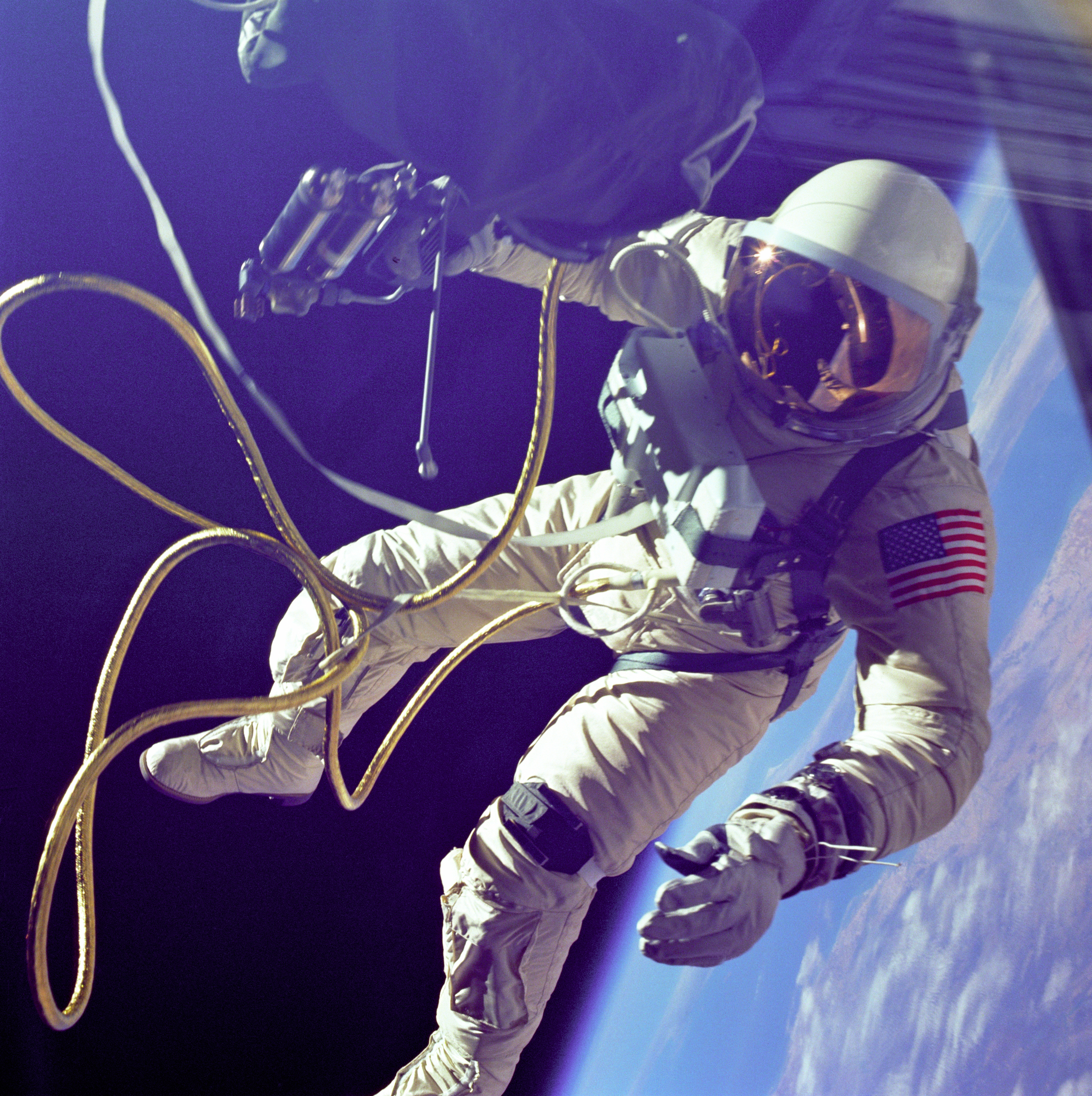
Ed White

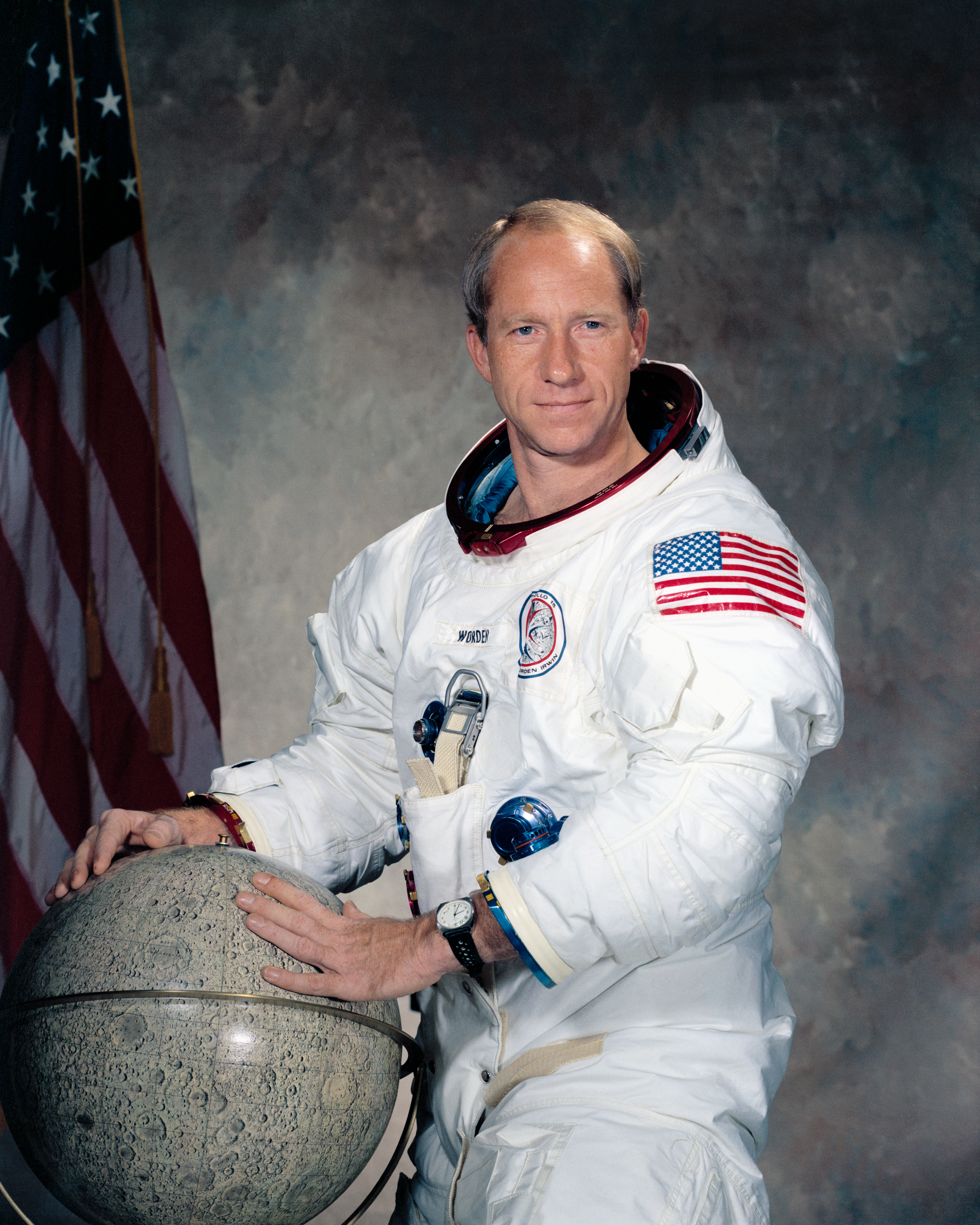
Alfred Worden

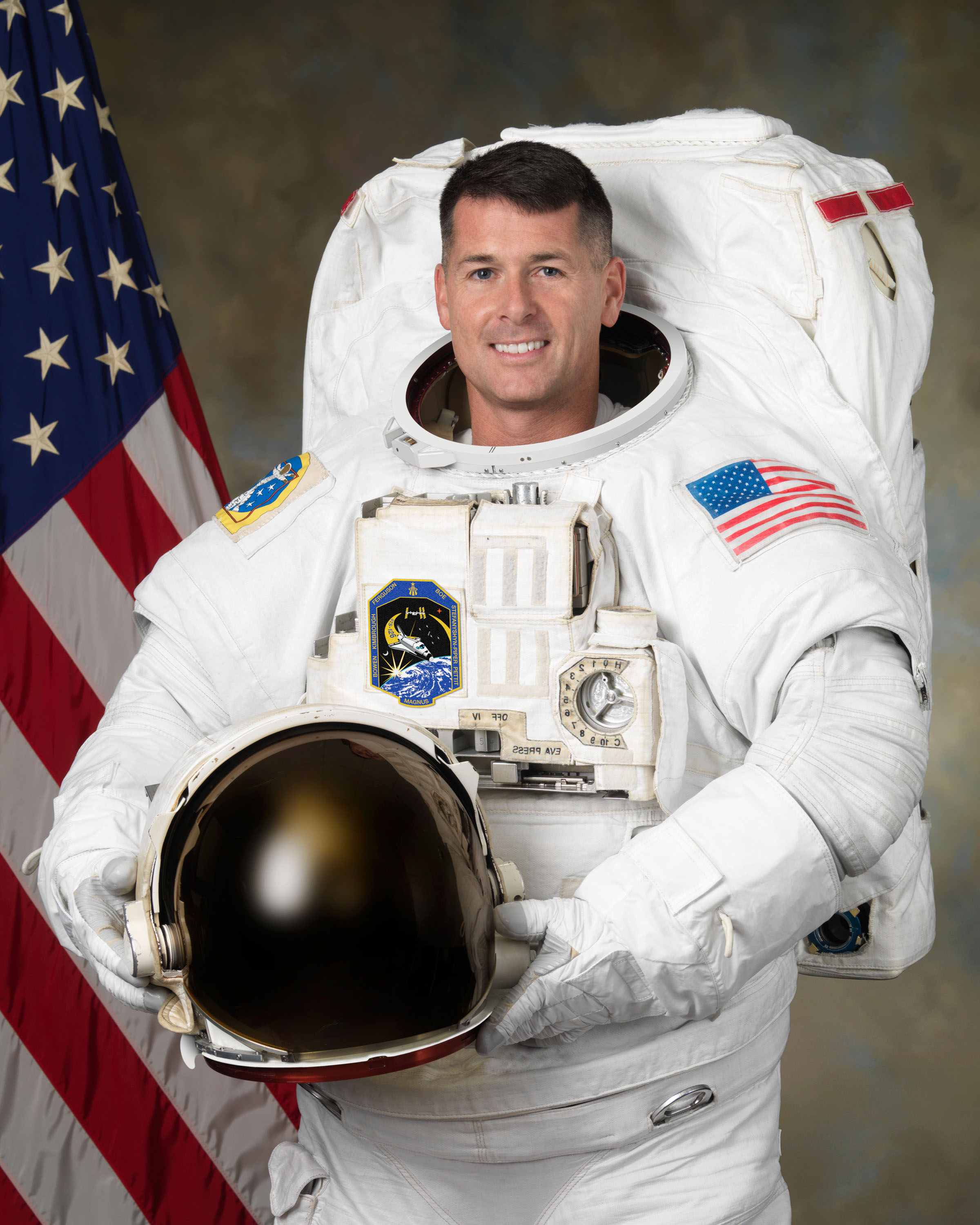
Shane Kimbrough

== See also ==
- United States Military Academy
- List of astronauts educated at the United States Naval Academy
- List of astronauts educated at the University of Colorado Boulder
