= Cameron Jones (astronaut) =

American Air Force officer

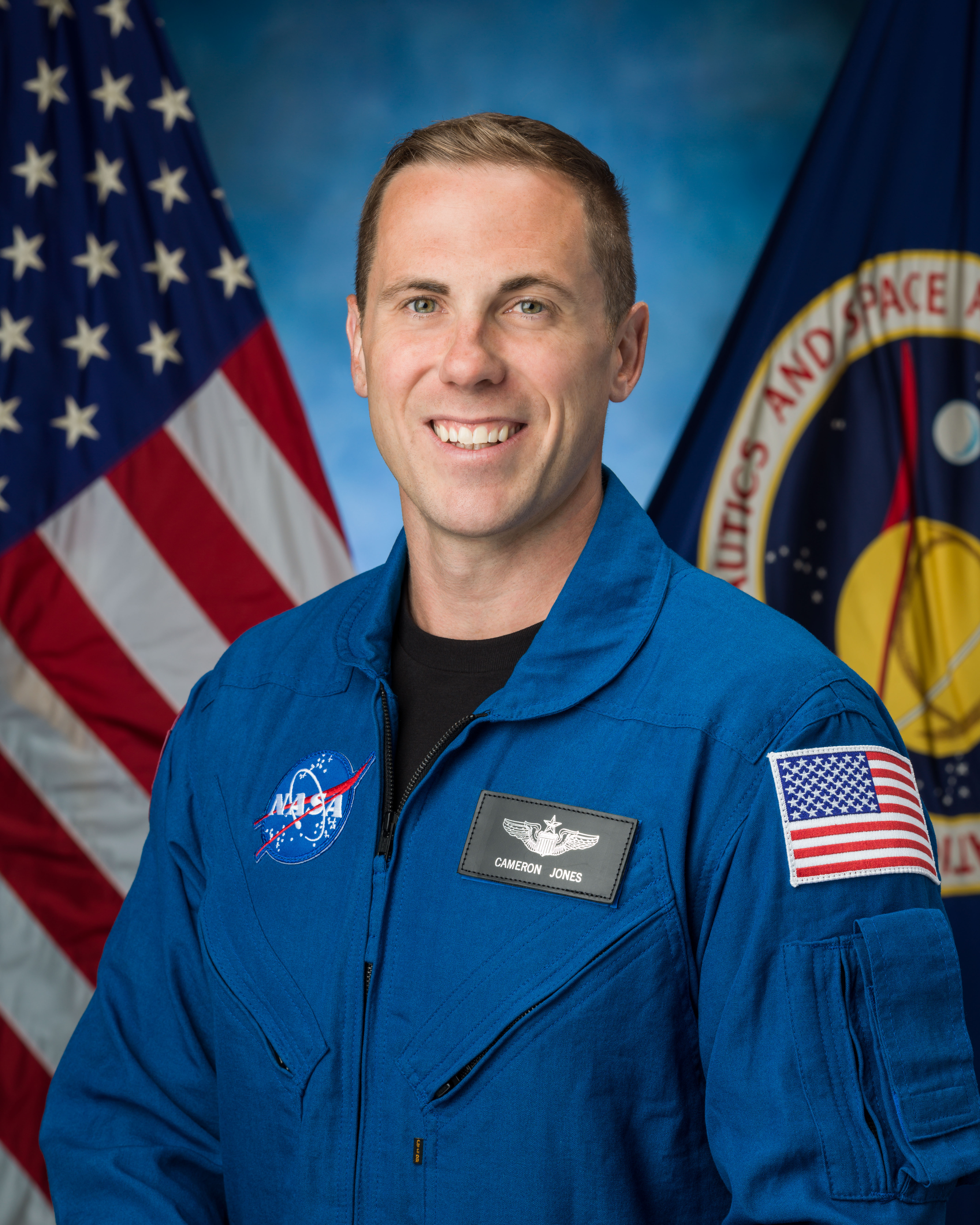
- Jones in 2025
- Born: Iowa, U.S.
- Education: University of Illinois Urbana-Champaign (BS, MS)
- Space career
- Rank: Major, United States Air Force
- Selection: NASA Group 24 (2025)

Cameron Jones is an American United States Air Force officer, test pilot, and NASA astronaut candidate. He was selected in 2025 as a member of NASA Astronaut Group 24, the 24th NASA astronaut candidate class. At the time of his selection, Jones was a major in the U.S. Air Force and an Air Force Academic Fellow at the Defense Advanced Research Projects Agency (DARPA).

== Early life and education ==
Jones was born in Iowa and considers Savanna, Illinois, to be his hometown. He graduated from West Carroll High School in Savanna.

Jones earned a bachelor's degree in aerospace engineering from the University of Illinois Urbana-Champaign in 2012 and a master's degree in aerospace engineering from the same university in 2018. He later earned a master's degree in flight test engineering from the United States Air Force Test Pilot School at Edwards Air Force Base in 2022 and graduated from the United States Air Force Weapons School at Nellis Air Force Base.

== Military career ==
After completing his bachelor's degree, Jones was commissioned into the U.S. Air Force through the University of Illinois' Reserve Officers' Training Corps program. He then attended the Euro-NATO Joint Jet Pilot Training program at Sheppard Air Force Base in Texas, where he earned his pilot wings and received a follow-on assignment to fly the F-22 Raptor.

Jones' first operational assignment was with the 94th Fighter Squadron at Langley Air Force Base in Virginia. He later served at Elmendorf Air Force Base in Alaska and at Nellis Air Force Base in Nevada. After completing the Air Force Weapons School, he returned to Alaska as weapons officer for the 525th Fighter Squadron.

Following graduation from the Air Force Test Pilot School, Jones conducted developmental flight tests on the F-22 and served as director of operations with the 411th Flight Test Squadron at Edwards Air Force Base. By the time NASA selected him as an astronaut candidate, he had accumulated more than 1,600 flight hours in more than 30 aircraft, including more than 300 flight-test hours and 150 combat hours. Most of his flight time was in the F-22 Raptor.

== NASA career ==
NASA announced Jones' selection as a member of its 2025 astronaut candidate class on September 22, 2025. The class consisted of 10 candidates selected from more than 8,000 applicants. Jones reported for duty at Johnson Space Center in Houston in September 2025 to begin approximately two years of initial astronaut training before becoming eligible for flight assignments.

The 2025 astronaut candidate class was later nicknamed the "Platypi" by the preceding NASA astronaut class.

== Awards and honors ==
Jones' military decorations and honors include the Meritorious Service Medal, Air Medal, Aerial Achievement Medal with one oak leaf cluster, Air and Space Commendation Medal with one oak leaf cluster, National Defense Service Medal, Inherent Resolve Campaign Medal with service star, and Global War on Terrorism Service Medal. His academic and aviation honors include the Liethen-Tittle Award for Top Test Pilot and Distinguished Graduate recognition at the U.S. Air Force Test Pilot School, the Outstanding Graduate Award and Academic Award at the U.S. Air Force Weapons School, and the AIAA Scholastic Achievement Award at the University of Illinois.

== Personal life ==
Jones is married and has one daughter.

== See also ==
- NASA Astronaut Group 24
- List of astronauts by year of selection
- List of University of Illinois Urbana-Champaign people
