= Brian Argrow =

American aerospace engineer

- Born: Stroud, Oklahoma, US

Academic background
- Education: BSc, Aerospace Engineering, 1983, MSc, Mechanical Engineering, 1986, PhD, Aerospace Engineering, 1989, University of Oklahoma
- Thesis: A computational analysis of the transonic flow field of two-dimensional mininum length nozzles (1989)
- Doctoral advisor: George Emanuel

Brian Maurice Argrow is an American aerospace engineer and Professor in the Department of Aerospace Engineering Sciences at the University of Colorado Boulder. Currently, he serves as the Chair of the department. Argrow specializes in the field of hypersonic aerodynamics, rarefied gas dynamics, dense gas dynamics, and UAVs.

== Early life and education ==
Argrow was born to parents Essie Argrow and Lavonne Davis in Oklahoma where he attended Stroud High School. Following high school, Argrow graduated from the University of Oklahoma (OU) on the Dean's Honor Roll in 1983. Upon graduating with his Bachelor's degree, he spent three months with Aerospace Engineering Support in El Segundo, California before pursuing his Master's degree. He then returned to the University of Oklahoma for his Master of Science degree and PhD, where he earned the 1989 national Black Engineer of the Year Award in the student leadership category.

== Career ==
Upon completing his PhD, Argrow accepted an assistant professor position at the University of Oklahoma's School of Aerospace and Mechanical Engineering from 1989 to 1992. He left OU in 1992 to accept a similar faculty position at the University of Colorado Boulder's (CU Boulder) Ann and H.J. Smead Department of Aerospace Engineering Sciences. Upon joining the faculty, Argrow's research team was the first to verify the method of osculating cones for supersonic waverider design. He also created a shock tube to create uniform static initial conditions near 800 °F to explore non-classical dense gas dynamics. As a result of his research, Argrow was the 2000 recipient of the President's Teaching Scholar.

In 2004, Argrow became the founding director of the Research and Engineering Center for Unmanned Vehicles (RECUV) at CU Boulder. In this role, Argrow continued to monitor hurricanes while collaborating with Erik Rasmussen through the Norman-based National Severe Storms Laboratory. He also served in various leadership roles outside of CU Boulder including co-chairing the first Symposium for Civilian Applications of Unmanned Aircraft Systems and serving on the NASA Advisory Council's Unmanned aerial vehicle Subcommittee. In 2007, Argrow was appointed the associate dean for education in the College of Engineering and Applied Science. Two years later, he was one of the leaders of the Verification of the Origins of Rotation in Tornadoes Experiment 2, the largest scientific study of twisters in history. In this role, he helped track the formation of tornados through the central Great Plains by co-developing an unmanned aerial vehicle to fly into the middle of the storm.

Argrow's research team later collaborated with researchers at the University of Nebraska–Lincoln to intercept supercells with an Unmanned Aerial Systems for the first time. Through funding from the National Severe Storms Laboratory (NSSL), Argrow's research team flew a UAS across northeast Colorado to collect sample outflows from several supercells. In 2014, Argrow completed a semester sabbatical at the National Oceanic and Atmospheric Administration NSSL at the National Weather Center. Upon returning from his sabbatical, Agrow was elected a Fellow of the American Institute of Aeronautics and Astronautics as someone who had contributed and advanced the aerospace industry. A few years later, he was named the inaugural holder of the Schaden Leadership Chair in Aerospace Engineering Sciences.

In February 2022, Argrow was elected a Member of the National Academy of Engineering for "contributions to unmanned aerial systems capable of penetrating severe storms and leadership in their application to scientific observation."

== Personal life ==
Argrow and his wife Gwen have one daughter together.
