= Adam Fuhrmann =

American NASA astronaut candidate and Air Force major (born 1989)

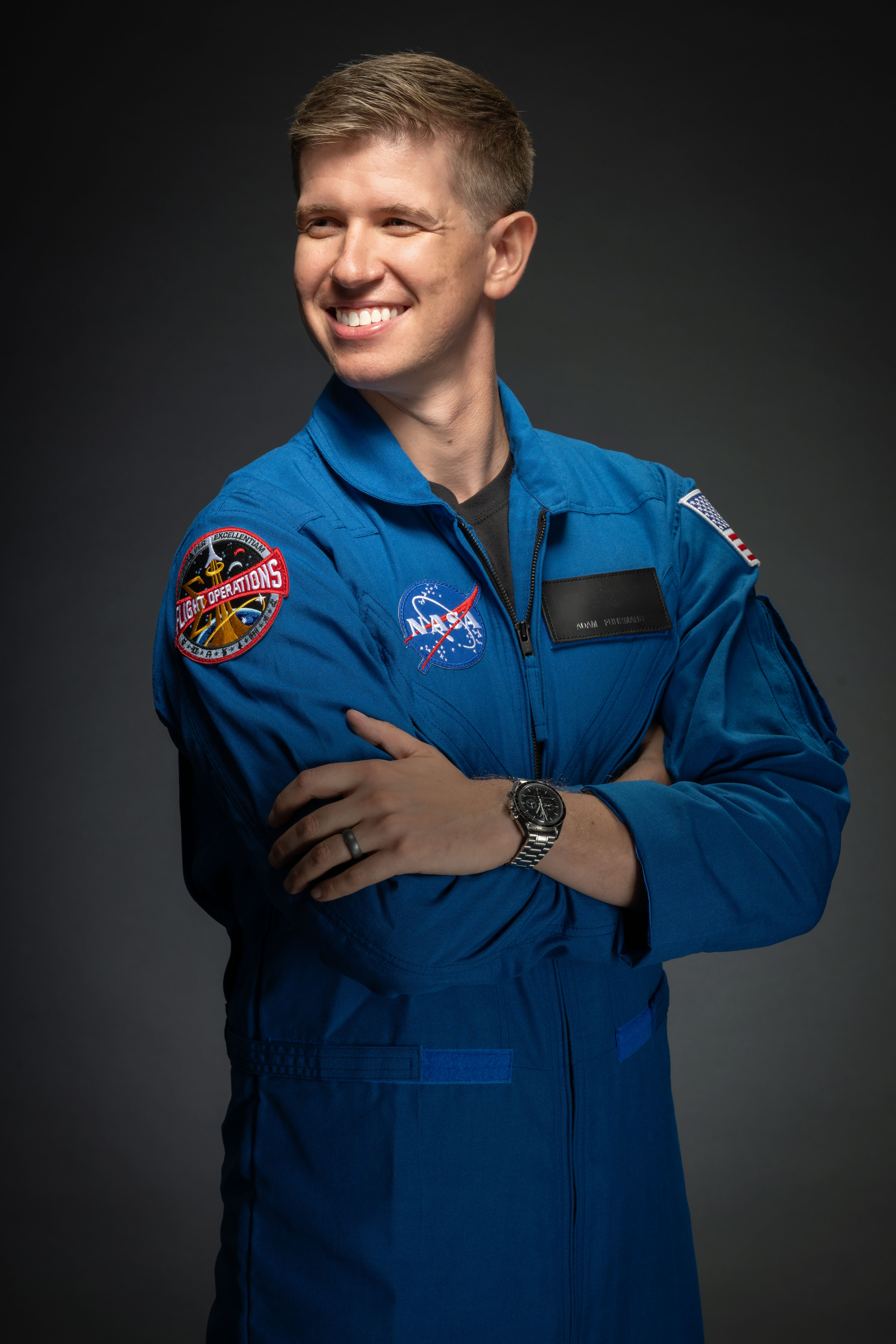
- Fuhrmann in 2025
- Born: Adam Matthew Fuhrmann; October 19, 1989 (age 36); Brandywine, Pennsylvania, U.S.
- Education: Massachusetts Institute of Technology (BS); Air University (MS); Purdue University (MS)
- Children: 3
- Space career

NASA astronaut candidate
- Selection: NASA Group 24 (2025)
- Military career
- Branch: United States Air Force
- Rank: Major
- Units: 416th Flight Test Squadron; 461st Flight Test Squadron
- Conflicts: War in Afghanistan

Adam Fuhrmann (born October 19, 1989) is an American NASA astronaut candidate and Air Force major.

== Early life and education ==
Fuhrmann was born in Brandywine, Pennsylvania, but considers Leesburg, Virginia to be his hometown. Fuhrmann graduated from Heritage High School in 2007. Fuhrmann studied aerospace engineering at the Massachusetts Institute of Technology with a minor in political science, earning his bachelor’s in 2011. Fuhrmann earned his master’s in flight test engineering from the United States Air Force Test Pilot School at Air University in 2020. Fuhrmann earned an additional master’s in systems engineering from Purdue University in 2022.

== Career ==
Prior to joining NASA, Fuhrmann served as an operational F-16 instructor pilot at Shaw Air Force Base, Kunsan Air Base, and Holloman Air Force Base. In 2016, Fuhrmann was deployed as part of Operation Freedom’s Sentinel and Operation Resolute Support. After, Fuhrmann served in the 416th and 461st Flight Test Squadrons at Edwards Air Force Base.

== Personal life ==
Fuhrmann is married to Shauna Fuhrmann. They have three children.

== Awards ==
- Defense Meritorious Service Medal
- Meritorious Service Medal
- Air Medal
- Aerial Achievement Medal
- Air and Space Commendation Medal
- Afghanistan Campaign Medal
- Korea Defense Service Medal
- Distinguished Graduate of the U.S. Air Force Test Pilot School, Squadron Officer School, and Air Force ROTC
