= List of astronauts educated at the University of Colorado Boulder =

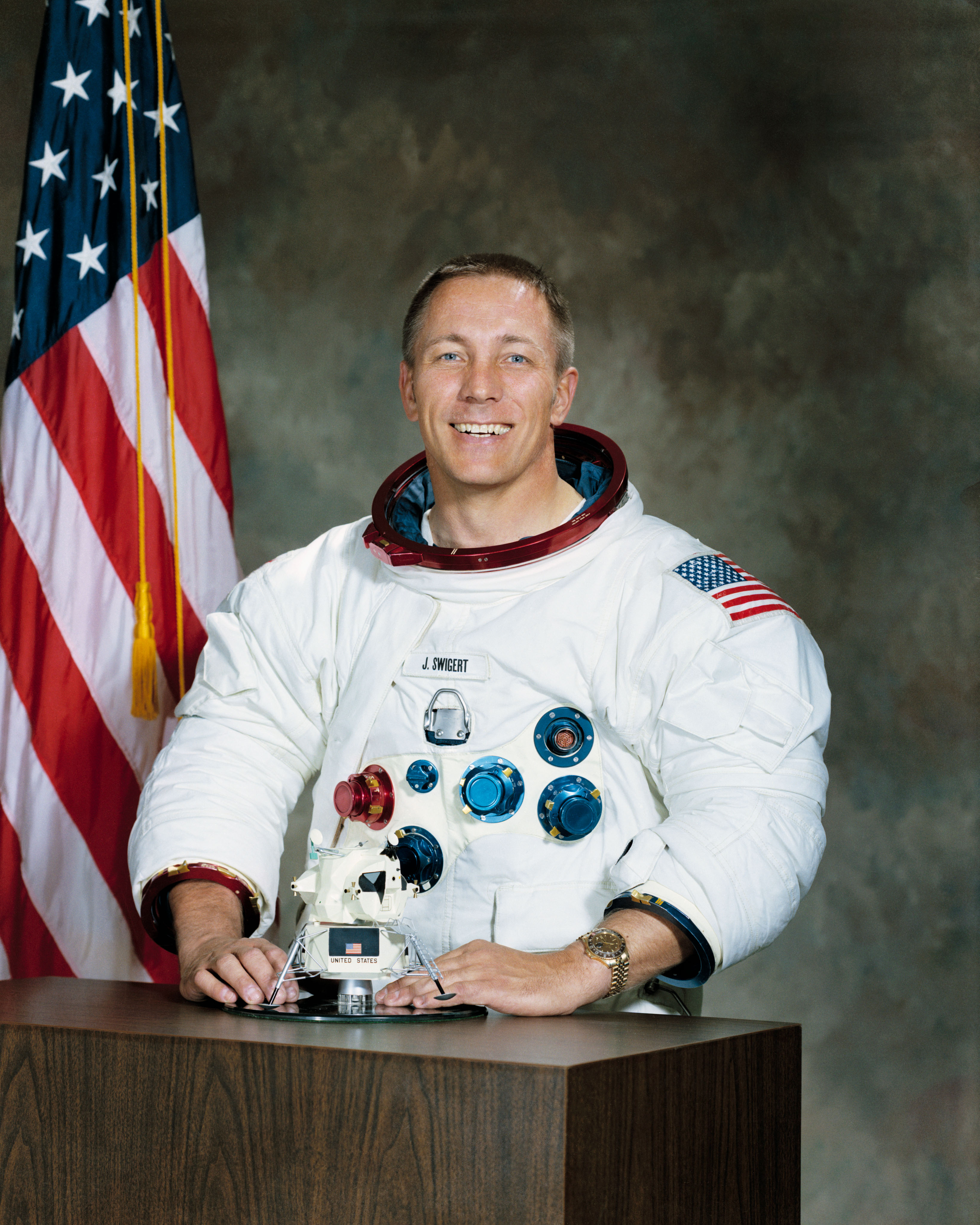
Apollo 13 astronaut Jack Swigert in 1971

As of 2026, 16 United States astronauts have graduated from the University of Colorado Boulder (CU), one of the highest numbers among non-military undergraduate institutions. In total, 24 astronauts from NASA, JAXA, and private space companies have been affiliated with the university as students, faculty, or researchers.

CU Boulder is a public university in Boulder, Colorado, and the flagship school of the University of Colorado system. The university established the Ann and H.J. Smead Department of Aerospace Engineering Sciences in 1946 and the BioServe Space Technologies institute for microgravity research in 1987. It receives the highest amount of NASA funding for scientific research among public universities. Along with MIT, CU is one of the only universities in the United States with a graduate aerospace curriculum that focuses on bioastronautics and human spaceflight.

The first alumnus to fly as an astronaut was Scott Carpenter, selected in 1959 as one of the Mercury Seven. As of 2026, the most recent alumna to be selected as an astronaut was Erin Overcash, of the class of 2014. One alumnus was part of Project Mercury, two were part of the Apollo program, one was part of the Apollo–Soyuz Test Project, and a dozen were part of the Space Shuttle program.

In addition to the 16 astronauts who are alumni of CU Boulder, the university has produced 10 Olympic medalists, 12 Nobel Prize laureates, 10 Pulitzer Prize winners, 11 MacArthur Fellows, 1 Turing Award laureate, and 2 associate justices of the U.S. Supreme Court.

== Astronauts ==
No.	Photograph	Name	Class Year	Degree	Notability	References
1		Scott Carpenter	1949	B.S. in Aerospace Engineering (conferred 1962)	Mercury Seven astronaut; 2nd American to orbit Earth; 4th American in space	
2		Jack Swigert	1953	B.S. in Mechanical Engineering	Command module pilot on Apollo 13; U.S. Congressman for Colorado's 6th congressional district	
3		Stuart Roosa	1960	B.S. in Aerospace Engineering	Command module pilot on Apollo 14; completed 34 orbits around the Moon	
4		Vance Brand	1953; 1960	B.A. in Business; B.S. in Aerospace Engineering	Command module pilot for Apollo-Soyuz; commander on STS-5, STS-41-B, and STS-35	
5		Ellison Onizuka	1969	B.S. and M.S. in Aerospace Engineering	Mission specialist on STS-51-C and STS-51-L; died in Space Shuttle Challenger disaster; 1st Asian American in space	
6		Loren Acton	1965	Ph.D. in Astrophysics	Payload Specialist on STS-51-F (Spacelab-2)	
7		John Lounge	1970	M.S. in Astrophysics	Mission specialist on STS-51-I and STS-26; flight engineer on STS-35	
8		Marsha Ivins	1973	B.S. in Aerospace Engineering	Mission specialist on STS-32, STS-46, STS-62, STS-81, and STS-98	
9		Samuel Durrance	1980	Ph.D. in Astrophysics	Payload specialist on STS-35 and STS-67; executive director of the Florida Space Research Institute	
10		Richard Hieb	1979	M.S. in Aerospace Engineering	Mission specialist on STS-39 and STS-49; payload commander on STS-65; scholar in residence at CU Boulder	
11		James Voss	1974	M.S. in Aerospace Engineering	Mission specialist on STS-44, STS-53, STS-69, and STS-101; flight engineer on Expedition 2 (STS-102 / STS-105); completed 202 days in space and 4 spacewalks totaling 22 hours and 45 minutes; scholar in residence at CU Boulder	
12		Ronald Sega	1982	Ph.D. in Electrical Engineering	Mission specialist on STS-60 and STS-76; Under Secretary of the U.S. Air Force	
13		Kalpana Chawla	1988	Ph.D. in Aerospace Engineering	Mission specialist and robotic arm operator on STS-87 and STS-107; 1st Indian woman in space; died in Space Shuttle Columbia disaster	
14		Steven Swanson	1983	B.S. in Engineering Physics	Mission specialist on STS-117 and STS-119; flight engineer on Soyuz TMA-12M (Expedition 39/40); completed 195 days in space and 5 spacewalks totaling 27 hours and 58 minutes	
15		Kjell Lindgren	2002	M.D.	Flight engineer on Soyuz TMA-17M (Expedition 44/45); commander on SpaceX Crew-4 (Expedition 67/68); completed 312 days in space and 2 spacewalks totaling 15 hours and 4 minutes	
16		Erin Overcash	2014; 2017	B.S. in Aerospace Engineering; M.S. in Bioastronautics	Astronaut candidate in NASA Astronaut Group 24	

== Commercial astronauts ==
In addition, four alumni educated at the university were selected as commercial astronauts or test pilots for private aerospace companies SpaceX, Blue Origin, and Virgin Galactic.

No.	Photograph	Name	Class Year	Degree	Notability	References
1		Keith Colmer	1996; 2001	M.S. in Aerospace Engineering; M.S. in Telecommunication Engineering	U.S. Air Force colonel and F-16 test pilot; piloted VSS Enterprise on the GF-21 suborbital test flight; later vice president at Gulfstream Aerospace	
2		Sarah Gillis	2017	B.S. in Aerospace Engineering	Mission Specialist on SpaceX Polaris Dawn; 1st commercial spacewalk; youngest person to perform a spacewalk; record for furthest woman from Earth (along with Anna Menon, until Artemis II)	
3		Laura Stiles	2011; 2013	M.S. and Ph.D. in Aerospace Engineering	Crew member on Blue Origin NS-38	
4		Luke Mays	2008	M.S. in Aerospace Engineering and Astrodynamics	Crew member on Virgin Galactic Unity 25; payload operations director at NASA; commercial astronaut instructor at Virgin Galactic	

== Affiliated astronauts ==
Four U.S. astronauts and one JAXA astronaut have been affiliated with CU Boulder as postdoctoral researchers or instructors.

No.	Photograph	Name	Affiliation with CU	Notability	References
1		George Nelson	Postdoctoral researcher (JILA)	Mission Specialist on STS-41-C, STS-61-C, and STS-26; postdoctoral researcher at the Joint Institute for Laboratory Astrophysics at CU Boulder	
2		Joseph Tanner	Senior instructor (Aerospace Engineering Sciences)	Mission Specialist on STS-66, STS-82, STS-97, and STS-115; performed two spacewalks to service the Hubble Space Telescope; instructor at CU Boulder	
3		Ed Lu	Postdoctoral researcher (JILA)	Mission Specialist on STS-84 and STS-106; flight engineer on Soyuz TMA-2 (Expedition 7); postdoctoral researcher at the High Altitude Observatory at CU Boulder	
4		Takao Doi	Postdoctoral researcher (Aerospace Engineering Sciences)	JAXA Mission Specialist on STS-87 and STS-123; 1st Japanese person to perform a spacewalk; postdoctoral researcher at the Center for Atmospheric Theory and Analysis at CU Boulder	
5		John Herrington	B.S. in Applied Mathematics (UCCS, 1983)	Mission Specialist on STS-113; 1st Native American astronaut; graduate of the University of Colorado at Colorado Springs	

== See also ==
- University of Colorado Boulder
- Ann and H.J. Smead Department of Aerospace Engineering Sciences
- NASA Astronaut Corps
