= Luke Mays =

American aerospace engineer (born 1974)

- Born: 1974 (age 51–52); El Paso, Texas, U.S.
- Occupation: Aerospace engineer

Academic background
- Education: University of Texas at El Paso (BS); University of Colorado, Boulder (MS)

Academic work
- Institutions: NASA; ESA; German Space Agency; Virgin Galactic
- Main interests: Human spaceflight
- Space career

Commercial Astronaut
- Time in space: 14 m
- Mission: Virgin Galactic Unity 25

Luke Rubin Mays (born 1974) is an American aerospace engineer and commercial astronaut. He was director of payload operations on the International Space Station (ISS) at NASA Marshall Space Flight Center from 2019 to 2023.

== Early life and education ==
Mays was born in El Paso, Texas in 1974. He attended the University of Texas at El Paso, where he studied mechanical engineering, graduating in 1997. After a decade, he earned a master's in aerospace engineering and astrodynamics at the University of Colorado, Boulder in 2008.

== Career ==
After graduating, Mays joined Lockheed Martin in 1997 as a flight controller and mission analyst for the Milstar satellite constellation. He worked at Schriever Air Force Base in Colorado Springs, supporting launch, early orbit, and on-orbit operations for the program.

In 2001, he moved to NASA Johnson Space Center (JSC) in Houston under the United Space Alliance as a manifest flight lead on the Space Shuttle program. He became an astronaut instructor on the Core Systems Crew Training (CSCT) Board for International Space Station (ISS) crew, including astronauts from NASA and JAXA and Russian cosmonauts, primarily on the (Environmental Control and Life Support System). Mays served as Increment Lead for Expedition 13 and as JAXA liaison for Flight 1J and Flight 13A during assembly of the International Space Station. He also conducted emergency training for Expedition 14 from the Christopher C. Kraft Jr. Mission Control Center and led astronaut training for American use of Soyuz until 2007.

In 2008, after earning a graduate degree, he relocated to the German Space Operations Center in Oberpfaffenhofen, Germany, supporting the European Space Agency’s Italian-built Colombus ISS module. He supported the program as training group lead under Telespazio VEGA Deutschland for two years. In 2009, he joined the German Aerospace Center (DLR) as flight director at the Columbus Control Center (Col-CC), Europe's control center for ISS operations in the Columbus module, until 2014.

Mays returned to NASA in 2017, serving as an ISS controller at Marshall Space Flight Center in Huntsville, Alabama. There, he directed operations of all ISS science payloads at the Payload Operations and Integration Center. In 2019, he was appointed NASA director of payload operations at NASA’s Marshall Space Flight Center, leading real-time scientific payload operations for more than a dozen expeditions to the station.

In 2023, Mays joined Virgin Galactic in Truth or Consequences, New Mexico as an astronaut instructor. Along with Beth Moses, Mays led training for the company's first commercial astronauts at Spaceport America. Since 2005, he is also vice chair of operations at the American Institute for Aeronautics and Astronautics (AIAA).

On May 25, 2023, Mays flew on Virgin Galactic Unity 25 as Astronaut 005 and mission specialist, reaching an apogee of 87.2 km (54.2 mi) for a flight duration of 14 minutes. He became the twentieth person from the University of Colorado to fly to space. The mission was piloted by CJ Sturckow and Mike Masucci and was the final test flight of SpaceShipTwo before the start of commercial service.

== Personal life ==
In 2005, Mays volunteered as a technical advisor to a team of high school students competing in the Mars Settlement Design Competition sponsored by AIAA.

== See also ==
- Beth Moses
- Virgin Galactic
- SpaceShipTwo
