= Yuri Kubo =

American electrical engineer

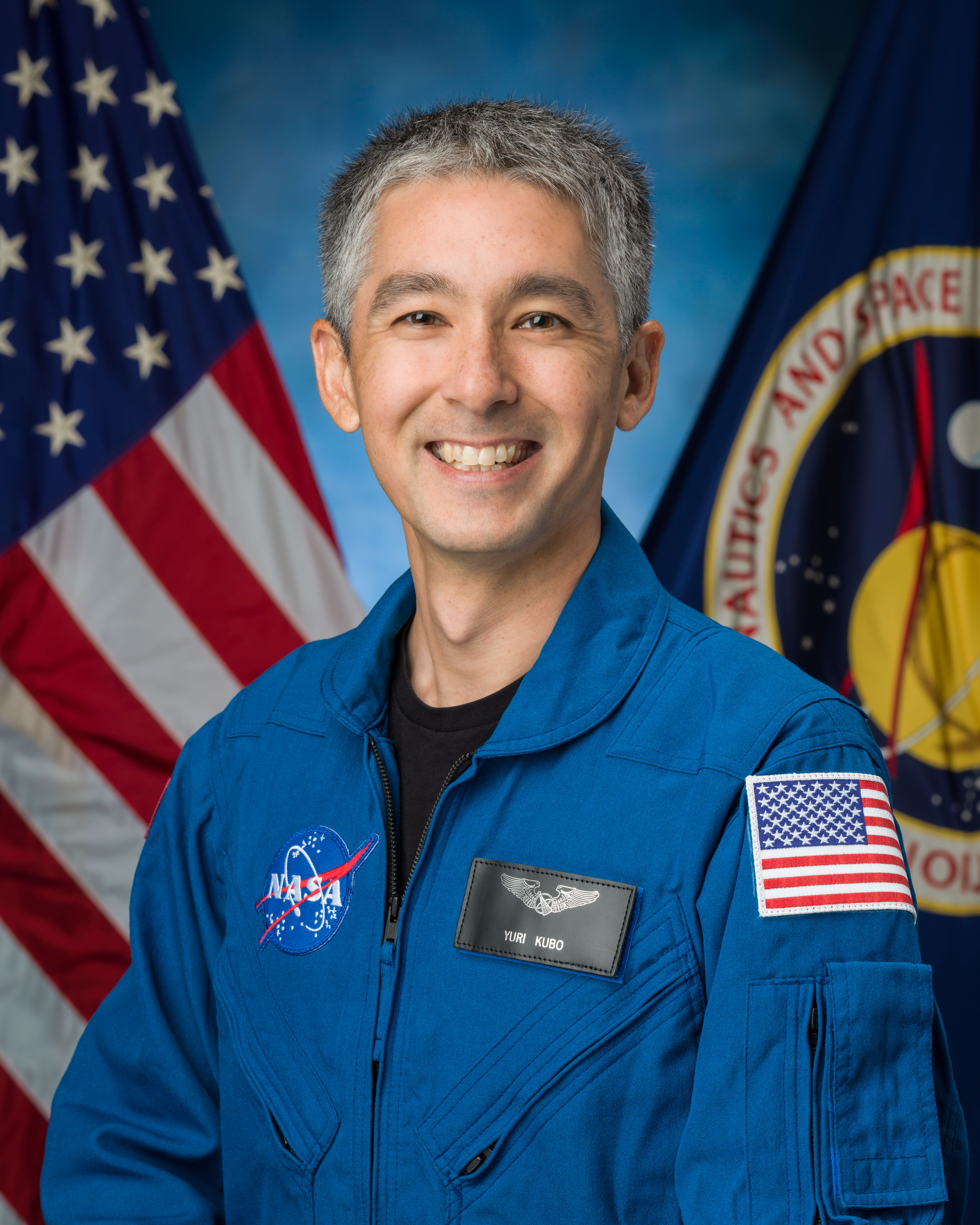
- Born: Columbus, Indiana, U.S.
- Education: Purdue University (BS, MS)
- Occupation: Electrical engineer
- Space career

NASA astronaut
- Status: Candidate
- Selection: NASA Group 24 (2025)

Yuri Kubo is an American electrical engineer, former SpaceX launch director, former engineering executive, and NASA astronaut candidate. He was selected by NASA in 2025 as a member of NASA Astronaut Group 24, the agency's 24th astronaut candidate class. At the time of his selection, Kubo was senior vice president of engineering at Electric Hydrogen.

== Early life and education ==
Kubo was born and raised in Columbus, Indiana. He graduated from the Indiana Academy for Science, Mathematics, and Humanities in 2004.

Kubo attended Purdue University in West Lafayette, Indiana, where he earned a bachelor's degree in electrical engineering in 2008 and a master's degree in electrical and computer engineering in 2015.

== Engineering career ==
Earlier in his career, Kubo was a co-op student and intern at NASA Johnson Space Center in Houston, where he completed multiple tours supporting the Orion spacecraft, the International Space Station in mission control, and the Space Shuttle program.

After graduating from Purdue, Kubo worked at SpaceX for 12 years across several engineering and operations teams. He began as a launch engineer at what is now Vandenberg Space Force Base, where he worked on data, controls, and low-voltage electrical infrastructure for SpaceX launch-site systems supporting the Falcon 9 rocket. He later served as a ground controller, automation lead, launch conductor, and launch director for Falcon 9 launches from Vandenberg.

Kubo later joined SpaceX's Starshield program, becoming director of avionics and overseeing teams involved in the design, launch, and operation of early Starshield satellites. He subsequently served as director of Ground Segment, a role involving SpaceX communication antennas used for the Dragon spacecraft, Falcon 9, Starship, and backup communications for Starlink satellites.

Before joining NASA's astronaut candidate corps, Kubo was senior vice president of engineering at Electric Hydrogen, a company that designs and manufactures electrolyzers. In that role, he oversaw teams working on plant design, testing, power systems, electrical design, controls, software, compliance, facilities, environmental health and safety, integration, service, and control-room operations.

== NASA career ==
NASA announced Kubo's selection as a member of the 2025 astronaut candidate class on September 22, 2025. The class included 10 candidates chosen from more than 8,000 applicants. He reported for duty at Johnson Space Center in September 2025 to begin approximately two years of initial astronaut training before becoming eligible for flight assignments.

In 2026, NASA reported that the 2025 astronaut candidate class had been nicknamed the "Platypi" by the preceding astronaut candidate class. During early training, the class studied International Space Station systems, orbital mechanics, flight operations, survival training, spacewalk training at the Neutral Buoyancy Laboratory, and flight training in NASA T-38 aircraft.

== Awards and honors ==
Kubo was named a 2024 recipient of Purdue University's College of Engineering "38 by 38" award, which recognizes young engineering alumni. His other honors include an Astronaut Scholarship Foundation award, the Charles C. Chappelle Fellowship, graduation with distinction from Purdue University, Purdue Electrical and Computer Engineering Outstanding Senior Awards, the SSACI Higher Education Award Honors, the Electrical Engineering General Scholarship, the Purdue University Academic Success Award, the Resident Top Scholar Award, the Albert Hubbard Melin Scholarship, and the Eta Kappa Nu Beta Chapter Scholarship.

== Personal life ==
Kubo is married and has two children. He played professional ultimate for the Indianapolis AlleyCats and has described sports, outdoor activities, and piano as personal interests.

== See also ==
- NASA Astronaut Group 24
- List of astronauts by year of selection
- List of Purdue University people
