= Rebecca Lawler =

American test pilot

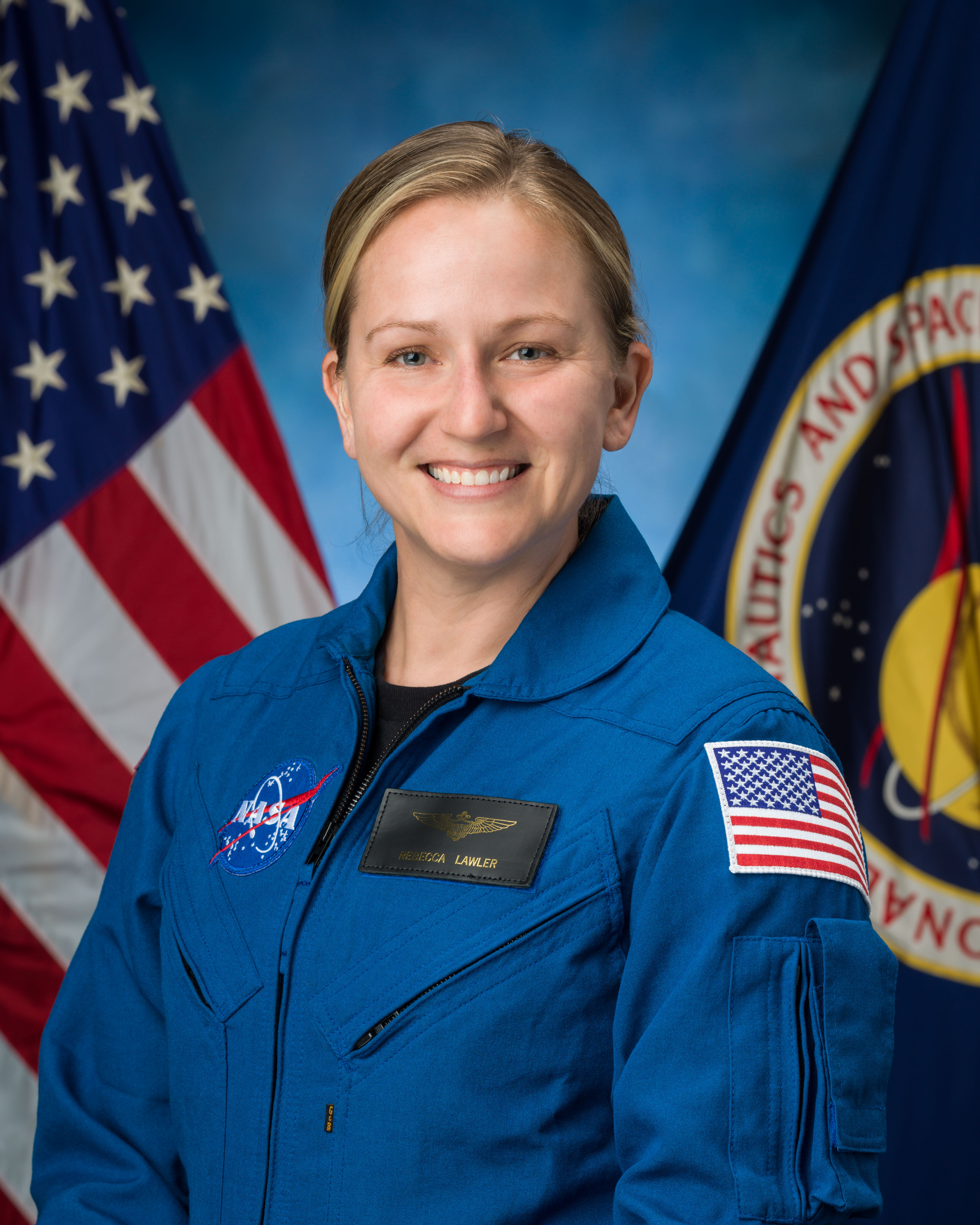
- Lawler in 2025
- Born: Lewisville, Texas, U.S.
- Education: United States Naval Academy (BS); Johns Hopkins University (MS); National Test Pilot School (MS)
- Space career

NASA astronaut
- Rank: Lieutenant commander
- Selection: NASA Group 24 (2025)

Rebecca "Becky" Lawler is an American test pilot, former United States Navy officer, former NOAA Commissioned Officer Corps officer, and NASA astronaut candidate. She was selected by NASA in 2025 as a member of NASA Astronaut Group 24, the agency's 24th astronaut candidate class. At the time of her selection, Lawler was a test pilot for United Airlines.

== Early life and education ==
Lawler was born in Lewisville, Texas, and considers Little Elm, Texas, to be her hometown. She graduated from Little Elm High School.

Lawler earned a bachelor's degree in mechanical engineering from the United States Naval Academy in 2009. In 2016, she graduated from the United States Naval Test Pilot School at Naval Air Station Patuxent River as a member of class 149. She earned a master's degree in space systems engineering from Johns Hopkins University in 2018 and a graduate certificate in engineering program management from the University of Colorado Boulder in 2019. She also holds a master's degree in flight test engineering from the National Test Pilot School.

== Career ==
=== United States Navy ===
Lawler served in the United States Navy for 11 years as a P-3C Orion pilot. During her Navy career, she deployed twice to the United States Sixth Fleet and accumulated more than 300 hours of combat flight time.

After graduating from the U.S. Naval Test Pilot School, Lawler served as a developmental test pilot and project officer with Air Test and Evaluation Squadron 20 (VX-20). In that role, she flew aircraft including the Northrop Grumman MQ-4C Triton, P-8A Poseidon, and C-38A Executive Courier. In 2019, she was selected as an aide to the Commander of Naval Air Systems Command, taught as an adjunct engineering professor at the College of Southern Maryland, and was promoted to lieutenant commander.

=== NOAA Corps and hurricane research ===
In 2020, Lawler transferred to the NOAA Commissioned Officer Corps, maintaining her rank of lieutenant commander. She served as a hurricane hunter and test pilot, flying the NOAA Lockheed WP-3D Orion and de Havilland Canada DHC-6 Twin Otter aircraft. During the 2020 and 2021 Atlantic hurricane seasons, she flew 32 hurricane eyewall penetrations and 11 tropical storm penetrations, and she supported other NOAA missions through 2022.

Lawler also supported NASA-related Earth science operations before joining the astronaut corps. In 2019, she flew as a P-3 Orion research pilot for Operation IceBridge over Greenland. In 2022, she led certification and testing for scientific instruments, serving as test director for a dual-aircraft certification flight of the minisonde launcher aboard NOAA's Gulfstream IV and NASA's Gulfstream V aircraft.

=== Civilian aviation ===
After leaving NOAA, Lawler taught flight test students at the Empire Test Pilots' School in Boscombe Down, England. She later became a flight test captain, or test pilot, for United Airlines, where she flew the Boeing 737, Boeing 787, and Airbus A320 family. Her role also included work on industry and regulatory updates related to communications, surveillance, and other developing aviation technologies.

By the time she was selected by NASA, Lawler had logged more than 2,800 flight hours in more than 45 different aircraft across military, general aviation, and commercial aviation.

== NASA career ==
NASA announced Lawler's selection as a member of its 2025 astronaut candidate class on September 22, 2025. The class consisted of 10 candidates selected from more than 8,000 applicants and was the first NASA astronaut candidate class to include more women than men.

Lawler reported for duty at Johnson Space Center in Houston in September 2025 to begin approximately two years of initial astronaut training before becoming eligible for flight assignments. During early training, members of the class studied spacecraft systems, spacewalk training in the Neutral Buoyancy Laboratory, flight training in T-38 aircraft, robotics, geology, and survival training.

In 2026, the 2025 astronaut candidate class was nicknamed the "Platypi" by the preceding NASA astronaut candidate class.

== Awards and honors ==
Lawler's honors include the Department of Commerce Gold Medal in 2022, the National Response Deployment Medal in 2022, the NOAA Corps Achievement Medal in 2021, the Navy and Marine Corps Commendation Medal, the Navy and Marine Corps Achievement Medal, the Navy Sea Service Deployment Medal, the Global War on Terrorism Service Medal, and the U.S. Naval Academy Leadership Excellence Award for Plebe Summer Detail.

== Organizations ==
Lawler is a member of the Society of Experimental Test Pilots.

== Personal life ==
Lawler is married and has one child. Her interests include running, painting, reading, and spending time with her family.

== See also ==
- NASA Astronaut Group 24
- List of astronauts by year of selection
- List of United States Naval Academy alumni
- List of Johns Hopkins University people
