= Ann and H.J. Smead Department of Aerospace Engineering Sciences =

Department at UC Boulder

- Type: Public
- Established: 1946
- Chairperson: Brian Argrow
- Academic staff: 56
- Undergraduates: 992
- Postgraduates: 468
- Location: Boulder, Colorado, U.S. 40°0′36″N 105°14′38″W
- Website: http://www.colorado.edu/aerospace

The Ann and H.J. Smead Department of Aerospace Engineering Sciences is a department within the College of Engineering & Applied Science at the University of Colorado Boulder, providing aerospace education and research. Housed primarily in the Aerospace Engineering Sciences building on the university's East Campus in Boulder, it awards baccalaureate, masters, and PhD degrees, as well as certificates, graduating approximately 225 students annually. The Ann and H.J. Smead Department of Aerospace Engineering Sciences is ranked 8th in the nation in both undergraduate and graduate aerospace engineering education among public universities by US News & World Report.

== History ==
Aerospace engineering at the University of Colorado Boulder initially began as an option within the university’s mechanical engineering program in 1930. In 1946, it was split off and became the Department of Aeronautical Engineering under the leadership of aerospace education pioneer Karl Dawson Wood, who served as its first chair. It was renamed the Department of Aerospace Engineering Sciences in 1963.

Both the State of Colorado and the department grew as aerospace research centers during the space race. 1948. The Laboratory for Atmospheric and Space Physics was founded on campus as the Upper Air Laboratory, followed a few years later by Ball Aerospace Corporation, which opened a research facility in Boulder that eventually became their headquarters, and Lockheed Martin Space Systems, which established a strategic plant in nearby southwest Denver in 1955.

The later addition of numerous federal research labs to the Boulder landscape, including the National Institute of Standards and Technology (NIST), National Oceanic and Atmospheric Administration, National Center for Atmospheric Research, and in Golden, the National Renewable Energy Laboratory, further expanded the area’s research center.

Today, Boulder and the surrounding Denver Metro are home to operations for large aerospace corporations and small startups.

In 2017, the department was renamed the Ann and H.J. Smead Department of Aerospace Engineering Sciences in recognition of former Kaiser Aerospace & Electronics Corp CEO, Harold “Joe” Smead, and his widow Ann Smead, in recognition of their significant contributions to the department. Later the same year ground was broken on a 175,000 square-foot, $101 million aerospace building, which opened in 2019.

The department now conducts a wide range of research across aeronautical and astronautical science and engineering, as well as in Earth and space sciences. Much of the department’s research cuts across these focus areas including astrodynamics, autonomous systems, bioastronautics, and remote sensing.

== Facilities ==
- Aerospace Mechanics Research Center - Dedicated to the development of next-generation aerospace structures and systems. Known for expertise in multiphysics modeling and optimization of structural systems.
- Autonomous Vehicle Systems lab - Researching spacecraft dynamics, formation flying, and orbital debris removal utilizing electrostatic force fields.
- Bioastronautics Laboratories - Low and high bay facilities housing a human centrifuge, Dream Chaser cabin mock-up, thermal vacuum chamber, and other human spacecraft mock-ups.
- BioServe Space Technologies – Originally founded through a NASA grant in 1987, designs, builds, and operates life science research and hardware for microgravity environments. Facilities include a payload operations center for conducting live uplinks with orbiting astronauts.
- Colorado Center for Astrodynamics Research – Conducts astrodynamics, space weather, and remote sensing research. Is the largest center in the department, by number of faculty and students.
- Experimental Aerodynamics Laboratory (EAL) – Housed in a dedicated research building adjacent to the Department’s Aerospace Engineering Sciences Building and containing a low-speed wind tunnel, the EAL is devoted to improving production, understanding, and control of complex flow fields in aerodynamic applications.
- Research and Engineering Center for Unmanned Vehicles (RECUV) – Research center for development and execution of scientific and commercial experiments for mitigation of natural disasters and national defense utilizing aerial, ground-based, and submersible unmanned vehicles. Part of the multi-university TORUS project partnership.
- UAV Fabrication Lab - Dedicated to the design and construction of unmanned aerial vehicles and scientific instruments carried by them.
- Woods / Composites and Metal Machine Shops - Containing four-axis CNC milling machines and lathes, water jets, welding equipment, metal and plastic 3D printers, composite ovens, and indoor hazardous materials test cell.

== Notable people ==
- George Born - Pioneering aerospace researcher and professor who founded the Colorado Center for Astrodynamics Research.
- Adolf Busemann - Former professor, designer of the swept-wing aircraft
- Steve Chappell - aerospace engineer and NASA scientist. Member of the NASA Extreme Environment Mission Operations 14 (NEEMO 14) aquanaut crew
- Charbel Farhat - Former professor, current chair of Stanford University's Department of Aeronautics and Astronautics.
- Moriba Jah - astrodynamicist, professor at the University of Texas-Austin, and former spacecraft navigator for NASA's Jet Propulsion Laboratory.
- Steve Jolly – Director and chief engineer of commercial civil space at Lockheed Martin Space Systems.
- Mark Sirangelo - Current faculty member and former Executive Vice President of Sierra Nevada Space Systems
- Michael T. Voorhees - Entrepreneur, engineer, designer, geographer, and aeronaut
- Karl Dawson Wood – Aerospace education pioneer and department founder.

== Current Faculty Members of the National Academies ==
- Brian Argrow
- Penina Axelrad
- Daniel Baker
- Kristine Larson
- David Marshall
- Daniel Scheeres

== CU Boulder-Affiliated Astronauts ==
- Loren Acton, NASA astronaut
- Patrick Baudry, CNES astronaut
- Vance D. Brand, NASA astronaut
- Scott Carpenter, NASA astronaut in second orbital flight of Project Mercury
- Kalpana Chawla, NASA astronaut, died on Columbia
- Takao Doi, NASA astronaut
- Samuel T. Durrance, NASA astronaut
- Richard Hieb, NASA astronaut, current professor
- Marsha Ivins, NASA astronaut
- John M. Lounge, NASA astronaut
- George Nelson, NASA astronaut
- Ellison Onizuka, NASA astronaut, died on Challenger in January 1986
- Stuart Roosa, NASA astronaut, flew on Apollo 14
- Ronald M. Sega, NASA astronaut
- Steven Swanson, NASA astronaut
- Jack Swigert, NASA astronaut, flew on Apollo 13
- Joe Tanner, NASA astronaut, retired professor
- James Voss, NASA astronaut, current professor
