= Imelda Muller =

American astronaut candidate, physician, and former naval officer

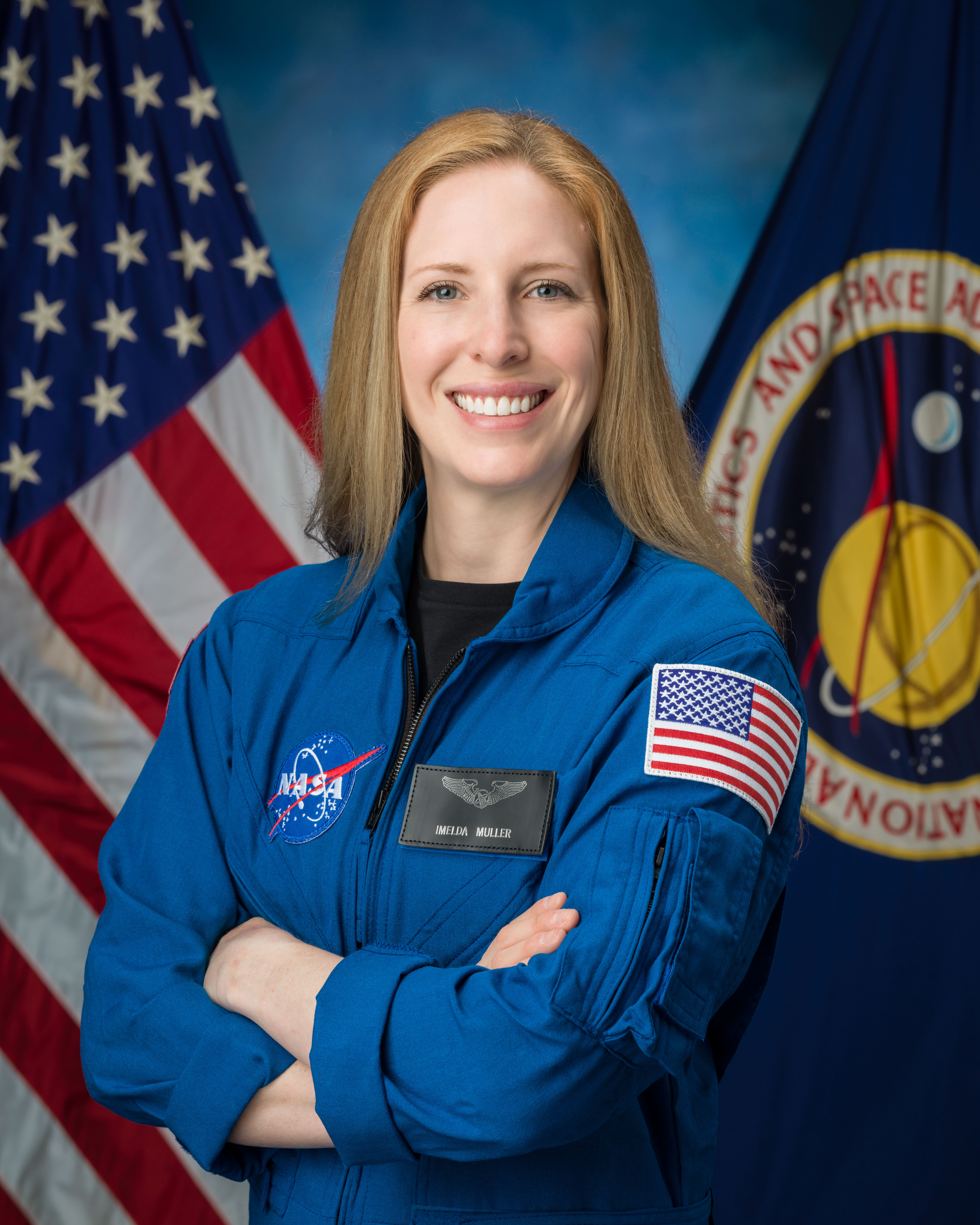
- Born: Mineola, New York, U.S.
- Education: Northeastern University (BS); University of Vermont College of Medicine (MD)
- Occupations: Physician, naval officer
- Space career
- Status: Astronaut candidate
- Selection: NASA Astronaut Group 24 (2025)

Imelda Muller is an American physician, former United States Navy officer, and NASA astronaut candidate. She was selected in 2025 as a member of NASA Astronaut Group 24, NASA's 24th astronaut candidate class. She reported for duty in September 2025 to begin two years of astronaut candidate training.

== Early life and education ==
Muller was born in Mineola, New York, and considers Copake Falls, New York, her hometown. She graduated from Taconic Hills High School in New York.

She earned a bachelor's degree in behavioral neuroscience from Northeastern University and received a medical degree from the University of Vermont College of Medicine in 2017. She completed a transitional-year residency internship at Naval Medical Center San Diego in 2018 and an anesthesia residency at the Johns Hopkins School of Medicine in 2025.

== Military and medical career ==
After completing her transitional-year internship, Muller was selected as transitional-year academic chief resident at Naval Medical Center San Diego. In 2019, she completed undersea medical officer training at the Naval Undersea Medical Institute in Groton, Connecticut.

Muller served as an undersea medical officer in the U.S. Navy and worked with the U.S. Navy Experimental Diving Unit in Panama City Beach, Florida. There, she served as deputy Medical Department head and chair of the Institutional Review Board, supporting human performance testing, diving health initiatives, decompression safety, physiological resilience, and medical support for saturation diving operations. She also provided medical support during Navy operational diving training at NASA's Neutral Buoyancy Laboratory at Johnson Space Center in Houston.

== NASA career ==
NASA announced Muller as one of ten members of its 2025 astronaut candidate class on September 22, 2025. The class was selected from a pool of more than 8,000 applicants. Muller began astronaut candidate training in September 2025, a program intended to prepare candidates for possible future flight assignments to low Earth orbit, the Moon, and Mars.

== Awards and honors ==
Muller's honors include the Department of the Navy's Dr. Delores M. Etter Top Scientists and Engineers of the Year Award, the Johns Hopkins Resident Teaching Award, two Navy and Marine Corps Commendation Medals, the Commander Wayne Horn Honorman Award from the Naval Undersea Medical Institute, the Global Health Reflections Award from the University of Vermont College of Medicine, and recognition as class marshal at Northeastern University.

== Personal life ==
NASA lists Muller's personal interests as hiking, endurance sports, scuba diving, and home renovation projects. While on active duty, she competed as an elite triathlete on the U.S. Military Endurance Sports team and was a member of the All-Navy Triathlon team in 2022.

== See also ==
- NASA Astronaut Group 24
- NASA Astronaut Corps
- Space medicine
- Neutral Buoyancy Laboratory
