= Katherine Spies =

Astronaut candidate

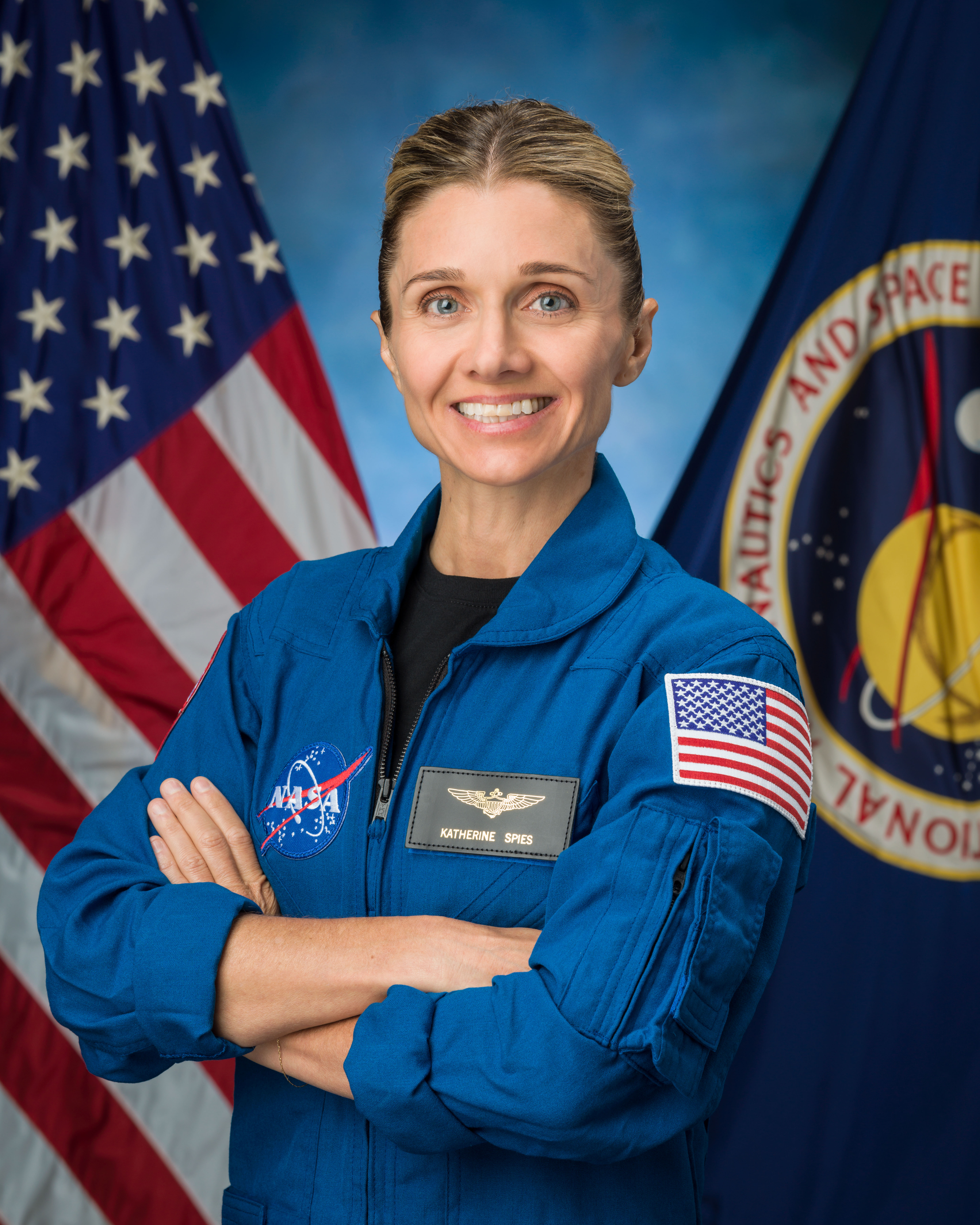
- Spies in 2025
- Born: Mission Viejo, California, U.S.
- Education: University of Southern California (BS); Harvard University (MS)
- Space career

NASA astronaut
- Status: Candidate
- Rank: Lieutenant colonel, United States Marine Corps Reserve
- Selection: NASA Group 24 (2025)

Katherine Spies is an American engineer, United States Marine Corps aviator, test pilot, and NASA astronaut candidate. She was selected by NASA in 2025 as a member of NASA Astronaut Group 24, the agency's 24th astronaut candidate class. At the time of her selection, Spies was director of flight test engineering at Gulfstream Aerospace.

== Early life and education ==
Spies was born in Mission Viejo, California, and considers San Diego to be her hometown. She graduated from James W. Robinson Jr. Secondary School in Fairfax, Virginia.

Spies earned a bachelor's degree in chemical engineering from the University of Southern California in 2004. She graduated from the United States Naval Test Pilot School at Naval Air Station Patuxent River in 2012. In 2019, she earned a master's degree in design engineering from Harvard University, through a joint program of the Harvard Graduate School of Design and the Harvard John A. Paulson School of Engineering and Applied Sciences.

== Military career ==
Spies was commissioned as a second lieutenant in the United States Marine Corps in 2004 after graduating from USC. She completed The Basic School at Marine Corps Base Quantico in Virginia and flight training in Pensacola, Florida, earning her Naval Aviator wings in 2006. She trained as an AH-1W Super Cobra pilot with Marine Light Attack Helicopter Training Squadron 303 before beginning operational service with Marine Light Attack Helicopter Squadron 267 at Marine Corps Base Camp Pendleton in California.

After being promoted to captain in 2008, Spies deployed with the 15th Marine Expeditionary Unit aboard USS Peleliu (LHA-5), supporting operations in regions that included the Middle East. She later served with the 31st Marine Expeditionary Unit in Asia and the Pacific and was assigned in 2011 to I Marine Expeditionary Force (Forward).

In 2012, Spies was selected for the United States Naval Test Pilot School. After graduation, she was assigned to Air Test and Evaluation Squadron 21 as the UH-1Y/AH-1Z project officer and AH-1W platform coordinator. By the time of her NASA selection, she had accumulated more than 2,000 flight hours in more than 30 aircraft, including more than 300 combat flight hours.

Spies continued to serve in the United States Marine Corps Reserve as a lieutenant colonel after leaving active duty. In 2026, the Marine Corps reported that she was serving with Headquarters Battalion, 4th Marine Aircraft Wing, as a liaison officer.

== Civilian aviation and engineering career ==
After her active-duty Marine Corps service, Spies joined Amazon Prime Air, where she worked as a developmental flight test and engineering leader on autonomous drone delivery systems. She later worked at Gulfstream Aerospace as director of flight test engineering, leading certification and flight test programs for the Gulfstream G700 and Gulfstream G800 aircraft. Harvard described her work before NASA as spanning Marine Corps attack helicopter aviation and flight test engineering leadership in high-pressure technical environments.

== NASA career ==
NASA announced Spies' selection as a member of its 2025 astronaut candidate class on September 22, 2025. The class consisted of 10 candidates selected from more than 8,000 applicants. Spies reported for duty in September 2025 at Johnson Space Center in Houston to begin approximately two years of initial astronaut training before becoming eligible for flight assignments.

As part of the 2025 astronaut candidate class, Spies' training included subjects such as spacecraft systems, robotics, foreign language training, flight training, survival training, and extravehicular activity preparation. NASA has described the class as part of preparations for future missions to the International Space Station, the Moon, and Mars.

== Awards and honors ==
Spies' academic honors include the Ronald G. Minet Award for Best Design Project and the Charles J. Rebert Chemical Engineering Outstanding Service Award at the University of Southern California, top-five-percent recognition at Officer Candidate School, the Commodore's Award for Academic Achievement during flight school, and selection as a Harvard Graduate School Leadership Initiative Fellow.

Her military awards include the Air Medal with four subsequent awards, the Navy and Marine Corps Commendation Medal, the Navy and Marine Corps Achievement Medal, the Afghanistan Campaign Medal with two campaign stars, the NATO Medal for service in Afghanistan, the Sea Service Deployment Ribbon, and multiple unit commendations.

== Organizations ==
Spies is a member of the Society of Experimental Test Pilots, the Society of Flight Test Engineers, Socrates at the Aspen Institute, and the Professional Ski Instructors of America.

== Personal life ==
Spies is an avid runner and backcountry skier, and she has described painting and travel among her interests. Before joining NASA, she completed a year of solo travel through the Balkans, Southwest China, Southeast Asia, and the Arctic Circle, and later worked as an alpine ski instructor in Utah.

== See also ==
- NASA Astronaut Group 24
- List of astronauts by year of selection
- List of United States Naval Academy alumni
- List of University of Southern California people
- List of Harvard University people
