= Erin Overcash =

American aerospace engineer (born 1986)

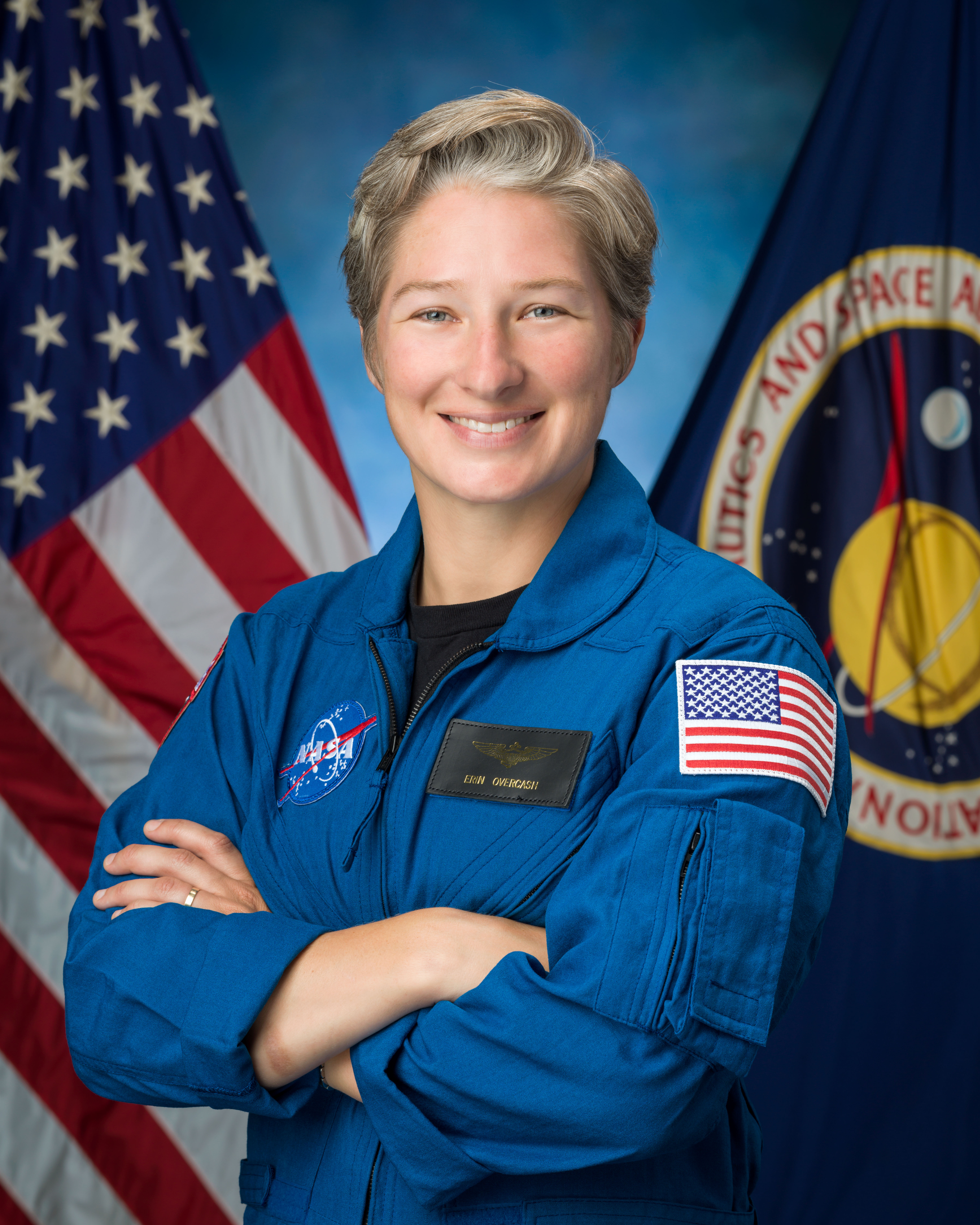
- Portrait in 2025
- Born: Erin Roxie Overcash; November 29, 1990 (age 35); Louisville, Kentucky, U.S.
- Education: University of Colorado, Boulder (BS, MS)
- Space career

NASA astronaut candidate
- Selection: NASA Group 24 (2025)
- Military career
- Branch: United States Navy
- Years: 2017–2025
- Rank: Lieutenant Commander
- Unit: Strike Fighter Squadron 102

Rugby union career
International career
| Years | Team | Apps | (Points) |
| 2013 | United States | 3 | (0) |

Erin Roxie Overcash (born November 29, 1990) is an American aerospace engineer, Navy test pilot, and astronaut candidate in NASA Astronaut Group 24. She is also a former rugby union player who represented the United States in international competition.

== Early life and education ==
Overcash was born in Louisville, Kentucky in 1990. She attended North Oldham High School in Goshen, Kentucky and became the Kentucky State Champion at high jump twice. She studied aerospace engineering at the University of Colorado, Boulder, graduating with a bachelor's in 2014 and a master's in bioastronautics and engineering entrepreneurship in 2017.

After graduation, she commissioned into the U.S. Navy as an operational pilot of the Boeing F/A-18E/F Super Hornet with Strike Fighter Squadron 102. She was stationed at Marine Corps Air Station Iwakuni in Japan and served multiple deployments in the Pacific and Middle East until 2022.

Overcash attended the United States Naval Test Pilot School at Naval Air Station Patuxent River in Maryland, graduating with Class 162 in 2023. Afterwards, she served as an F/A-18E, F/A-18F, and Boeing EA-18G Growler test pilot and accrued more than 1,300 flight hours in 20 different aircraft, including 249 landings on naval aircraft carriers. Her call sign is "Loft". In 2024, she was also a Service Chief Fellow at DARPA.

While training for an operational tour as squadron department head of the F/A-18E at Naval Air Station Oceana in Virginia, she was selected for the NASA Astronaut Corps along with nine others in Group 24. She is the sixteenth person and third woman to be selected from the University of Colorado Boulder. She reported for duty at Johnson Space Center in Houston in September 2025, where she will complete two years of astronaut training for expeditions to the International Space Station.

She is a member of the Society of Experimental Test Pilots, the Ninety-Nines, and Women Military Aviators.

== Awards ==
- Naval Test Wing Atlantic Test Pilot of the Year (2024)
- U.S. Navy Commendation Medal (2023)

== Personal life ==
Overcash is married to another naval aviator. She played rugby union in multiple positions for the Berkeley All Blues and earned three caps with the United States national team beginning in 2013. She was considered for the 2016 Olympics sevens roster but was not selected. Overcash also competes in Ironman Triathlon events.

== See also ==
- NASA Astronaut Group 24
- International Space Station
- List of astronauts educated at the University of Colorado Boulder
