= Karl Dawson Wood =

American aerospace engineer (1898-1995)

K.D. Wood
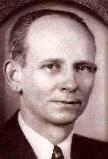
- Born: Karl Dawson Wood; September 27, 1898; Forest Glen, Maryland
- Died: April 19, 1995 (aged 96)
- Education: ME Cornell University 1922; MS Cornell University 1926; University of Michigan

Karl Dawson (K.D.) Wood (September 27, 1898 – April 19, 1995) was an aerospace education pioneer specializing in airplane and spacecraft design. His first two books, Airplane Design and Technical Aerodynamics, with over ten editions, were the standard college textbooks for generations of aerospace engineers. Additionally, he was the technical editor for Prentice-Hall as well as other textbooks and publications in applied aeronautics, thermodynamics and guided missiles. Wood's textbooks contained practical knowledge derived from his summertime contract jobs at Air Materiel Command, General Motors, National Bureau of Standards, Marquardt Corporation, Douglas Aircraft, Grumman Aircraft, Martin Company, National Science Foundation, Consolidated Aircraft, Bell Aircraft Company, and Consolidated-Vultee.

He earned an M.E. Degree from Cornell University in 1922, a M.S. from Cornell in 1926, and a Ph.D. from the University of Michigan in 1955. He started the aeronautical engineering departments at Purdue University and University of Colorado.
