= NASA Astronaut Group 24 =

2025 human spaceflight selection of 10 candidates; "The Platypi"

The Platypi
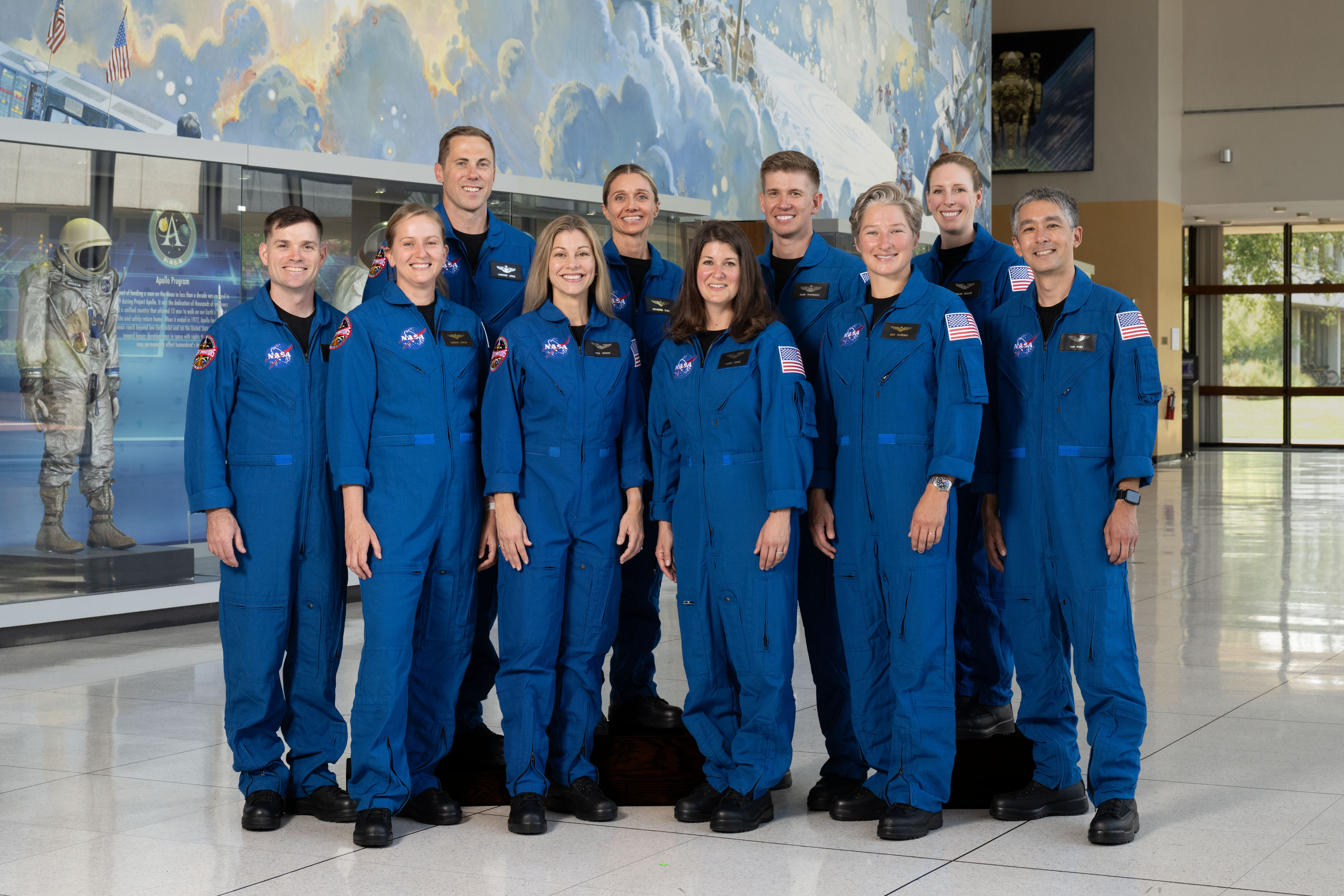
- NASA Astronaut Group 24 in 2025. From left to right: Bailey, Lawler, Jones, Menon, Spies, Edgar, Fuhrmann, Overcash, Muller, and Kubo.
- Year selected: 2025
- Number selected: 10

The selection of NASA Astronaut Group 24 (nicknamed "The Platypi") was announced on March 5, 2024, alongside the graduation of the previous NASA astronaut class, NASA Astronaut Group 23. The group was announced on September 22, 2025.

== History ==
NASA announced the creation of this astronaut group in March of 2024, and accepted applications for astronaut hires through April 16, 2024. On August 23, 2025, NASA released a statement that the new class would be announced at Johnson Space Center on September 22, 2025, and the event was subsequently live-streamed on that day.

The class nickname, the Platypi, was announced in March 2026. The prior astronaut class chose the name saying that the platypus was a fitting symbol of the group's range of skills and personalities.

== Group members ==
External videos
- Astronaut Class of 2025 Official Announcement September 22, 2025

- Ben Bailey: U.S. Army chief warrant officer, experimental test pilot, and engineer
- Lauren Edgar: former United States Geological Survey geologist
- Adam Fuhrmann: U.S. Air Force Major
- Cameron Jones: U.S. Air Force Major
- Yuri Kubo: former SpaceX engineer, former SVP of Engineering at Electric Hydrogen
- Rebecca Lawler: NOAA Corps Lieutenant Commander (ret.), former US Navy pilot, former United Airlines test pilot
- Anna Menon: former SpaceX engineer; previously flew on Polaris Dawn spaceflight
- Imelda Muller: U.S. Navy Lieutenant (ret.), undersea medical officer
- Erin Overcash: U.S. Navy Lieutenant Commander
- Katherine Spies: U.S. Marine Corps (ret.), former director of flight test engineering at Gulfstream Aerospace

== See also ==
- 2022 European Space Agency Astronaut Group
- List of astronauts by year of selection
