= Michael T. Voorhees =

Michael T. Voorhees (born April 16, 1967, in Fort Carson, Colorado) is an American entrepreneur, engineer, designer, geographer, and aeronaut focusing on the need for sustainability in technology, business, and societal choices. He is the founding CEO of Skylite Aeronautics and Chief Designer of the Skylite 500 GeoShip, a modern rigid airship being developed for passenger, cargo, and humanitarian transportation purposes.

== Notable achievements ==
On March 2, 2009, Voorhees was named as a finalist in the 2009 Buckminster Fuller Challenge. The Buckminster Fuller Institute's annual prize program calls for design strategies which “present a bold, visionary, tangible initiative that is focused on a well-defined need of critical importance. They should be regionally specific yet globally applicable, and backed up by a solid plan and the capability to move the solution forward.”

In 2009, Voorhees was named as a delegate to the inaugural Global Forum on Sustainable Enterprise, which was convened in New York City by the Center for Sustainable Global Enterprise at the Johnson Graduate School of Management at Cornell University.

== Sustainability endeavors ==
Voorhees has worked in numerous areas of sustainability, including environmental impact analysis, authoring a study on “The True Costs of the Automobile to Society” for the Boulder, Colorado Department of Alternative Transportation. In 1994, he received a patent for a gray water processing system designed for residential water conservation. At BioServe Space Technologies, a NASA Center at the University of Colorado, Boulder, his research focused on bioregenerative life support systems (also known as Controlled Ecological Life Support Systems) where he served as principal investigator on seven Space Shuttle experiments which were flown onboard missions STS-50, STS-54, STS-57, STS-60, and STS-62.

He has given presentations of his work on sustainable lighter-than-air transportation to such organizations as the American Institute of Aeronautics and Astronautics, the World Bank, the Bioneers, the University of Michigan Ross School of Business, Cornell University Johnson School of Management, and the Anderson-Abruzzo Albuquerque International Balloon Museum. On February 22, 2011, Mr. Voorhees was issued a patent for a propulsion and maneuvering system for buoyant aircraft that eliminates the need for tail fins and allows for low speed maneuver without the requirement for ground crew. Another patent was issued to Mr. Voorhees on January 10, 2012, for an Aerostatic Buoyancy Control System that enables airships and other craft to pneumatically control their altitude without conventional ballast or the venting of lifting-gas.

== Ballooning ==
Voorhees is also a hot air balloon pilot with a commercial pilot certificate and flight instructor privileges, who has participated in numerous balloon rallies throughout the southwestern United States. He led the development of a computerized balloon flight simulator that debuted at the 2000 Albuquerque International Balloon Fiesta, portions of which are now featured on the Balloon Federation of America's web site.

== Education ==
Voorhees earned a B.A. degree in Geography and an M.E. degree in Aerospace Engineering Sciences, both from the University of Colorado at Boulder. He also graduated in 1985 from Punahou School, a private college preparatory school in Honolulu, Hawaii, during which his attendance partly overlapped that of fellow student Barack Obama.

== Awards ==
Mike Voorhees was presented the FBI Director's Award for "Exceptional Service in the Public Interest" for his work protecting and improving the security posture of critical infrastructure in New Mexico as President of InfraGard New Mexico. He is the recipient of an Outstanding Student Award in 1993 from the American Society of Gravitational and Space Biology (ASGSB) for his presentation “Microgravitationally and thermally induced metabolic acceleration in the miniature wasp Spalangia endius.” In 1985, Voorhees attained the rank of Eagle Scout in the Boy Scouts of America and is a Life Member of the National Eagle Scout Association.
