= List of astronauts by year of selection =

This is a list of astronauts by year of selection: people selected to train for a human spaceflight program to command, pilot, or serve as a crew member of a spacecraft. Until recently, astronauts were sponsored and trained exclusively by governments, either by the military or by civilian space agencies. However, with the advent of suborbital flight starting with privately funded SpaceShipOne in 2004, a new category of astronaut was created: the commercial astronaut.

While the term astronaut is sometimes applied to anyone who trains for travels into space—including scientists, politicians, journalists, and tourists—this article lists only professional astronauts, those who have been selected to train as a profession. This includes national space programs and private industry programs which train and/or hire their own professional astronauts.

More than 500 people have trained as astronauts. A list of everyone who has flown in space can be found at List of space travelers by name.

== X-15 pilot group (USA) ==
Fourteen pilots were directly involved with the X-15, although only twelve actually flew the vehicles. There was no formal selection process, since everyone chosen was already a qualified test pilot.

Scott Crossfield and Alvin White were the prime and backup North American Aviation test pilots who first became involved with the project. Air Force Captains Iven Kincheloe (prime pilot) and Robert White (backup) were assigned to the X-15 in 1957. When Kincheloe was killed in an accident through a different rocket aircraft program, White became prime pilot and Captain Robert Rushworth became his backup. The first NASA pilots were Joseph Walker and Neil Armstrong. Lieutenant Commander Forrest S. Petersen represented the Navy.

Walker and Armstrong were eventually replaced by NASA pilots John B. McKay (1960), Milton Thompson (1963) and William H. Dana (1965). White and Rushworth were succeeded by Captain Joe Engle (1963), Captain William Joseph Knight (1964) and Major Michael Adams (1966). The Navy selected Lieutenant Lloyd Hoover (1924–2016) as Peterson's replacement, though he never trained or flew.

The last surviving member of this group was Joe Engle; he died in 2024.

== 1958 ==
June 25 – Man in Space Soonest (USA)

Neil Armstrong, William B. Bridgeman, Albert S. Crossfield, Iven C. Kincheloe, John B. McKay, Robert A. Rushworth, Joseph A. Walker, Alvin S. White, and Robert M. White.

Nine test pilots from the National Advisory Committee for Aeronautics (NACA), the United States Air Force (USAF), North American Aviation (NAA), and Douglas Aircraft Corporation were selected for the Man in Space Soonest project, a USAF initiative to put a man in space before the Soviet Union did. The project was cancelled on August 1, but two of these men would later reach space: Walker made two X-15 flights above 100 kilometers in 1963; and Neil Armstrong joined NASA in 1962 and flew in Project Gemini and Apollo, becoming the first human to set foot on the Moon at 02:56 UTC July 21, 1969.

The last surviving member of this group was Neil Armstrong; he died in 2012.

== 1959 ==
April 9 – NASA Group 1 – Mercury Seven (USA)

Scott Carpenter, Gordon Cooper, John Glenn, Gus Grissom, Wally Schirra, Alan Shepard and Deke Slayton.

The first group of astronauts selected by NASA were for Project Mercury in April 1959. All seven were military test pilots, a requirement specified by President Eisenhower to simplify the selection process. All seven eventually flew in space, although one, Deke Slayton, did not fly a Mercury mission due to a medical disqualification, instead flying a decade later on the Apollo–Soyuz mission. The other six each flew one Mercury mission. For two of these, Scott Carpenter and John Glenn, the Mercury mission was their only flight in the Mercury/Gemini/Apollo era. Glenn later flew on the Space Shuttle.

Three of the Mercury astronauts, Gus Grissom, Gordon Cooper and Wally Schirra, also each flew a mission during the Gemini program. Alan Shepard was slated to fly Mercury 10 before its cancellation and was the original commander for the Gemini 3 mission, but did not fly due to a medical disqualification. After surgery to correct the problem, he later flew as commander of Apollo 14. He was the only Mercury astronaut to go to the Moon.

Wally Schirra was the only astronaut to fly into space on all three types of spacecraft, though Gus Grissom was scheduled to be first to complete that feat before he died in a fire on Apollo 1 during launchpad training. Gordon Cooper was a backup commander for Apollo 10, the "dress rehearsal" flight for the lunar landing, and would have commanded another mission—likely to have been Apollo 13, according to the crew rotation—but was bumped from the rotation after a disagreement with NASA management.

Collectively, at least one member of the Mercury Seven flew on every NASA class of human-rated spacecraft (but neither the Skylab nor ISS space stations) through the end of the 20th century: Mercury, Gemini, Apollo, and the Space Shuttle.

The last surviving member of this group was John Glenn; he died in 2016.

== 1960 ==
March 7 – Air Force Group 1 (USSR)

ru:Первый отряд космонавтов СССР

Ivan Anikeyev, Pavel Belyayev, Valentin Bondarenko, Valery Bykovsky, Valentin Filatyev, Yuri Gagarin, Viktor Gorbatko, Anatoli Kartashov, Yevgeny Khrunov, Vladimir Komarov, Alexei Leonov, Grigori Nelyubov, Andrian Nikolayev, Pavel Popovich, Mars Rafikov, Georgi Shonin, Gherman Titov, Valentin Varlamov, Boris Volynov, and Dmitri Zaikin.

The initial group of Soviet cosmonauts was chosen from Soviet Air Force jet pilots.

As of 2026, the only surviving member is Boris Volynov.

April – Dyna–Soar Group 1 (USA)

Neil Armstrong, William H. Dana, Henry C. Gordon, Pete Knight, Russell L. Rogers, Milt Thompson, and James W. Wood.

In April 1960, seven men were secretly chosen for the Dyna-Soar program. Armstrong had previously been part of the MISS program. Armstrong and Dana left the program in the summer of 1962.

The last surviving member of this group was William H. Dana; he died in 2014.

== 1962 ==
March 12 – Female Group (USSR)

ru:Женская группа космонавтов ВВС (1962)

Tatyana Kuznetsova, Valentina Ponomaryova, Irina Solovyova, Valentina Tereshkova, and Zhanna Yorkina.

On March 12, 1962, a group of five civilian women with parachuting experience was added to the cosmonaut training program. Only Tereshkova would fly. A leading Soviet high-altitude parachutist, 20-year-old Tatyana Kuznetsova was, and remains, the youngest person ever selected to train for spaceflight.

September 17 – NASA Group 2 – The Next Nine, aka The Nifty Nine, The New Nine (USA)

Neil Armstrong, Frank Borman, Pete Conrad, Jim Lovell, Jim McDivitt, Elliot See, Tom Stafford, Ed White, and John Young.

A second group of nine astronauts was selected by NASA in September 1962. All of this group flew missions in the Gemini program except Elliot See, who died in a flight accident while preparing for the Gemini 9 flight. All of the others also flew on Apollo, except for Ed White, who died in the Apollo 1 launchpad fire.

Three of this group, McDivitt, Borman and Armstrong, made single flights in both Gemini and Apollo. Four others, Young, Lovell, Stafford and Conrad, each made two flights in Gemini and at least one flight in Apollo. Young and Lovell both made two Apollo flights. Conrad and Stafford also made second flights in Apollo spacecraft, Conrad on Skylab 2 and Stafford in Apollo–Soyuz.

Six of this group, Borman, Lovell, Stafford, Young, Armstrong and Conrad, made flights to the Moon. Lovell and Young went to the Moon twice. Armstrong, Conrad, and Young walked on the Moon. McDivitt was later Apollo Program Director and became the first general officer and would have been either the prime LM Pilot or backup commander for Apollo 14, but left NASA due to a conflict between Alan Shepard and Deke Slayton. John Young also later flew on the Space Shuttle (STS-1 and STS-9) and would retire from NASA in 2004, 42 years after becoming an astronaut. He was both the first and last of his group to go into space.

The last surviving member of this group was Jim Lovell; he died in 2025.

September 19 – Dyna-Soar Group 2 (USA)

On September 19, 1962, Albert Crews was added to the Dyna-Soar program and the names of the six active Dyna-Soar astronauts were announced to the public.

The last surviving member of this group was Albert Crews; he died in 2025.

== 1963 ==
January 10 – Air Force Group 2 (USSR)

ru:2-й набор космонавтов ЦПК ВВС (1963)

Yuri Artyukhin, Eduard Buinovski, Lev Dyomin, Georgy Dobrovolsky, Anatoly Filipchenko, Aleksei Gubarev, Vladislav Gulyayev, Pyotr Kolodin, Eduard Kugno, Anatoli Kuklin, Aleksandr Matinchenko, Vladimir Shatalov, Lev Vorobyov, Anatoly Voronov, Vitaly Zholobov

October 17, 1963 – NASA Group 3 – The Fourteen (USA)

Buzz Aldrin, William Anders, Charles Bassett, Alan Bean, Eugene Cernan, Roger Chaffee, Michael Collins, Walter Cunningham, Donn Eisele, Theodore Freeman, Richard Gordon, Russell Schweickart, David Scott, Clifton Williams

While four members of Group 3 died in accidents before ever reaching space—Chaffee in the Apollo 1 fire, Bassett, Freeman and Williams in crashes of NASA T-38 jet trainers—the other ten all flew on the Apollo program. Aldrin, Bean, Cernan and Scott walked on the Moon. Five of them: Aldrin, Cernan, Collins, Gordon and Scott also flew missions during the Gemini program. Cernan would be the only astronaut from this group to fly to the Moon twice, being assigned to both Apollo 10 and Apollo 17, while Bean would command the Skylab 3 mission.

== 1964 ==
January 25 – Air Force Group 2 Supplemental (USSR)

Georgi Beregovoi (1921–1995)

May 26 – Voskhod Group – Medical Group 1 (USSR)

ru:Набор космонавтов для полёта на корабле «Восход» (1964)

Vladimir Benderov, Georgy Katys, Vasili Lazarev, Boris Polyakov (1938–2021), Aleksei Sorokin, Boris Yegorov

The last surviving member of this group is Boris Polyakov.

June 11 – Civilian Specialist Group 1 (USSR)

Konstantin Feoktistov (1926–2009)

== 1965 ==
June 1 – Journalist Group 1 (USSR)

In 1965, three civilian journalists, Yaroslav Golovanov, Yuri Letunov, Mikhail Rebrov, were selected for cosmonaut training in preparation for flight on a Voskhod mission. When the Voskhod program was canceled, Golovanov and Letunov were dismissed. Rebrov, on the other hand, stayed with the space program as a journalist until 1974.

The last surviving member of this group was Yaroslav Golovanov; he died in 2003.

June 1 – Medical Group 2 (USSR)

Three physicians were selected for the long-duration Voskhod flights: Yevgeni Illyin (born 1937), Aleksandr Kiselyov (born 1934), Yuri Senkevich. All were subsequently canceled to make way for the Soviet Moon program and dismissed at the beginning of the following year.

June 28 – NASA Group 4 – The Scientists (USA)

Owen Garriott, Edward Gibson, Duane Graveline, Joseph Kerwin, Curt Michel, Harrison Schmitt

Graveline and Michel left NASA without flying in space. Schmitt walked on the Moon with Apollo 17. Garriott, Gibson and Kerwin all flew to Skylab. Garriott also flew on Space Shuttle flight STS-9, becoming the first Amateur radio operator (callsign W5LFL) to operate from orbit.

October 28 – Air Force Group 3 (USSR)

ru:3-й набор космонавтов ЦПК ВВС (1965)

Boris Belousov (cosmonaut), Vladimir Degtyarov (born 1932), Anatoli Fyodorov, Yuri Glazkov, Vitali Grishchenko, Veygeni Khludeyev, Leonid Kizim, Pyotr Klimuk, Gennadi Kolesnikov, Aleksandr Kramarenko, Mikhail Lisun, Aleksandr Petrushenko, Vladimir Preobrazhensky, Valery Rozhdestvensky, Gennadi Sarafanov, Ansar Sharafutdinov (born 1939), Vasili Shcheglov, Aleksandr Skvortsov (1942–2024), Eduard Stepanov, Valeri Voloshin, Oleg Yakovlev (cosmonaut), Vyacheslav Zudov

This cosmonaut group was selected for participation in five separate Soyuz programmes that the USSR was running. These included military programs—with and without the Almaz/Salyut space stations—and two lunar programs, only one of which aimed at an actual lunar landing. In the end, only the orbital program and the space station program went ahead. Few of the cosmonauts from this group ever were given the chance to fly.

November – USAF MOL Group 1 (USA)

Michael J. Adams, Albert H. Crews Jr., John L. Finley, Richard E. Lawyer, Lachlan Macleay, Francis G. Neubeck, James M. Taylor, Richard H. Truly.

This group was selected for training for the US Air Force's Manned Orbiting Laboratory (MOL) program. Of this group, only Truly transferred to NASA after the cancellation of the MOL program and later flew on the Space Shuttle. In 1989, Truly became the first astronaut to be NASA Administrator.

== 1966 ==
April 4 – NASA Group 5 (USA)

Vance Brand, John S. Bull, Gerald Carr, Charles Duke, Joseph Engle, Ronald Evans, Edward Givens, Fred Haise, James Irwin, Don Lind, Jack Lousma, Ken Mattingly, Bruce McCandless II, Edgar Mitchell, William Pogue, Stuart Roosa, Jack Swigert, Paul Weitz, Alfred Worden.

Veteran astronaut John Young christened this group the "Original Nineteen", in parody of the original seven Mercury astronauts. Roughly half of them flew in the Apollo program, while others flew during Skylab and the Space Shuttle, with Brand also flying on the American half of the Apollo–Soyuz Test Project in 1975. Engle was the only NASA astronaut to have earned his astronaut wings before his selection.
Two of this group never flew into space: Givens was killed in a car accident in 1967, and Bull resigned from the Astronaut Corps in 1968 after discovering he had pulmonary disease. Engle, Lind, and McCandless were the only ones from this group who never flew an Apollo spacecraft; Brand, Haise, Lousma, Mattingly, and Weitz all flew both an Apollo and a Shuttle (though Haise only flew the Approach and Landing Tests in the Shuttle program, not into space).

May 23 – Civilian Specialist Group 2 (USSR)

Sergei Anokhin, Vladimir Bugrov, Gennadi Dolgopolov, Georgi Grechko, Valeri Kubasov, Oleg Makarov, Vladislav Volkov, Aleksei Yeliseyev

June 30 – USAF MOL Group 2 (USA)

Karol Bobko, Robert Crippen, Gordon Fullerton, Henry Hartsfield, Robert Overmyer.

This group was selected for training for the US Air Force's MOL program. All transferred to NASA after the MOL program was canceled and all five flew on the Space Shuttle as pilot astronauts.

As of 2024, the only surviving member is Robert Crippen.

September – Military Cosmonaut Group (USSR)

Pavel Popovich, Alexei Gubarev, Yuri Artyukhin, Vladimir Gulyaev, Boris Belousov, and Gennadiy Kolesnikov.

Cosmonaut training for the Soyuz 7K-VI Zvezda program, a radically modified Soyuz. In December 1967, the project was closed.

1966–67 – Military Cosmonaut Group (USSR)

Cosmonauts training for aerospace system Project "Spiral", 1969, the 4th Division of the 1st Cosmonaut Training Center Management:

Gherman Titov (1966–70), Anatoly Kuklin (1966–67), Vasily Lazarev (1966–67), Anatoly Filipchenko (1966–67), Leonid Kizim (1969–73), Vladimir Kozelskiy (August 1969 – October 1971) Vladimir Lyakhov (1969–73), Yury Malyshev (1969–73), Alexander Petrushenko (1970–73), Anatoly Berezovoy (1972–73), Anatoly Dedkov (1972–73), Vladimir Dzhanibekov (July–December 1972), Yuri Romanenko (1972), and Lev Vorobyov (1973). In 1973, the department was disbanded in connection with the termination of the project.

== 1967 ==
January 31 – Civilian Specialist Group 2 Supplemental (USSR)

Nikolai Rukavishnikov and Vitali Sevastyanov.

The last surviving member of this group was Vitali Sevastyanov; he died in 2010.

February – Soviet crewed lunar programs cosmonauts in two training groups (USSR)

First group: commanded by Vladimir Komarov (Gagarin, Nikolayev, Bykovskiy, Khrunov; Engineer – Cosmonauts: Gorbatko, Grechko, Sevastyanov, Kubasov, Volkov).
Second group: commanded by Alexei Leonov (Popovich, Belyayev, Volynov, Klimuk; Engineer – Cosmonauts: Makarov, Voronov, Rukavishnikov, Artyukhin).

May 7 – Air Force Group 4 (USSR)

ru:4-й набор космонавтов ЦПК ВВС (1967)

Vladimir Alekseyev, Vladimir Beloborodov, Mikhail Burdayev, Sergei Gaidukov, Vladimir Isakov (born 1940), Vladimir Kovalyonok, Vladimir Kozelsky (born 1942), Vladimir Lyakhov, Yuri Malyshev, Viktor Pisarev (born 1941), Nikolai Porvatkin, Mikhail Sologub

May 22 – Academy of Sciences Group (USSR)

Mars Fathulin, Rudolf Gulyayev, Ordinard Kolomitsev, Vsevolod Yegorov, Valentin Yershov

June – USAF MOL Group 3 (USA)

James Abrahamson, Robert Herres, Robert H. Lawrence Jr, and Donald Peterson.

This group was selected for training for the US Air Force's MOL program. Lawrence was the first African-American to be chosen as an astronaut, but was killed in a jet accident before the MOL program was canceled in 1969. Had Lawrence not died, he would have been, if accepted by NASA, the first African-American astronaut candidate, predating Guion Bluford, Ronald McNair and Frederick Gregory by nine years. Peterson transferred to NASA in 1969 after the MOL cancellation and would fly on the Space Shuttle. Herres would later become the first Vice Chairman of the Joint Chiefs of Staff under the Goldwater–Nichols Act in 1987.

As of 2023, the only surviving member is James Abrahamson.

October 4 – NASA Group 6 – XS-11 (The Excess Eleven) (USA)

Joseph Allen, Philip Chapman, Anthony W. England, Karl Henize, Donald Holmquest, William B. Lenoir, Anthony Llewellyn, Story Musgrave, Brian O'Leary, Robert Parker, William Thornton.

This second group of scientist-astronauts were assigned as support crew members for the last three Apollo missions or as backup crew members for Skylab.

Chapman, Holmquest, Llewellyn, and O'Leary resigned from NASA before the end of the Apollo program, and the rest of the group members eventually flew as mission specialists during the Space Shuttle program. With his flight on STS-80 at the age of 61, Musgrave held the title of "oldest astronaut" prior to John Glenn's second flight and subsequently Don Pettit’s most recent flight. England resigned from NASA in 1972 but rejoined the astronaut corps in 1979.

== 1968 ==
May 27 – Civilian Specialist Group 3 (USSR)

Vladimir Fartushny, Viktor Patsayev, Valeri Yazdovsky

== 1969 ==
August 14 – NASA Group 7 (USA)

Karol Bobko, Robert Crippen, Gordon Fullerton, Henry Hartsfield, Robert Overmyer, Donald H. Peterson, Richard Truly.

This group is all USAF MOL astronauts who transferred to NASA after the cancellation of the MOL program in 1969. All flew on early Space Shuttle flights. Truly, in 1989, would become the first astronaut to be NASA Administrator, holding the post until 1992.

As of July 2024, the final surviving member of this group is Robert Crippen.

September 10 – Civilian Engineer Group (USSR)

Anatoli Demyanenko, Valeriy Makrushin, and Dmitri Yuyukov.

== 1970 ==
April 27 – Air Force Group 5 (USSR)

ru:5-й набор космонавтов ЦПК ВВС (1970)

Anatoli Berezovoi, Aleksandr Dedkov, Vladimir Dzhanibekov, Nikolai Fefelov, Valeri Illarianov, Yuri Isaulov, Vladimir Kozlov, Leonid Popov, Yuri Romanenko

== 1971 ==
February 25 – 1971 Scientific Group (USSR)

Gurgen Ivanyan

May – Shuguang Group 1970 (China)

Chai Hongliang, Dong Xiaohai, Du Jincheng, Fang Guojun, Hu Zhanzi, Li Shichang, Liu Chongfu, Liu Zhongyi, Lu Xiangxiao, Ma Zizhong, Meng Senlin, Shao Zhijian, Wang Fuhe, Wang Fuquan, Wang Quanbo, Wang Rongsen, Wang Zhiyue, Yu Guilin, Zhang Ruxiang

== 1972 ==
March 22 – Civilian Specialist Group 4 (USSR)

Boris Andreyev, Valentin Lebedev, Yuri Ponomaryov

March 22 – Medical Group 3 – USSR

ru:Отряд космонавтов ИМБП

Georgi Machinski, Valeri Polyakov, Lev Smirenny

== 1973 ==
March 27 – Civilian Specialist Group 5 (USSR)

Vladimir Aksyonov, Vladimir Gevorkyan, Aleksandr Ivanchenkov, Valeri Romanov, Valery Ryumin, Gennady Strekalov

== 1974 ==
January 1 – Physician Group (USSR)

Ziyadin Abuzyarov

== 1976 ==
August 23 – Air Force Group 6 – Space shuttle Buran crew (USSR)

ru:6-й набор космонавтов ЦПК ВВС (1976)

Leonid Ivanov, Leonid Kadenyuk, Nikolai Moskalenko, Sergei Protchenko, Yevgeni Saley, Anatoly Solovyev, Vladimir Titov, Vladimir Vasyutin, Alexander Volkov

Protchenko was removed from the squad for health reasons, Ivanov was killed in the crash of a MiG-27 during test pilot training and Kadenyuk was removed from the squad over marital issues (but accepted back into the Cosmonaut Detachment in 1988). Vasyutin concealed a medical condition from doctors that resulted in his falling ill during the Soyuz T-14/ Salyut 7 EO-4 flight causing the premature termination of the mission 4 months early. This resulted in more stringent cosmonaut medical checks which Moskalenko and Saley failed.

November 25 – 1976 Intercosmos Group (USSR)

Mirosław Hermaszewski (Poland), Zenon Jankowski (Poland), Sigmund Jähn (East Germany), Eberhard Köllner (East Germany), Oldřich Pelčák (Czechoslovakia), Vladimír Remek (Czechoslovakia)

== 1977 ==
IMBD (USSR)

ru:Отряд космонавтов ИМБП

July 12 – The first group of test pilots for Buran – Gromov Flight Research Institute group (USSR)

Igor Volk, Oleg Grigoriyevich Kononenko, Anatoly Levchenko, Nikolai Sadovnikov, Rimantas Stankevicius, and Alexander Schukin.

== 1978 ==
January 16 – NASA Group 8 – TFNG Thirty-Five New Guys (USA)

Pilots: Daniel Brandenstein, Michael Coats, Richard Covey, John Creighton, Robert Gibson, Frederick D. Gregory, Frederick Hauck, Jon McBride, Francis "Dick" Scobee, Brewster Shaw, Loren Shriver, David Walker, Donald Williams

Mission specialists: Guion Bluford, James Buchli, John Fabian, Anna Fisher, Dale Gardner, S. David Griggs, Terry Hart, Steven Hawley, Jeffrey Hoffman, Shannon Lucid, Ronald McNair, Richard Mullane, Steven Nagel, George Nelson, Ellison Onizuka, Judith Resnik, Sally Ride, Rhea Seddon, Robert Stewart, Kathryn D. Sullivan, Norman Thagard, James van Hoften

Due to the long delay between the last Apollo mission and the first flight of the Space Shuttle in 1981, few astronauts from the older groups stayed with NASA—though some did, including John Young. Thus, in 1978, a new group of 35 astronauts was selected after 9 years without new astronauts, including the first American female astronauts, with one of them, Judith Resnik, also being the first Jewish American astronaut, as well as the first African-American astronauts to fly, Guion Bluford and Frederick D. Gregory (the first black astronaut was Robert Henry Lawrence Jr), and the first Asian-American, Ellison Onizuka. Bob Stewart was the first Army astronaut to be selected (almost 19 years after the original Mercury Seven). Since then, a new group has been selected roughly every two years.

Two different astronaut groups were formed: pilots and mission specialists. Additionally, the Shuttle Program has payload specialists who are selected for a single mission and are not part of the astronaut corps—mostly scientists, with a few politicians, and many international astronauts.

Of the first of the post-Apollo group, Sally Ride would become the first American woman in space (STS-7). Later, she would fly with Kathryn Sullivan on a Shuttle flight in which Sullivan would become the first American woman to perform an EVA. Dr. Thagard, who flew with Ride on STS-7, would later become the first American to be launched on a Russian rocket (Soyuz TM-21 or "Mir-18") to the Mir space station, while Shannon Lucid would serve on Mir for slightly over six months, breaking all American space duration records (both the Skylab 4 record and Thagard's) from 1996 to 1997 until Sunita Williams, who was selected 20 years later, broke Lucid's record.
Of this group, Scobee, Resnik, Onizuka, and McNair would perish in the Challenger Disaster. Of the astronauts chosen, Anna Fisher remained on active duty the longest, retiring in 2017 (although her tenure included an extended leave of absence from 1989 to 1996), while Robert Gibson and Rhea Seddon became the first active-duty astronauts to marry (both are now retired). Shannon Lucid's tenure was unbroken from 1978 until she announced her retirement in 2012. In later years she served as a space shuttle CAPCOM, up to the final day of the final shuttle mission. After the Challenger disaster, Sally Ride would serve on both the Rogers Commission and the Columbia Accident Investigation Board.

March 1 – 1978 Intercosmos Group (USSR)

Aleksandr Panayotov Aleksandrov (Bulgaria), Dumitru Dediu (Romania), Jose Lopez Falcon (Cuba), Bertalan Farkas (Hungary), Maidarjavyn Ganzorig (Mongolia), Jügderdemidiin Gürragchaa (Mongolia), Georgi Ivanov (Bulgaria), Béla Magyari (Hungary), Arnaldo Tamayo Méndez (Cuba), Dumitru Prunariu (Romania)

May 1 – Spacelab Payload Specialists Group 1 (ESA)

Ulf Merbold (West Germany), Claude Nicollier (Switzerland), Wubbo Ockels (Netherlands), Franco Malerba (Italy)

Air Force Group 7 (USSR)

ru:7-й набор космонавтов ЦПК ВВС (1978)

== 1979 ==
August – USAF Manned Spaceflight Engineer Program – Group 1 (USA)

Frank J. Casserino, Jeffrey E. Detroye, Michael A. Hamel, Terry A. Higbee, Daryl J. Joseph, Malcolm W. Lydon, Gary E. Payton, Jerry J. Rij, Paul A. Sefchek, Eric E. Sundberg, David M. Vidrine, John B. Watterson, Keith C. Wright

Of this group, only Payton ever flew into space, as a Payload Specialist aboard a dedicated Department of Defense Shuttle flight.

April 1 – 1979 Intercosmos Group (USSR)

Tuân Pham (Vietnam), Thanh Liem Bui (Vietnam)

== 1980 ==
May 29 – NASA Group 9 (USA)

Pilots: John Blaha, Charles Bolden, Roy Bridges, Guy Gardner, Ronald Grabe, Bryan O'Connor, Richard N. Richards, Michael J. Smith
Mission specialists: James Bagian, Franklin Chang–Diaz, Mary Cleave, Bonnie Dunbar, William Fisher, David Hilmers, David Leestma, John Lounge, Jerry Ross, Sherwood Spring, Robert Springer
International mission specialists: Claude Nicollier, Wubbo Ockels
Of this group, Franklin Chang-Diaz would become the first Hispanic-American in space, Michael Smith would perish in the Challenger disaster, and John Blaha would fly aboard the Mir space station. Both Jerry Ross and Chang-Diaz currently jointly hold the record of number of crewed spaceflights flown, at seven. Charles Bolden was chosen in 2009 to become the second NASA astronaut and the first African-American to the post of NASA Administrator on a full-time basis (although Frederick Gregory, who is also African-American and a former Shuttle commander, held the post on a temporary basis between the departure of Sean O'Keefe and the appointment of Michael Griffin in 2005). The announcement, made a day before the conclusion of the STS-125 flight to the Hubble Space Telescope, was coincidental, because Bolden was the pilot on the telescope's deployment flight in 1990.

July 30 – LII–1/IMBP–3/MAP/NPOE-5/AN–2 Cosmonaut Group (Soviet Union)

LII-1: Anatoly Levchenko, Alexandr Shchukin, Rimantas Stankevicius, Igor Volk
IBMP: (ru:Отряд космонавтов ИМБП) Galina Amelkina, Yelena Dobrokvashina, Larisa Pozharskaya, Tamara Zakharova
MAP: Svetlana Savitskaya
NPOE: Yekaterina Ivanova, Natalya Kuleshova, Irina Pronina
AN–2: Irina Latysheva

1980 – CNES Group 1 (France)

Patrick Baudry, Jean-Loup Chrétien
Chrétien and Baudry would become the first Frenchmen in space. Chrétien flew with Soviets to Salyut 7 in 1982, and Baudry on Space Shuttle STS-51-G flight in 1985. Chrétien would later fly to the Space Station Mir and would become a Shuttle mission specialist in the 1990s.

== 1982 ==
August – USAF Manned Spaceflight Engineer Program (Group 2)

James B. Armor Jr., Michael W. Booen, Livingston L. Holder Jr., Larry D. James, Charles E. Jones, Maureen C. LaComb, Michael R. Mantz, Randy T. Odle, William A. Pailes, Craig A. Puz, Katherine E. Roberts, Jess M. Sponable, W. David Thompson, Glenn S. Yeakel

Jones was killed in the September 11 attacks as a passenger aboard American Airlines Flight 11. Of this group, only Pailes ever flew in space, aboard a dedicated Department of Defense Shuttle mission as a Payload Specialist.

September 11 – 1982 Intercosmos Group (India)

Ravish Malhotra, Rakesh Sharma

December 1 – Spacelab Payload Specialists Group (Germany)

Reinhard Furrer, Ernst Messerschmid

== 1983 ==
April 25 – The second group of test pilots for the project "Buran" – Gromov Flight Research Institute group) (USSR)

Ural Sultanov and Magomed Tolboev

December – NRC Group (Canada)

Roberta Bondar, Marc Garneau, Steve MacLean, Ken Money, Robert Thirsk, and Bjarni Tryggvason

This first Canadian astronaut group was selected by the National Research Council and were transferred to the Canadian Space Agency (CSA) when it was created in 1989. All the astronauts flew on the US Space Shuttle by 1997 except Ken Money, who resigned from CSA in 1992.

== 1984 ==
February 15 – NPOE–6 Cosmonaut Group (Soviet Union)

Aleksandr Kaleri and Sergei Yemelyanov

May 23 – NASA Group 10 – The Maggots (USA)

Pilots: Kenneth Cameron, John Casper, Frank Culbertson, Sidney Gutierrez, Blaine Hammond, Michael McCulley, James Wetherbee

Mission specialists: James Adamson, Ellen Baker, Mark Brown, Sonny Carter, Marsha Ivins, Mark Lee, David Low, William Shepherd, Kathryn Thornton, Charles "Lacy" Veach

Of this group, William Shepherd would become the commander of the first International Space Station crew (Expedition 1). James Wetherbee would become the only person to command five spaceflight missions. Sonny Carter died in 1991 in a plane crash while on NASA business.

June 12 – The third group of test pilots for the project "Buran" – Gromov Flight Research Institute group (USSR)

Victor Zabolotski.

== 1985 ==
April – Saudi Arabia

Sultan bin Salman Al Saud and Abdulmohsen Al-Bassam

Al Saud flew aboard Space Shuttle Discovery in 1985 as a payload specialist on mission STS-51-G which delivered Arabsat-1B to orbit. He became the first Arab, the first Muslim, and the first member of a royal family to travel to space. Al-Bassam was his backup.

May – ISRO Insat Group (India)

Nagapathi Chidambar Bhat and Paramaswaren Radhakrishnan Nair.

Although selected to fly on the Space Shuttle, none of the group members flew due to the Challenger disaster of 1986. Bhat was assigned to a shuttle flight that was cancelled in the wake of Challenger.

June (Mexico)

Rodolfo Neri Vela, Ricardo Peralta y Fabi

Note: Neri Vela flew on Shuttle mission STS-61-B, in November 1985.

June 4 – NASA Group 11 (USA)

Pilots: Michael A. Baker, Robert D. Cabana, Brian Duffy, Terence Henricks, Stephen Oswald, Stephen Thorne

Mission specialists: Jerome Apt, Charles Gemar, Linda Godwin, Richard Hieb, Tamara Jernigan, Carl Meade, Pierre Thuot

* Thorne was killed in the crash of a private airplane before his first flight assignment.

July 19 – NASA Teacher in Space Program (USA)

Christa McAuliffe, Barbara Morgan

McAuliffe and Morgan were selected as the prime and backup Payload Specialists for the STS-51-L mission in 1985. McAuliffe was killed in the Challenger disaster, 73 seconds after liftoff. Morgan would later join the NASA Astronaut Corps in 1998. She flew on the STS-118 mission in 2007, 21 years after Challenger.

August 1 – 1985 NASDA Group (Japan)

Mamoru Mohri, Chiaki Mukai, Takao Doi

August – USAF Manned Spaceflight Engineer Program – Group 3 (USA)

Joseph J. Caretto, Robert B. Crombie, Frank M. DeArmond, David P. Staib Jr., Teresa M. Stevens

September 2 – GKNII–2/NPOE–7 Cosmonaut Group (USSR)

GKNII: Viktor Afanasyev, Anatoly Artsebarsky, Gennadi Manakov
NPOE: Sergei Krikalyov, Andrei Zaytsev

September 18 – CNES Group 2 (France)

Claudie André–Deshays, Jean–François Clervoy, Jean–Jacques Favier, Jean–Pierre Haigneré, Frédéric Patat, Michel Tognini, Michel Viso

September 30 – 1985 Intercosmos Group (Syria)

Muhammed Ahmed Faris, Munir Habib Habib

October – Indonesian Palapa Group (Indonesia)

Taufik Akbar, Pratiwi Sudarmono

Due to the Challenger accident, none of the group members flew in space. Sudarmono was assigned to a shuttle flight in 1986, with Akbar as her backup.

December 27 – ATLAS–1 (ESA)

Dirk D. Frimout (Belgium)

IMBD (USSR)

ru:Отряд космонавтов ИМБП

== 1986 ==
January 2 – The fourth group of test pilots for the project "Buran" – Gromov Flight Research Institute group (USSR)

Sergey Tresvyatski and Yuri Schaeffer.

Per the June 5, 1987 decision of the Interdepartmental Qualification Committee (IAC), all Buran test pilots were awarded the qualification test cosmonaut.

== 1987 ==
January 5 – Shipka Group (Bulgaria)

Aleksandr Aleksandrov and Krasimir Stoyanov

March 26 – TsPK–8/NPOE-8 Cosmonaut Group (Soviet Union)

ru:8-й набор космонавтов ЦПК ВВС (1987)

TsPK: Valery Korzun, Vladimir Dezhurov, Yuri Gidzenko, Yuri Malenchenko, Vasily Tsibliyev
NPOE: Sergei Avdeyev

June 5 – NASA Group 12 – The GAFFers (USA)

Pilots: Andrew M. Allen, Kenneth Bowersox, Curtis Brown, Kevin Chilton, Donald McMonagle, William Readdy, Kenneth Reightler

Mission specialists: Thomas Akers, Jan Davis, Michael Foale, Gregory Harbaugh, Mae Jemison, Bruce Melnick, Mario Runco, James Voss

The group's informal nickname is an acronym for "George Abbey Final Fifteen." Of this group, Mae Jemison would become the first female African-American in space, while Michael Foale would serve on extended missions to both Mir and the International Space Station, as well as a mission to service the Hubble Space Telescope.
At the time of the Columbia accident in 2003, William Readdy was Associate Administrator for Space Flight and Kenneth Bowersox was commanding the Expedition 6 crew on the ISS. Chilton, after leaving NASA, became the first NASA astronaut to become a General (O-10) in the US Air Force (Lt. Gen. Thomas Stafford, USAF, and VADM Richard Truly, USN were three-star officers) and held the position of commander, US Strategic Command.

August 3 – 1987 German Group

Renate Brümmer, Hans Schlegel, Gerhard Thiele, Heike Walpot, Ulrich Walter

== 1988 ==
February 12 – OS "Mir" Group (Afghanistan)

Mohammad Dauran Ghulam Masum, Abdul Ahad Mohmand

Air Force Group 9 (USSR)

ru:9-й набор космонавтов ЦПК ВВС (1988)

== 1989 ==
January 25 – IMBP–5/GKNII–3/NPOE–9/TsPK–10 Cosmonaut Group (Soviet Union)

ru:10-й набор космонавтов ЦПК ВВС (1989)

IMBP: (ru:Отряд космонавтов ИМБП) Vladimir Karashtin, Vasili Lukiyanyuk, Boris Morukov
GNKII: Anatoli Polonsky, Valeri Tokarev, Aleksandr Yablontsev
NPOE: Nikolai Budarin, Yelena Kondakova, Aleksandr Poleshchuk, Yury Usachov
TsPK: Sergei Kirchevsky, Gennady Padalka, Yury Onufriyenko

22 March – The last group of test pilots for the Buran project – Gromov Flight Research Institute group) (USSR)

Yuri Prikhodko
Officially, the cosmonaut corps LII (Letno-ispitatelny Institut = Flight Research Institute) ceased to exist in 2002, having gone through a long period of inactivity since the closure of the Buran program in 1993. Of all those selected and trained, only two cosmonauts traveled to space: Igor Volk and Anatoly Levchenko. More information about the Buran space flight program and Soyuz-Savior, the Soyuz-spasatel program and its cosmonauts, who were trained to fly in space, can be found on the Buran program website.

May 23 – 1989 Italian Group

Franco Malerba, Franco Rossitto, Umberto Guidoni, Cristiano Batalli Cosmovici

September 29 – ATLAS Payload Specialists (NASA)

Charles R. Chappell, Michael Lampton, Byron K. Lichtenberg

November 25 – Project Juno (UK-Soviet Union)

Helen Sharman (UK) and Timothy Mace (UK)
Sharman became the first British-born person to go into space onboard Soyuz TM-12 in May 1991.

== 1990 ==
January 17 – NASA Group 13 – The Hairballs (USA)

Pilots: Kenneth Cockrell, Eileen Collins, William G. Gregory, James Halsell, Charles Precourt, Richard Searfoss, Terrence Wilcutt

Mission specialists: Daniel Bursch, Leroy Chiao, Michael R. Clifford, Bernard Harris, Susan Helms, Thomas David Jones, William McArthur, James Newman, Ellen Ochoa, Ronald Sega, Nancy Currie, Donald A. Thomas, Janice Voss, Carl E. Walz, Peter Wisoff, David Wolf

Collins would go on to be the first female shuttle pilot, the first female shuttle commander, and then commander of the second "Return to Flight" mission in 2005. The "Hairballs" nickname, according to Jones in his book Sky Walking, came after the group, the 13th NASA astronaut class, put a black cat on its group patch.

February – CNES Group 3 (France)

Léopold Eyharts, Jean-Marc Gasparini, Philippe Perrin, Benoit Silve

Group 3 was the last group of CNES astronauts chosen. In 1999, all remaining active CNES astronauts were transferred to the ESA Astronaut Corps.

May 11 – TsPK–11 Cosmonaut Group (Soviet Union)

ru:11-й набор космонавтов ЦПК ВВС (1990)

Talgat Musabayev, Vladimir Severin, Salizhan Sharipov, Sergei Vozovikov, Sergei Zalyotin

October 8 – 1990 German Group

Reinhold Ewald, Klaus–Dietrich Flade

== 1992 ==
March 3 – NPOE-10 Cosmonaut Group (Russia)

Aleksandr Lazutkin, Sergei Treshchov, Pavel Vinogradov

March 31 – NASA Group 14 – The Hogs (USA)

Pilots: Scott Horowitz, Brent Jett, Kevin Kregel, Kent Rominger

Mission specialists: Daniel T. Barry, Charles Brady, Catherine Coleman, Michael Gernhardt, John Grunsfeld, Wendy Lawrence, Jerry Linenger, Richard Linnehan, Michael Lopez-Alegria, Scott Parazynski, Winston E. Scott, Steven Smith, Joseph Tanner, Andy Thomas, Mary Weber

International mission specialists: Marc Garneau (Canada), Chris Hadfield (Canada), Maurizio Cheli (Italy), Jean-François Clervoy (France), Koichi Wakata (Japan)

Beginning with this group, non-US astronauts representing their home country's space agencies were brought in and trained alongside their NASA counterparts as full-fledged mission specialists, eligible to be assigned to any shuttle mission.

April – 1992 NASDA Group (Japan)

Koichi Wakata

June – CSA Group 2 (Canada)

Dafydd Williams, Julie Payette, Chris Hadfield and Michael McKay

The second Canadian astronaut group were selected by CSA. McKay was selected as an alternate after Robert Stewart left the Canadian Space Agency program to accept a position at the University of Calgary. All the astronauts flew on the US Space Shuttle except Michael McKay, who resigned due to medical reasons.

May 15 – 1992 ESA Group (ESA)

Maurizio Cheli (Italy), Jean–François Clervoy (France), Pedro Duque (Spain), Christer Fuglesang (Sweden), Marianne Merchez (Belgium), Thomas Reiter (Germany)

== 1994 ==
April 1 – NPOE–11 Cosmonaut Group (Russia)

Nadezhda Kuzhelnaya, Mikhail Tyurin

December 12 – NASA Group 15 – The Flying Escargot (USA)

Pilots: Scott Altman, Jeffrey Ashby, Michael Bloomfield, Joe Edwards, Dominic Gorie, Rick Husband, Steven Lindsey, Pamela Melroy, Susan (Still) Kilrain, Frederick Sturckow.

Mission specialists: Michael Anderson, Kalpana Chawla, Robert Curbeam, Kathryn Hire, Janet Kavandi, Edward Lu, Carlos Noriega, James Reilly, Stephen Robinson.

International mission specialists: Jean–Loup Chrétien (France), Takao Doi (Japan), Michel Tognini (France), Dafydd Williams (Canada).

Husband, Anderson and Chawla were crewmembers on the final Columbia mission. Chrétien trained as a backup Spacelab crew member in the 1980s and flew on both US and Soviet/Russian spacecraft, along with being the first non-US or Soviet/Russian astronaut to perform a space walk.

== 1996 ==
February 9 – MKS/RKKE–12 Cosmonaut Group (Russia)

MKS: Oleg Kotov, Yuri Shargin
RKKE: Konstantin Kozeyev, Sergei Revin

March 26 – MKS supplemental cosmonaut group (Russia)

Oleg Kononenko

May 1 – NASA Group 16 – The Sardines (USA)

Pilots: Duane G. Carey, Stephen Frick, Charles O. Hobaugh, James M. Kelly, Mark Kelly, Scott Kelly, Paul Lockhart, Christopher Loria, William Cameron McCool, Mark L. Polansky.

Mission specialists: David McDowell Brown, Daniel C. Burbank, Yvonne Cagle, Fernando Caldeiro, Charles Camarda, Laurel Clark, Michael Fincke, Patrick G. Forrester, John Herrington, Joan Higginbotham, Sandra Magnus, Michael J. Massimino, Richard Mastracchio, Lee Morin, Lisa Nowak, Donald Pettit, John L. Phillips, Paul W. Richards, Piers Sellers, Heidemarie Stefanyshyn-Piper, Daniel M. Tani, Rex J. Walheim, Peggy Whitson, Jeffrey Williams, Stephanie Wilson.

International mission specialists: Pedro Duque (Spain), Christer Fuglesang (Sweden), Umberto Guidoni (Italy), Steve MacLean (Canada), Mamoru Mohri (Japan), Soichi Noguchi (Japan), Julie Payette (Canada), Philippe Perrin (France), Gerhard Thiele (Germany).

Brown, Clark and McCool were crewmembers on the final Columbia mission. Mark and Scott Kelly are twin brothers; James Kelly is not related. Loria resigned from his shuttle mission due to injury and never flew before retiring from the astronaut corps. Nowak, who flew on STS-121, was arrested on February 5, 2007, after confronting a woman entangled in a love triangle with a fellow astronaut. She was dismissed by NASA on March 6, the first astronaut to be both grounded and dismissed (prior astronauts who were grounded due to non-medical issues usually resigned or retired).

June – NASDA Group (Japan)

Soichi Noguchi

October – China Group 1996 (China)

Li Qinglong, Wu Jie

Trained at Yuri Gagarin Cosmonaut Training Center, joined other twelve pilots as Chinese Group 1 in 1998.

November – Shuttle-97 Group (Ukraine)

Leonid Kadeniuk, Yaroslav Pustovyi

== 1997 ==
April (?) – Shuttle Group (Israel)

Yitzhak Mayo, Ilan Ramon

Ramon was the first Israeli astronaut to fly in space and also a Payload Specialist on the final mission of Space Shuttle Columbia (STS-107).

July 28 – TsPK–12/RKKE-13 Cosmonaut Group (Russia)

TsPK: Dmitri Kondratyev, Yury Lonchakov, Sergei Moshchenko, Oleg Moshkin, Roman Romanenko, Aleksandr Skvortsov, Maksim Surayev, Konstantin Valkov, Sergey Volkov
RKKE: Oleg Skripochka, Fyodor Yurchikhin

== 1998 ==
January – Chinese Group 1 (China)

Chen Quan, Deng Qingming, Fei Junlong, Jing Haipeng, Li Qinglong, Liu Boming, Liu Wang, Nie Haisheng, Pan Zhanchun, Wu Jie, Yang Liwei, Zhai Zhigang, Zhang Xiaoguang, Zhao Chuandong

In October 2003, Yang Liwei became the first man to be sent into space by the space program of China, and his mission, Shenzhou 5, made the PRC the third country to independently send people into space.

In 2014, Chen Quan, Li Qinglong, Pan Zhanchun, Wu Jie and Zhao Chuandong retired from the corps due to age without having flown a mission.

February 24 – RKKE-14 Cosmonaut Group (Russia)

Mikhail Korniyenko

March 2 – OS "Mir" Stefanik Group (Slovakia)

Ivan Bella, Michal Fulier

June 4 – NASA Group 17 – The Penguins (USA)

Pilots: Lee Archambault, Christopher Ferguson, Kenneth Ham, Gregory C. Johnson, Gregory H. Johnson, William Oefelein, Alan Poindexter, George Zamka

Mission specialists: Clayton Anderson, Tracy Caldwell, Gregory Chamitoff, Timothy Creamer, Michael Foreman, Michael E. Fossum, Stanley Love, Leland Melvin, Barbara Morgan, John D. Olivas, Nicholas Patrick, Garrett Reisman, Patricia Robertson, Steven Swanson, Douglas Wheelock, Sunita Williams, Neil Woodward

International mission specialists: Léopold Eyharts (France), Paolo Nespoli (Italy), Marcos Pontes (Brazil), Hans Schlegel (Germany), Robert Thirsk (Canada), Bjarni Tryggvason (Canada), Roberto Vittori (Italy)

This group includes Barbara Morgan, who was the backup "Teacher-In-Space" for Christa McAuliffe of the ill-fated Challenger Disaster in 1986. While often referred to as an Educator Astronaut, Morgan was selected by NASA as a mission specialist before the Educator Astronaut Project was formed.
Patricia Robertson (née Hilliard) was killed in the crash of a private airplane before she was assigned to a Shuttle mission.
Oefelein was dismissed from NASA in 2007 due to his involvement in a love triangle with fellow astronaut Lisa Nowak.

October 7 – 1998 ESA Group (ESA)

Frank De Winne (Belgium), Léopold Eyharts (France), André Kuipers (Netherlands), Paolo Nespoli (Italy), Hans Schlegel (Germany), Roberto Vittori (Italy)

== 1999 ==
February – 1999 NASDA Group (Japan)

Satoshi Furukawa, Akihiko Hoshide, Naoko Sumino

1 November – 1999 ESA Group (Europe)

Claudie André-Deshays, Philippe Perrin, Michel Tognini

The three remaining CNES (France) astronauts transferred to the ESA's astronaut corps in 1999.

== 2000 ==
July 26 – NASA Group 18 – The Bugs (USA)

Pilots: Dominic A. Antonelli, Eric A. Boe, Kevin A. Ford, Ronald J. Garan Jr., Douglas G. Hurley, Terry W. Virts Jr., Barry E. Wilmore

Mission specialists: Michael R. Barratt, Robert L. Behnken, Stephen G. Bowen, B. Alvin Drew, Andrew J. Feustel, Michael T. Good, Timothy L. Kopra, K. Megan McArthur, Karen L. Nyberg, Nicole P. Stott

== 2003 ==
May 23 – TsPK-13/RKKE-15/IMBP-6 Cosmonaut Group (Russia)

TsPK: Anatoli Ivanishin, Aleksandr Samokutyayev, Anton Shkaplerov, Evgeny Tarelkin, Sergei Zhukov
RKKE: Oleg Artemyev, Andrei Borisenko, Mark Serov
IMBP: (ru:Отряд космонавтов ИМБП) Sergey Ryazansky

Kazakhstan – Group 1

Aydyn Aimbetov, Mukhtar Aymakhanov

September 11 – SpaceShipOne (Commercial Astronauts) (USA)

Brian Binnie, Mike Melvill, Doug Shane, Peter Siebold
* 2003 marked the first group of commercial astronauts. Only Binnie and Melville reached space, during a SpaceShipOne flight. Siebold has also piloted SpaceShipTwo, but no flights have yet reached space.

== 2004 ==
May 6 – NASA Group 19 – The Peacocks (USA)

Pilots: Randolph Bresnik, James Dutton

Mission specialists: Thomas Marshburn, Christopher Cassidy, R. Shane Kimbrough, José M. Hernández, Robert Satcher, Shannon Walker

Educator mission specialists: Joseph M. Acaba, Richard R. Arnold, Dorothy Metcalf–Lindenburger

International mission specialists: Satoshi Furukawa (Japan), Akihiko Hoshide (Japan), Naoko Yamazaki (Japan)

This group was the first to include educator mission specialists, and the last group to train for Space Shuttle flights.

== 2006 ==
March 30 – Virgin Galactic Astronaut Pilots Group (Commercial Astronauts) (UK)

Steve Johnson, Alistair Hoy, David MacKay, Alex Tai

September 4 – Angkasawan Group (Malaysia)

Sheikh Muszaphar Shukor, Faiz Khaleed, Siva Vanajah, Mohammed Faiz Kamaludin
In 2006, four Malaysians were chosen to train for a flight to the International Space Station through the Angkasawan program. Sheikh Muszaphar became the first Malaysian in space when he flew aboard Soyuz TMA-11.

October 11 – TsPK-14/RKKE-16 Cosmonaut Group (Russia)

TsPK: Aleksandr Misurkin, Oleg Novitskiy, Aleksey Ovchinin, Maksim Ponomaryov, Sergey Ryzhikov
RKKE: Yelena Serova, Nikolai Tikhonov

December 25 – Korean Astronaut Program Group

Yi So-yeon, Ko San
Ko San was chosen as the prime candidate over Yi So-yeon in September 2007. Yi So-yeon became prime candidate in March 2008 and made a trip to the ISS with the agency that year.

== 2008 ==
July – Virgin Galactic Astronaut Pilots Group (Commercial Astronauts) (UK)

Robert Bendall, Rich Dancaster, Brad Lambert

== 2009 ==
February 25 – JAXA Group (Japan)

Takuya Onishi, Kimiya Yui

May 13 – CSA Group (Canada)

Jeremy Hansen, David Saint-Jacques

May 20 – ESA Group – The Shenanigans (ESA)

Samantha Cristoforetti (Italy), Alexander Gerst (Germany), Andreas Mogensen (Denmark), Luca Parmitano (Italy), Timothy Peake (United Kingdom), Thomas Pesquet (France).
8,413 applications were received. Of those, 1,430 (17%) were women. The most common first citizenship of the applicants was France (22.1%), Germany (21.4%), Italy (11.0%), the United Kingdom (9.8%), and Spain (9.4%).

June 29 – NASA Group 20 – Chumps (USA)

Mission specialists: Serena M. Auñón, Jeanette J. Epps, Jack D. Fischer, Michael S. Hopkins, Kjell N. Lindgren, Kathleen (Kate) Rubins, Scott D. Tingle, Mark T. Vande Hei, Reid Wiseman
International mission specialists: Jeremy Hansen (Canada), Norishige Kanai (Japan), Takuya Onishi (Japan), David Saint-Jacques (Canada), Kimiya Yui (Japan)
NASA selected the nine members of Group 20 from over 3500 applicants. The NASA candidates were announced in June; international astronauts were added later that year. This was the first group of astronauts chosen for the post-Space Shuttle era and not trained to fly the Shuttle. Fischer, Tingle, and Wiseman were selected as pilots, but there is currently no distinction between pilots and non-pilots: all are considered mission specialists.

September 8 – JAXA Group (Japan)

Norishige Kanai

== 2010 ==
March – Chinese Group 2 (China)

7 new astronauts (5 men, 2 women)

Cai Xuzhe, Chen Dong, Liu Yang, Tang Hongbo, Wang Yaping, Ye Guangfu, Zhang Lu

April 12 – Association of Spaceflight Professionals – Group 1

Jim Crowell, Bruce Davis, Kristine Ferrone, Amnon Govrin, Chad Healy, Ryan Kobrick, Joseph Palaia, Luís Saraiva, Brian Shiro, Laura Stiles, Veronica Ann Zabala-Aliberto

June 7 – Association of Spaceflight Professionals – Group 2 (Commercial Astronauts)

Ben Corbin, José Miguel Hurtado, Jr, Jason Reimuller, Todd Romberger, Erik Seedhouse, Alli Taylor

October 12 – TsPK-15/RKKE-17/RKKE-18 Cosmonaut Group (Russia)

TsPK-15: Aleksey Khomenchuk (withdrawn), Denis Matveev, Sergey Prokopyev
RKKE-17: Andrei Babkin (never flew), Sergey Kud-Sverchkov
RKKE-18: Ivan Vagner, Svyatoslav Morozov (withdrawn)

== 2011 ==
January–February – Enrolled in a United squad of Roscosmos astronauts (Russia)

Oleg Artemyev, Andrei Babkin, Ivan Vagner, Andrei Borisenko, Sergei Zhukov, Oleg Kononenko, Mikhail Kornienko, Sergey Kud-Sverchkov, Svyatoslav Morozov, Sergei Revin, Sergey Ryazansky, Yelena Serova, Nikolai Tikhonov.

From 1 January 2011 at the Research Institute of the Y. A. Gagarin Cosmonaut Training Center is a single detachment of the Russian Space Agency astronauts, which in 2015 consisted of 38 people. The next set of candidates was announced at the beginning of 2016, then postponed until 2017. In September 2016, the unit counted 31 astronauts.

February 28 – Association of Spaceflight Professionals – Group 3

Christopher Altman, Jon-Erik Dahlin, Melania Guerra, Mindy Howard, Kris Lehnhardt, Abhishek Tripathi, Cosan Unuvar, Pavel Zagadailov, Luis Zea

October 26 – Virgin Galactic Astronaut Pilots Group (Commercial Astronauts) (UK)

Keith Colmer

== 2012 ==
February – Enrolled in a United squad of Roscosmos cosmonauts (Russia)

Fyodor Yurchikhin

October 30 – 2012 Cosmonaut Group (Russia)

Finalists: Oleg Blinov (did not fly), Nikolai Chub, Pyotr Dubrov, Andrey Fedyaev, Ignat Ignatov, Anna Kikina, Sergey Korsakov, Dmitry Petelin

== 2013 ==
May 8 Virgin Galactic Astronaut Pilots Group (Commercial Astronauts) (UK)

Frederick W. Sturckow (former NASA astronaut), Michael "Sooch" Masucci

June 3 – Association of Spaceflight Professionals – Group 4

David Ballinger, Jessica Cherry, Michael Gallagher, Jamie Guined, Tanya Markow-Estes, Aaron Persad

June 17 – NASA Group 21 – 8-Balls (US)

Josh A. Cassada, Victor Glover, Tyler N. Hague, Christina M. Hammock, Nicole Aunapu Mann, Anne C. McClain, Jessica U. Meir, Andrew R. Morgan

== 2014 ==
July 24 – Virgin Galactic Astronaut Pilots Group (Commercial Astronauts) (UK)

Todd Ericson

August 14 – Individual set into a United detachment of Roscosmos astronauts (Russia)

Mukhtar Aimakhanov

== 2015 ==
January 23 – Virgin Galactic Astronaut Pilots Group (Commercial Astronauts) (UK)

Mark Stucky

July – ESA Astronaut Corps

Matthias Maurer

Copenhagen Suborbitals (Commercial Astronauts) (Denmark)

Mads Stenfatt, Anna Olsen, Carsten Olsen

== 2017 ==
June 7 – NASA Group 22 – The Turtles (USA)

Kayla Barron, Zena Cardman, Raja Chari, Matthew Dominick, Robert Hines, Warren Hoburg, Jonny Kim, Robb Kulin (resigned), Jasmin Moghbeli, Loral O'Hara, Francisco Rubio, Jessica Watkins.

Kulin resigned from NASA in August 2018 before completing his training.

July 1 – 2017 CSA Group (Canada)

Jenni Gibbons, Joshua Kutryk

April 19 – 2017 Die Astronautin Selection (Germany)

Insa Thiele-Eich, Nicola Baumann (Baumann was later replaced by Suzanna Randall)

== 2018 ==
August 10 – 2018 Cosmonaut Group (Russia)

Konstantin Borisov, Aleksandr Gorbunov, Alexander Grebenkin, Sergei Mikayev, Kirill Peskov, Oleg Platonov, Yevgeny Prokopyev (withdrawn), Alexey Zubritsky

- All but Yevgeny Prokopyev passed the state exam in December 2020 to be qualified for spaceflight assignments; Propkopyev did not qualify and was reassigned to basic space training.

September 3 – Emirati Astronaut Group (United Arab Emirates)

Hazza Al Mansouri, Sultan Al Neyadi

- In 2018, Al Mansouri and Al Neyadi were announced as candidates to fly to the ISS on a Soyuz, as guest cosmonauts (Al Mansouri flew in 2019, with Al Neyadi as his backup). In 2020, the two were named to be assigned to Houston to train as full-fledged mission specialist astronauts and to join the cadre of International Partner Astronauts. Al Neyadi later flew on SpaceX Crew-6 in March 2023, being the first long duration Emirati Astronaut.

== 2019 ==
December – 1st Gaganyatri Group (India)

Prasanth Nair, Ajit Krishnan, Angad Pratap, Shubhanshu Shukla

- Nair, Krishnan, Pratap and Shukla are expected to fly on the first crewed Gaganyaan mission (Gaganyaan-4) in 2027. Shukla has also been named to the crew of Axiom Mission 4 as pilot, a NASA, Axiom and ISRO collaborated, short-duration mission to the International Space Station, which launched in June 2025.

== 2020 ==
October 8 – Chinese Group 3 (China)

- China announced the selection of 18 new astronauts (17 men and 1 woman), whose names were partially revealed, in the following categories:

7 spacecraft pilots: Tang Shengjie, Jiang Xinlin, Li Cong, Li Guangsu, Song Lingdong, Chen Zhongrui, Zhang Zhiyuan
7 flight engineers: Zhu Yangzhu, Wang Haoze, Wang Jie, Wu Fei, plus three not yet named
4 mission payload specialists: Gui Haichao, Zhang Hongzhang, plus two not yet named

== 2021 ==
January 27 – 2021 Cosmonaut Group (Russia)

Sergey Irtuganov (resigned), Alexander Kolyabin, Sergey Teteryatnikov, Kiviryan Harutyunovich

March 30 – Inspiration4 (USA)

Jared Isaacman, Sian Proctor, Hayley Arceneaux, Chris Sembroski

Privately funded by mission commander Isaacman, Inspiration 4 was the first all civilian orbital spaceflight mission and the first human orbital spaceflight not funded by a nation state. 2021's Inspiration4 also made the highest human orbit of the 21st century. Other mission accomplishments of note: Mission pilot Proctor became the first female commercial astronaut spaceship pilot and the first African American female spacecraft pilot, and medical officer Arceneaux became the first astronaut to fly with a prosthesis.

April 10 – Emirati Astronaut Group 2 (United Arab Emirates)

Nora Al Matrooshi, Mohammad Al Mulla

- The two UAE astronauts began training alongside the NASA Astronaut Group 23 class after their selection.

December 6 – NASA Group 23 – The Flies (USA)

Nichole Ayers, Marcos Berríos, Christina Birch, Deniz Burnham, Luke Delaney, Andre Douglas, Jack Hathaway, Anil Menon, Christopher Williams, Jessica Wittner.

== 2022 ==
March 30 – Polaris program Group 1 (USA)

Jared Isaacman, Scott Poteet, Sarah Gillis, Anna Menon

October 2 – Chinese Group 4 (China)

- China announced the selection of 12–14 new astronauts, whose names were not revealed, in the following categories:

7–8 spacecraft pilots
5–6 flight engineers
2 mission payload specialists: Lai Ka-ying plus one not yet named

November 23 – 2022 ESA Astronaut Group

- Career - The Hoppers: Sophie Adenot (France), Pablo Álvarez Fernández (Spain), Rosemary Coogan (UK), Raphaël Liégeois (Belgium), Marco Sieber (Switzerland)
- Reserve/Project - The Chameleons: Meganne Christian (UK), Anthea Comellini (Italy), Sara García Alonso (Spain), John McFall (UK), Andrea Patassa (Italy), Carmen Possnig (Austria), Arnaud Prost (France), Amelie Schoenenwald (Germany), Aleš Svoboda (Czech Republic), Sławosz Uznański (Poland), Marcus Wandt (Sweden), and Nicola Winter (Germany)

== 2023 ==
February 12 – Saudi Astronaut Group 2 (Saudi Arabia)

Rayyanah Barnawi, Ali AlQarni, Mariam Fardous, Ali AlGhamdi

- Rayyanah and Ali flew as mission specialists on board the Axiom Mission 2 flight to the ISS which launched on May 21, 2023

March 8 – Australian Astronaut Group 1 (Australia)

Katherine Bennell-Pegg

April – Turkish Astronaut (Group 1)

Alper Gezeravcı, Tuva Cihangir Atasever
- Alper flew onboard the Axiom Mission 3 mission to the ISS which launched in January 2024
- Tuva flew onboard the suborbital Galactic 07 mission which launched in June 2024

April/July – 2023 JAXA Group (Japan)

Makoto Suwa, Ayu Yoneda

June – Others

Alysson Muotri

== 2024 ==
May 27 – HUNOR 1 (Hungary)

Tibor Kapu, Gyula Cserényi

- Kapu flew on board the Axiom Mission 4 mission to the ISS which launched in June 2025 with Cserényi training as his reserve.

June 11 – Chinese Group 4 (China)

- China announced the selection of 10 new astronauts, whose names were not revealed, in the following categories:

8 spacecraft pilots: none yet named
2 mission payload specialists: 1 from Hong Kong SAR reported to be Lai Ka-ying, 1 from Macau SAR not yet named

August 12 – Fram2 (USA)

Chun Wang, Jannicke Mikkelsen, Rabea Rogge, Eric Philips

Privately funded by mission commander Chun, Fram2 was the first spaceflight in polar orbit.

August 26 – 2024 Cosmonaut Group (Russia)

Anastasia Burchuladze, Elchin Vakhidov, Vladimir Vorozhko, Aleksandr Zherebtsov

== 2025 ==
September 22 – NASA Astronaut Group 24 – The Platypi (USA)

Ben Bailey, Lauren Edgar, Adam Fuhrmann, Cameron Jones, Yuri Kubo, Rebecca Lawler, Anna Menon, Imelda Muller, Erin Overcash, Katherine Spies.

== 2026 ==
June 26 - Vast-PAM-1 (ESA)

Adrianos Golemis.

== Commercial advances ==
The space market exceeds $330 billion today. Current estimates show the number growing to nearly $3 trillion over the next three decades. Human spaceflight is one of the sectors positioned for greatest growth. Commercial astronauts are expected to fill the gap in this transition.

Ansari X Prize

The first commercial astronauts were selected by contenders for the Ansari X PRIZE, the first nongovernmental reusable crewed spacecraft, in 2004. Among them include Starchaser Industries directors Steve Bennett (United Kingdom) and Matt Shewbridge; former NASA astronauts John Bennett Herrington (Pioneer Rocketplane), Richard Searfoss and pilot Dick Rutan (XCOR Aerospace); Canadian engineer Brian Feeney (da Vinci Project); and veteran Wally Funk from Mercury 13 (Interorbital Systems).

=== Boeing ===
Boeing hired former NASA astronaut Chris Ferguson to join the Space Exploration Team. Candidates for Boeing's astronaut corps include former NASA astronauts, commercial scientist astronauts and test pilots who have never flown in space.

=== SpaceX ===
SpaceX has employed former NASA astronauts but did not select any SpaceX employees to fly its commercial vehicles to the International Space Station.

SpaceX's former medical director at SpaceX, Anil Menon, is now a NASA astronaut selected in 2021 as a member of NASA Astronaut Group 23.

SpaceX employee Sarah Gillis (Senior Space Operations Engineer) and former employee Anna Menon (Lead Space Operations Engineer) were selected to participate in the private Polaris Dawn mission as a part of Polaris Program. Anna Menon is now a NASA astronaut candidate selected in 2025 as a member of NASA Astronaut Group 24.

=== Association of Spaceflight Professionals ===
The world's first commercial astronaut corps, the Association of Spaceflight Professionals received funding for a series of crewed spaceflight missions through the NASA Flight Opportunities Program in March 2012.

Several million dollars have been allocated for detailed spectroscopic analysis of high-altitude noctilucent cloud formations on suborbital flights using rapidly reusable, task-and-deploy spaceplanes.

The organization's commercial astronauts go through a selection process modeled after the NASA Astronaut Corps, which involves NASA astronauts. Some of its members serve as astronaut trainers themselves; some have interviewed as finalists in national space agency astronaut candidate selection campaigns. Yi So-yeon, who completed an orbital mission to the International Space Station, is a member of the organization.

=== Virgin Galactic ===
Scaled Composites and Virgin Galactic astronauts include Michael Alsbury (killed in the 2014 Virgin Galactic crash), Rob Bendall (Canada), Richard Branson, Peter Kalogiannis, Niki Lauda (Austria), Brian Maisler, Clint Nichols, Wes Persall, Burt Rutan, Peter Seiffert, Peter Siebold, Mark Stucky, and Dave Mackay.

=== Teachers in Space ===
The Teachers in Space program began in 2005. In 2012, the United States Rocket Academy announced that the program was expanding to include a broader range of participants, renaming the initiative Citizens in Space. For its first phase, Citizens in Space selected and trained ten citizen astronaut candidates to fly as payload operators, including four astronaut candidates already in training (Maureen Adams, Steve Heck, Michael Johnson, and Edward Wright). Informal educator and aerospace historian Gregory Kennedy was among those listed.

=== Copenhagen Suborbitals ===
Copenhagen Suborbitals (2008, Denmark) seeks to make Denmark the fourth nation to launch humans above the Kármán line.

=== Mars One ===
Mars One was a private initiative with claims to establish a permanent human colony on Mars by 2023. The project was led by Dutch entrepreneur Bas Lansdorp, who announced plans for the Mars One mission in May 2012.

A Mars One astronaut selection announcement was made on April 19, 2013, and started its search on April 22, 2013. By August 2013, Mars One had more than 200,000 applicants from around the world. Round Two selection results were declared on December 30, 2013, wherein a total of 1058 applicants from 107 countries were selected.

Mars One received a variety of criticism relating to medical, technical and financial feasibility. Unverified rumors claimed that Mars One was a scam designed to take as much money as possible from donors, including those participating as contestants.

In February 2019, it was reported that Mars One had declared bankruptcy in a Swiss court on January 15, 2019, and was permanently dissolved as a company.

=== Inspiration Mars ===
Inspiration Mars Foundation, an American nonprofit founded by Dennis Tito, aimed to launch a human mission to flyby Mars in January 2018, or, as the 2018 date was missed, in 2021. Flight candidates included husband and wife travel duo Jane Poynter and Taber MacCallum, who participated in the Biosphere 2 experiment.

=== Waypoint2Space ===
Waypoint2Space was granted FAA safety approval for its training services in 2014. The company works in collaboration with NASA Johnson Space Center in Houston to provide spaceflight training.

=== Truax Engineering ===
The first private firm that tried to build a suborbital space rocket, Truax Engineering, selected company employee, engineer and lifelong aviator Jeana Yeager as the first test pilot for its rocket. The project was halted in 1991 due to lack of funds.

== See also ==
- Ansari X Prize
- Canadian Arrow
- Human spaceflight
- List of astronauts by name
- List of astronauts by nationality
- List of astronauts by first flight
- List of cosmonauts
- List of private spaceflight companies
- Private spaceflight
- Robert Truax
