= Soyuz 40 =

1981 crewed flight of the Soyuz programme

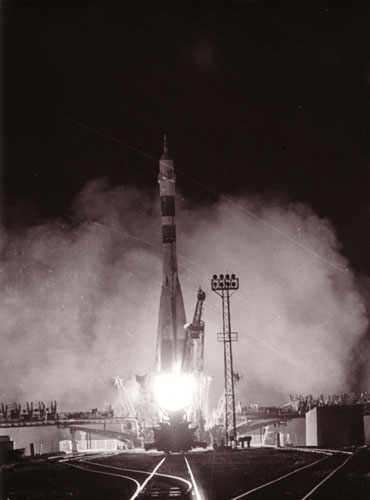
- Soyuz 40 is launched from the Baikonur Cosmodrome on 14 May 1981.
- Operator: Soviet space program
- COSPAR ID: 1981-042A
- SATCAT no.: 12454
- Mission duration: 7 days, 20 hours and 41 minutes
- Orbits completed: 124

Spacecraft properties
- Spacecraft type: Soyuz 7K-T
- Manufacturer: NPO Energia
- Launch mass: 6,800 kg (15,000 lb)

Crew
- Crew size: 2
- Members: Leonid Popov; Dumitru Prunariu
- Callsign: Dnieper

Start of mission
- Launch date: 14 May 1981, 17:16:38 UTC
- Rocket: Soyuz-U
- Launch site: Baikonur 1/5

End of mission
- Landing date: 22 May 1981, 13:58:30 UTC
- Landing site: 225 km SE of Dzhezkazgan

Orbital parameters
- Reference system: Geocentric
- Regime: Low Earth
- Perigee altitude: 198.1 kilometres (123.1 mi)
- Apogee altitude: 287 kilometres (178 mi)
- Inclination: 51.6 degrees
- Period: 89.6 minutes

Docking with Salyut 6
- Docking date: 15 May 1981, 18:50 UTC
- Undocking date: 22 May 1981, 10:37 UTC
- Time docked: 6 days, 15 hours and 47 minutes
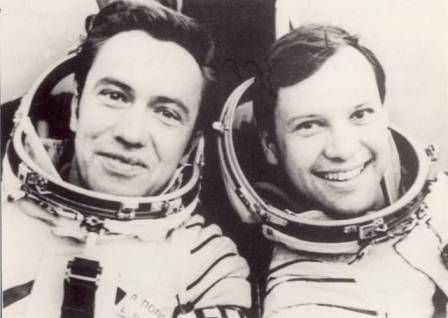
- L-R: Popov and Prunariu Soyuz programme

The Soyuz 40 mission was a 1981 Soviet crewed spaceflight and the final flight of the Soyuz 7K-T spacecraft. It was a collaboration between the Soviet Union and Romania.

== Crew ==
Prime crew
Position	Cosmonaut
Commander	Leonid Popov; Second spaceflight
Research cosmonaut	Dumitru Prunariu, Interkosmos; Only spaceflight

Backup crew
Position	Cosmonaut
Commander	Yuri Romanenko
Research cosmonaut	Dumitru Dediu, Interkosmos

== Mission parameters ==
- Mass: 6800 kg
- Perigee: 198.1 km
- Apogee: 287 km
- Inclination: 51.6°
- Period: 89.06 minutes

== Mission highlights ==
Soyuz 40 was the 16th expedition to Salyut 6 and carried the ninth international crew. It also ended the first phase of the Intercosmos program by carrying Romanian cosmonaut Dumitru Prunariu and Soviet cosmonaut Leonid Popov to the station. In all, nine Intercosmos missions were launched between 1978 and 1981.

Soyuz 40 was the last of the original Soyuz spacecraft (due to its replacement by the Soyuz-T) and the last Soyuz spacecraft to dock with Salyut 6. During the crew's stay, Prunariu studied the Earth's magnetic field. Earth observations had to be delayed until the last day of the flight, when Salyut 6 passed over Romania in daylight. During this time the crew also tested the station's orientation system.

== See also ==
- List of human spaceflights to Salyut space stations
- List of Salyut expeditions
