= Sergey Zhukov =

Sergey Zhukov may refer to:

- Sergey Zhukov (cosmonaut) (born 1956), retired Russian cosmonaut
- Sergey Zhukov (footballer) (born 1967), Soviet and Russian footballer with FC Torpedo Moscow, 1. FSV Mainz 05, FC Lokomotiv Moscow and FC Tom Tomsk
- Sergey Zhukov (ice hockey) (born 1975), Russian ice hockey player
- Sergey Zhukov (musician) (born 1976), musician with the group Ruki Vverh!
- Sergeant Sergey Zhukov, a recurring character in the television series JAG
