= Coleophora tesquorum =

Scientific classification
- Kingdom: Animalia
- Phylum: Arthropoda
- Class: Insecta
- Order: Lepidoptera
- Family: Coleophoridae
- Genus: Coleophora
- Species: C. tesquorum

Binomial name
- Coleophora tesquorum (Reznik, 1976)

Synonyms
- Multicolora tesquorum Reznik, 1976

Species of moth

Coleophora tesquorum is a moth of the family Coleophoridae. It is found in Jezkazgan, Kazakhstan.
