= Merchez =

Merchez is a surname. Notable people with the surname include:

- Désiré Mérchez (1882–1968), French swimmer and water polo player
- Marianne Merchez (born 1960), Belgian doctor
