= Oleg Blinov =

Russian cosmonaut

Oleg Vladimirovich Blinov
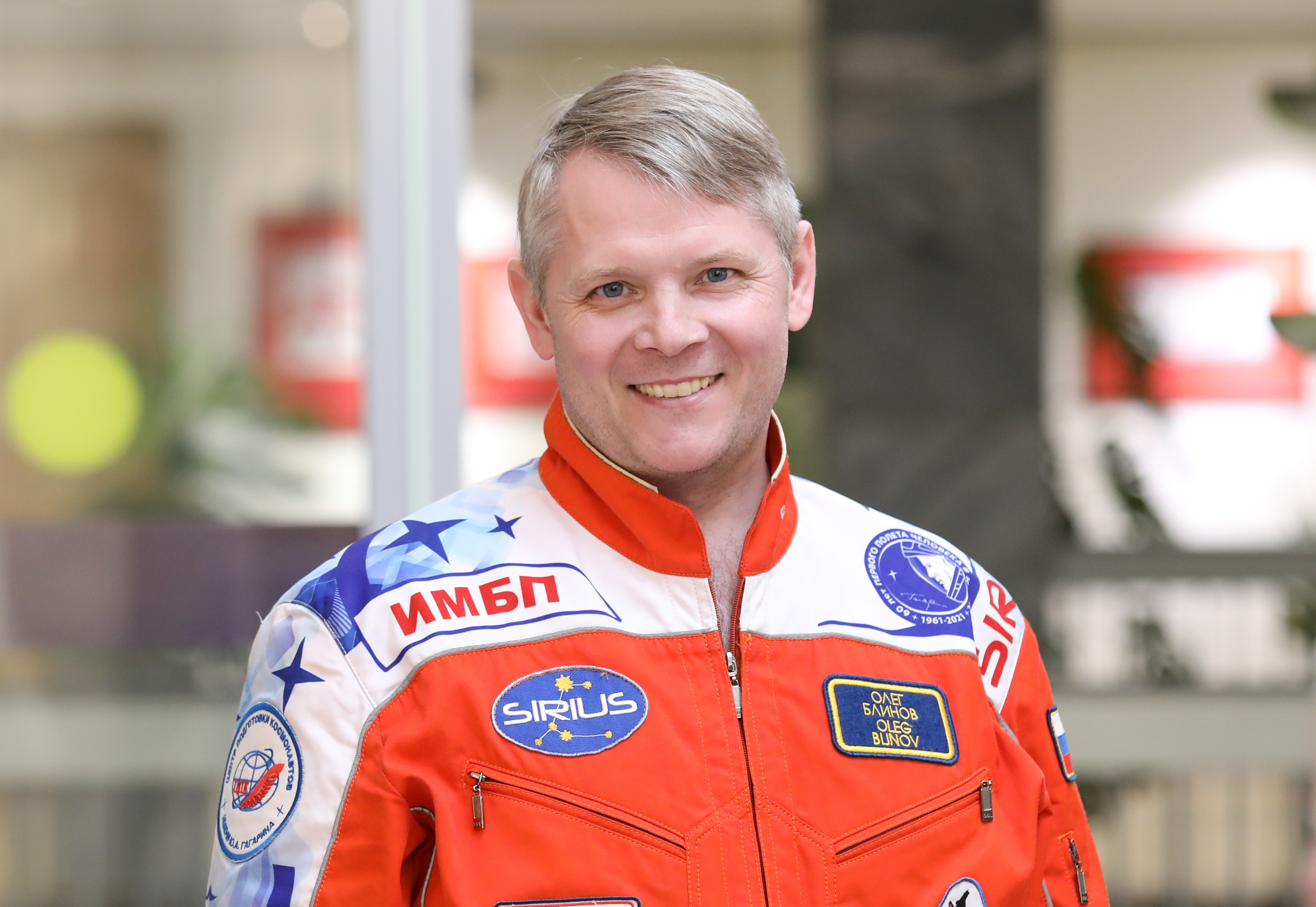
- Born: 17 August 1978 (age 48); Tatary, Kirovo-Chepetsky District, Kirov Oblast, RSFSR
- Occupation: Test cosmonaut
- Space career

Cosmonaut
- Previous occupation: Aeronautical engineer
- Status: Retired
- Rank: Lt. col., VVS reserve
- Selection: TsPK-16 Cosmonaut Group
- Retired: June 20, 2016

Oleg Vladimirovich Blinov (Russian: Олег Владимирович Блинов; born 17 August 1978 in Tatary, Kirovo-Chepetsky District, Kirov Oblast, RSFSR, USSR) is a retired Russian cosmonaut.

== Biography ==
From 1998 to 2002, Blinov served in the Russian Air Force (VVS) as a technician on an Mil Mi-8 helicopter. He obtained the rank of lieutenant colonel in the VVS. He graduated from the Vyatka State Agricultural Academy in 2001 with a mechanical engineering degree focusing on agricultural mechanization before receiving a graduate degree in aircraft engineering from the Moscow Aviation Institute in 2014. He began working for Roscosmos at the Yuri Gagarin Cosmonaut Training Center as an engineer involved in extravehicular activity in 2002, and continued in this role until his selection to the cosmonaut corps.

Blinov was selected as a cosmonaut in 2012. He began his cosmonaut training on October 26, 2012 and was appointed as a test cosmonaut on June 6, 2014. He left the corps on June 20, 2016 before having completed any spaceflight, and continues to work with Roscosmos as the director of the Vykhod simulator.
