= Li Qinglong =

Chinese astronaut

- 李庆龙
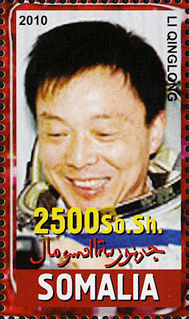
- Li Qinglong in 2010
- Born: August 1962 (age 64); Dingyuan, Anhui
- Space career

PLAAC astronaut
- Previous occupation: PLAAF fighter pilot
- Status: Retired
- Selection: Chinese Group 1 (1998)
- Missions: None
- Retired: 2014

Li Qinglong (simplified Chinese: 李庆龙; traditional Chinese: 李慶龍; pinyin: Lǐ Qìnglóng; born August 1962) is a Chinese pilot selected as part of the Shenzhou program.

== Biography ==
Li Qinglong was born in Dingyuan, Anhui province, China. In 1987 he graduated from the People's Liberation Army Air Force (PLAAF) Missile College and later the PLAAF Flight College. A fighter pilot in the PLAAF, he had accumulated 1230 flight-hours.

In November 1996, Li Qinglong and Wu Jie started training at the Russian Yuri Gagarin Cosmonauts Training Center. Along with the 12 candidates selected in 1998, they formed Group 1 of the People's Liberation Army Astronaut Corps.

In January 2003 it was reported by a Hong Kong newspaper that Chen Long would make the first manned Shenzhou flight. Then in March 2003, it was reported that Li Qinglong would make the first manned flight. It was thought that "Chen Long" was a misspelling of "Qinglong", a fact confirmed by the newspaper a couple of days before the launch of Shenzhou 5, which was flown by Yang Liwei.

Li Qinglong retired from the Astronaut Corps in 2014.
