= Sergey Moshchenko =

Sergei Ivanovich Moshchenko
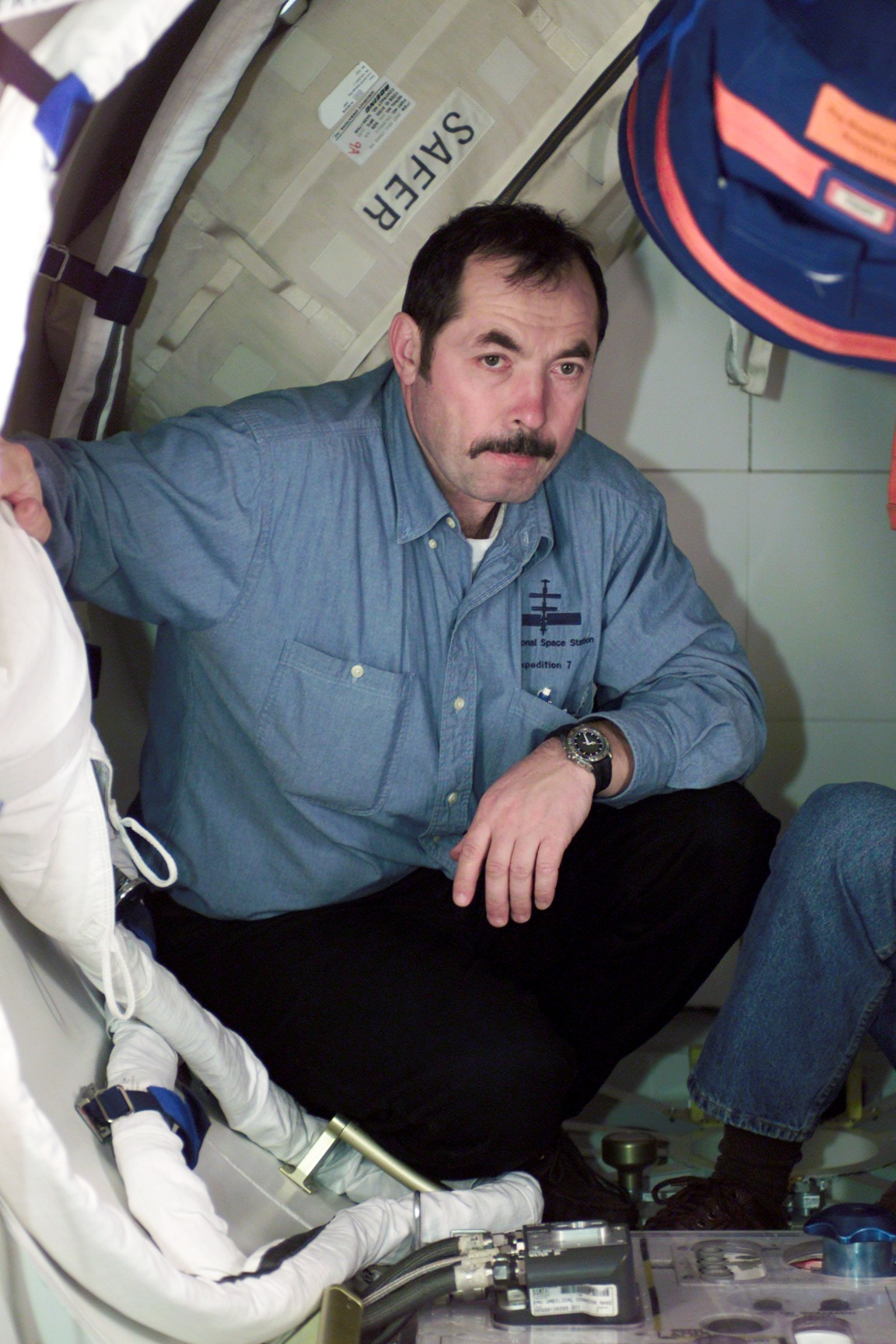
- Moshchenko in 2002
- Born: 12 January 1954 (age 72); Naro-Fominsky District, Moscow Oblast, RSFSR
- Occupation: Test cosmonaut
- Space career

Cosmonaut
- Previous occupation: Aeronautical engineer
- Status: Retired
- Rank: Senior lt., VVS reserve
- Selection: 1997 TsPK Cosmonaut Group

Sergei Ivanovich Moshchenko (Russian Cyrillic: Сергей Иванович Мощенко; born January 12, 1954, in Naro-Fominsky District, Moscow Oblast, RSFSR) is a retired cosmonaut. Moshchenko retired before being assigned to a spaceflight to the International Space Station.

== Biography ==
Moshchenko graduated from the Moscow Aviation Institute in 1980 with a degree in mechanical engineering. Although he began his studies in 1972, he was called into active duty in the Russian Air Force (VVS) from 1973 to 1975. He achieved the rank of senior lieutenant in the VVS reserve in 1984.

After graduation, Moshchenko began working as an engineer at the Khrunichev State Research and Production Space Center, working on projects related to the Salyut and Mir space stations. During his employment with Khrunichev, Moshchenko developed space-related technologies for which he has patents. He continued his work with the Khrunichev after having been selected as a cosmonaut.

Moshchenko was selected as a cosmonaut on September 19, 1997, and completed training on December 1, 1999, when he became a test cosmonaut. On October 19, 2000, Moshchenko was selected for the Expedition 7 mission to the International Space Station in 2003 alongside commander Yuri Malenchenko and flight engineer Ed Lu; however, he was removed from the mission and Aleksandr Kaleri was selected in his place on October 1, 2002. Due to the reduction in crew size due to the Space Shuttle Columbia disaster, Kaleri did not fly on this mission and only Malenchenko and Lu traveled to orbit.

Moshchenko had not been selected as a member of a subsequent resident crew on the International Space Station and retired from the cosmonaut corps on May 25, 2009.
