= Anthea Comellini =

Italian aerospace engineer and reserve astronaut

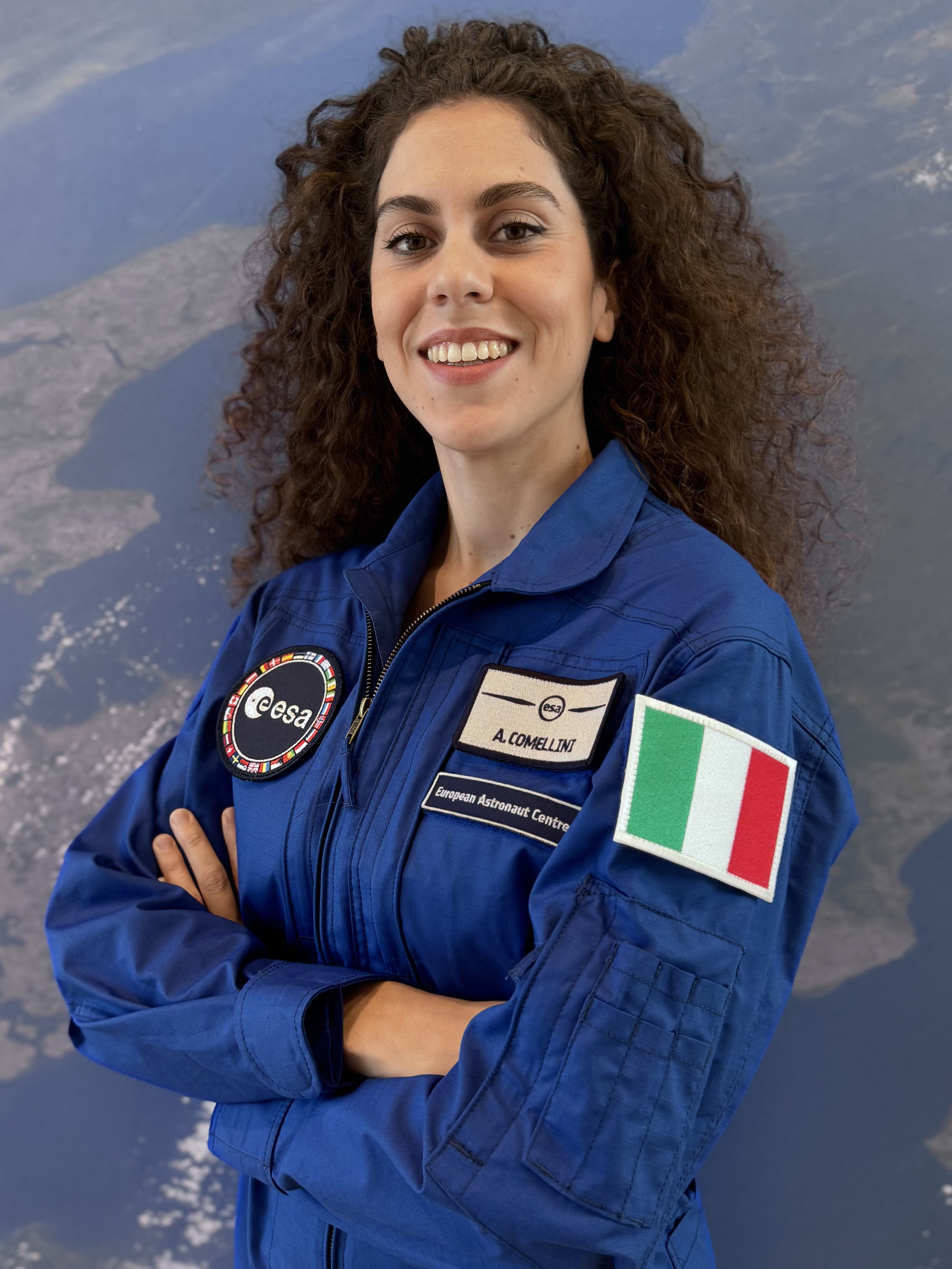
- Comellini in 2025
- Born: 1992 (age 33–34); Italy
- Education: Institut Supérieur de l'Aéronautique et de l'Espace
- Occupation: Engineer
- Scientific career
- Thesis: Vision-based navigation for autonomous rendezvous with non-cooperative targets (2021)
- Space career

ESA reserve astronaut
- Selection: 2022 ESA Group

Anthea Comellini (born 1992) is an Italian aerospace engineer and reserve astronaut. Comellini completed a PhD on space rendezvous at the Institut Supérieur de l'Aéronautique et de l'Espace, in France, with aerospace company Thales Alenia Space in 2021. She then worked in space navigation operations for the European Space Agency, and the following year, was hired for research and development at Thales Alenia Space. She was chosen as a reserve astronaut in the European Astronaut Corps in 2022.

== Early life and family ==
Anthea Comellini was born in Italy in 1992. Her mother is a seamstress and her father is an architect. Her parents named her after a character in a television series played by Andie MacDowell, as they wanted a daughter who had the same curly hair as the character and as themselves.

Comellini grew up in the town Chiari, in the Brescia province of northern Italy. She attended liceo scientifico cittadino Calini, a high school in Brescia. She initially desired to become a writer, and in high school, she won third prize for a poetry award, the Premio Montale. A competitive orienteer, she participated in the 2011 Junior World Orienteering Championships.

== Education and career ==
Comellini graduated with a bachelor's degree in aerospace engineering from the Polytechnic University of Milan in 2014. In 2017, she earned a master's degree in space engineering from the Polytechnic University of Milan, and a Diplôme d'Ingénieur from the Institut Supérieur de l'Aéronautique et de l'Espace (ISAE-SUPAERO), in Toulouse, France, as part of a double degree programme, and a master's degree from the Paris-Saclay University in signal and image processing and advanced control. She completed a PhD at ISAE-SUPAERO in partnership with an industrial partner, aerospace manufacturer Thales Alenia Space, in 2021. Her thesis proposed a solution for the "Vision-based navigation for autonomous rendezvous with non-cooperative targets". During the programme, she was a visiting researcher at a laboratory at Polytechnique Montréal, in Canada, for half a year.

After her PhD, and until 2022, Comellini was a flight dynamics engineer in the European Space Agency's mission control centre, European Space Operations Centre, located in Germany where she worked on deep-space navigation for BepiColombo, ExoMars Trace Gas Orbiter, Gaia, and Mars Express, among other missions.

In 2022, she was hired by Thales Alenia Space as an engineer in its research and development department. She was chosen as a reserve in the European Astronaut Corps in the 2022 class of astronauts. As part of the reserve, she will continue to work her full-time job as an engineer and will begin training if found necessary for a future space mission. Comellini's work at Thales Alenia Space entails control, guidance, and navigation systems for satellites.
