= Hero of the Socialist Republic of Romania =

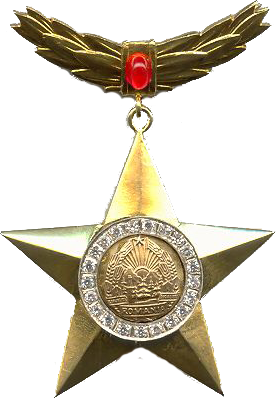
- Gold Star Medal of the Hero of the Socialist Republic of Romania
- Type: Honorary title
- Awarded for: Service to Romania and Society
- Presented by: the Socialist Republic of Romania
- Eligibility: Romanian and foreign citizens
- First award: 1971
- Final award: 1989
- Related: Hero of the Soviet Union

The title Hero of the Socialist Republic of Romania (Romanian: Erou al Republicii Socialiste România) was the highest distinction in the Socialist Republic of Romania. It was modeled on the Soviet Union's highest award, the Hero of the Soviet Union title. It was first awarded in 1971 and was awarded for service to the implementation of domestic and foreign policy.

== List of recipients (Partial List) ==
- Ionel Jora (Socialist Republic of Romania) (Officer, posthumous) 1971
- Nicolae Ceaușescu (Socialist Republic of Romania) (Politician) 1971, 1978, and 1988
- Ion Gheorghe Maurer (Socialist Republic of Romania) (Politician) 1972
- Chivu Stoica (Socialist Republic of Romania) (Politician) 1973
- Josip Broz Tito (Socialist Federal Republic of Yugoslavia) (Politician) 1972
- Juan Perón (President of Argentina) 1974
- Elena Ceaușescu (Socialist Republic of Romania) (Politician) 1981
- Dumitru Prunariu (Socialist Republic of Romania) (Romanian Cosmonaut) 1981
- Leonid Popov (Soviet Union) (Soviet cosmonaut) 1981
