= Wu Jie =

Chinese military pilot and astronaut

- 吴杰
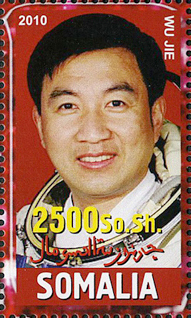
- Wu Jie on a 2010 Somalian stamp
- Born: October 26, 1963 (age 62); Zhengzhou, Henan
- Space career

PLAAC astronaut
- Previous occupation: PLAAF fighter pilot
- Status: Retired
- Selection: Chinese Group 1 (1998)
- Missions: None
- Retired: 2014

Wu Jie (simplified Chinese: 吴杰; traditional Chinese: 吳杰; pinyin: Wú Jié) is a Chinese military pilot and taikonaut selected as part of the Shenzhou program.

== Biography ==
Wu Jie was born in Zhengzhou, Henan province, China. In 1987 he graduated from the People's Liberation Army Air Force (PLAAF) Engineering College and later the PLAAF Flight College. A fighter pilot in the PLAAF, he had accumulated 1100 flight-hours.

In November 1996, Li Qinglong and Wu Jie started training at the Russian Yuri Gagarin Cosmonauts Training Center. Along with the 12 candidates selected in 1998, they formed Group 1 of the People's Liberation Army Astronaut Corps.

Before the flight of Shenzhou 5 it was thought that he or Li Qinglong would fly the mission, that was eventually flown by Yang Liwei.

Wu was then one of the six astronauts in the final training for Shenzhou 6.

Wu Jie retired from the Astronaut Corps in 2014.
