= Man in Space Soonest =

United States space program

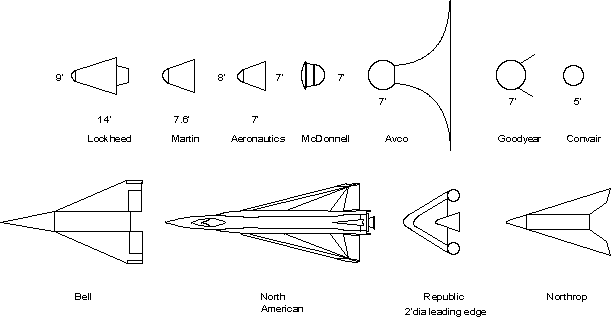
Spacecraft proposals from different companies.

Man-In-Space-Soonest (MISS) was a United States Air Force (USAF) program to put a man into outer space before the Soviet Union. It consisted of orbiting a ballistic capsule with instruments, and then progressing to primates and finally man. The Thor-Vanguard, Thor with a fluorine upper stage, and a Titan with added fluorine second and third stages were considered as launch vehicles.

The program was cancelled on August 1, 1958, and was replaced by NASA's Project Mercury. Only two men from the program would actually reach outer space. The first, Joseph A. Walker, did so two or three times (depending on the definition of the space border) in X-15 rocket plane tests in 1963. The other, Neil Armstrong, became a NASA astronaut in 1962, flew on Gemini 8 in 1966, and in 1969 on Apollo 11 becoming the first person to walk on the Moon.

== Astronaut candidates ==
MISS would have used a Thor booster, then later an Atlas, to launch a single-man spacecraft into orbit. On June 25, 1958, the Air Force announced the following nine men selected to be astronauts for the program:

- Neil A. Armstrong (1930–2012), 27, NACA. The only member of the group to join the NASA Astronaut Corps. Flew on Gemini 8 and Apollo 11 missions; performed the first docking of two spacecraft, was the first—along with Buzz Aldrin—to land on the Moon, and was the first person to set foot on the Moon.
- William B. Bridgeman (1916–1968), 42, Douglas Aircraft Company
- A. Scott Crossfield (1921–2006), 36, North American Aviation (NAA)
- Iven C. Kincheloe (1928–1958), 29, USAF
- John B. McKay (1922–1975), 35, NACA
- Robert A. Rushworth (1924–1993), 33, USAF
- Joseph A. Walker (1921–1966), 37, NACA. The first member of the group to achieve outer space according to the FAI, and to enter space twice, on two X-15 test flights.
- Alvin S. White (1918–2006), 39, NAA
- Robert M. White (1924–2010), 33, USAF. The first member of the group to achieve outer space according to the USAF.

== See also ==
- List of astronauts by selection
- Project Mercury
- Vostok Program
