= Alvin S. White =

American test pilot and mechanical engineer

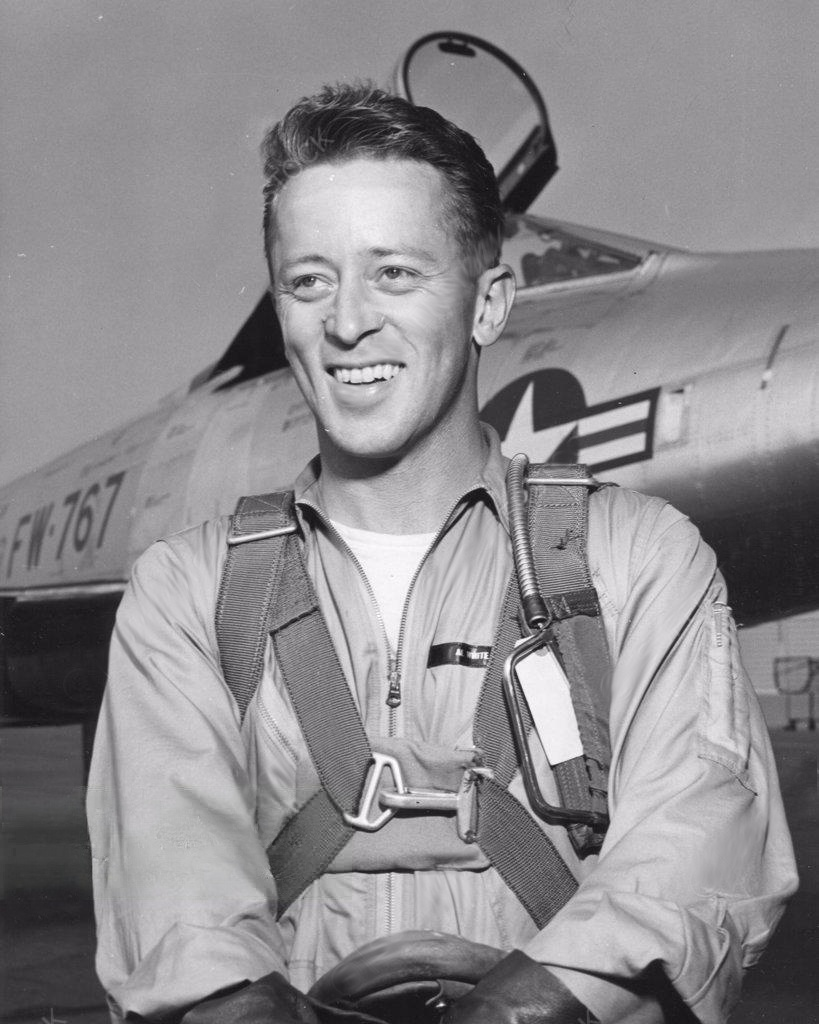
- Born: Alvin Swauger White; December 9, 1918; Berkeley, California, U.S.
- Died: April 29, 2006 (aged 87); Tucson, Arizona, U.S.
- Education: University of California, Davis; University of California, Berkeley, B.S. 1947
- Occupation: Test pilot
- Space career

USAF Test Pilot
- Selection: 1958 MISS Group
- Missions: None

Alvin Swauger White (December 9, 1918 – April 29, 2006) was an American test pilot and mechanical engineer. He flew the maiden flights of both XB-70 Valkyrie aircraft, the first 2,000 mph (3,200 km/h) flight, and all subsequent Mach 3 exploration flights.

== Biography ==
Born on December 9, 1918, to Harold H. White Sr. (1888–1974) and Ruth A. Winkleman (1894–1975) in Berkeley, California. After graduating from high school, he enrolled in the University of California, Davis in 1936 to study electrical engineering, and transferred to the campus at Berkeley two years later. He began his flying career in the Civilian Pilot Training Program, receiving his license in 1940. During World War II, he enlisted in the U.S. Army Air Forces as an aviation cadet, and graduated from training at Williams Field, Arizona, in 1942. He later flew bomber escorts and strafing missions over Europe in the P-51 Mustang with the 355th Fighter Group from D-Day through V-E Day.

After the war, White completed his Bachelor of Science degree in mechanical engineering at the UC Berkeley in 1947, and went on to become an engineering test pilot for the U.S. Air Force and North American Aviation. He participated in a variety of flight test programs over his career, including the F-86 Sabre jet, the F-100 Super Sabre series, the YF-107 and the X-15. In 1958, White was selected for the U.S. Air Force's Man in Space Soonest human spaceflight program. The program ended early due to financial and technical difficulties. In 1961, he was selected as chief test pilot for the flight test program of the XB-70 Valkyrie, the world's largest supersonic aircraft, piloting the first flights of both XB-70s and taking the aircraft through the buildup programs to flight at Mach 3. On June 8, 1966, he was the sole survivor of the mid-air collision that destroyed the XB-70 #2 prototype and killed his co-pilot, USAF Major Carl Cross (1925–1966), and noted aviator Joe Walker. White ejected from the XB-70, sustaining serious injuries, including one arm being crushed as it was caught in the clamshell-like escape capsule as it closed around him just before ejection from the aircraft.

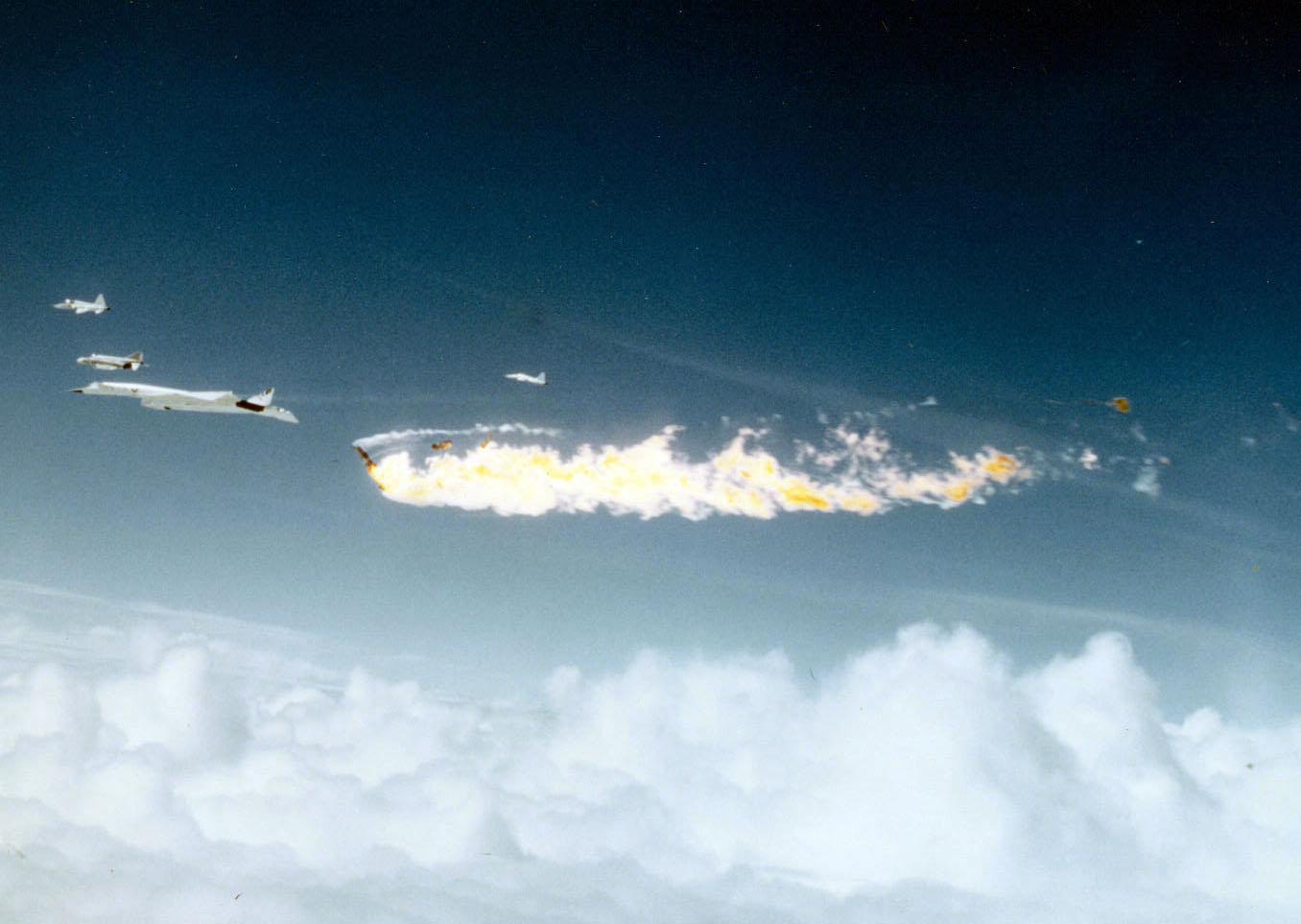
White's XB-70 – missing one of, and a portion of its second, vertical stabilizers – shortly after the collision with Walker's F-104 Starfighter, seen in flames

Later in 1966, White joined Trans World Airlines (TWA) as manager of flight operations, research and development. In 1969, he became a consultant in the field of aviation and aeronautics, working primarily as an expert witness in accident investigation litigation, requiring simulation of accident flight conditions in a comparable aircraft.

After 8,500 hours of flying time in over 125 different aircraft, he retired from the ranks of active pilots and settled in Tucson, Arizona. He died in Arizona in 2006.

== Honors ==
White's military decorations include the Distinguished Flying Cross and the Air Medal with nine oak leaf clusters. A past President and founding member of the Society of Experimental Test Pilots (SETP), White earned some of the top awards for his profession, including the Iven C. Kincheloe Award, the Octave Chanute Award, and the Harmon Trophy, which was presented by President Lyndon B. Johnson. In 1994, he was inducted into the Aerospace Walk of Honor.
