= Maurizio Cheli =

Italian test pilot and astronaut (born 1959)

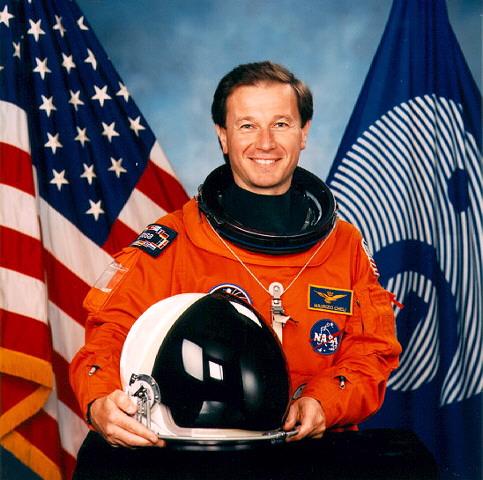
- Born: 4 May 1959 (age 67); Zocca, Italy
- Occupation: Test pilot
- Space career

ASI/ESA astronaut
- Rank: Lieutenant colonel, Italian Air Force
- Time in space: 15d 17h 41m
- Selection: 1992 ESA Group, NASA Group 14 (1992)
- Missions: STS-75

Maurizio Cheli (born 4 May 1959) is an Italian air force officer, a European Space Agency astronaut and a veteran of one NASA Space Shuttle mission.

== Life and career ==
Cheli was born on 4 May 1959 in Zocca. He attended the Italian Air Force Academy and trained as a test pilot in 1988 at the Empire Test Pilots' School, England. He was awarded the McKenna Trophy as the best student on his course, as well as the Sir Alan Cobham Award for the highest standard of flying and the Hawker Hunter Trophy for he best Preview Handling report. He studied geophysics at the University of Rome La Sapienza and earned a master's degree in aerospace engineering from the University of Houston. He then trained with the United States Air Force and was selected as an astronaut candidate by the European Space Agency in 1992. He holds the rank of lieutenant colonel in the Italian Air Force. He flew aboard STS-75 in 1996 as a mission specialist.

That same year he joined Alenia Aeronautica, and two years later he became Chief Test Pilot for combat aircraft. His last test program was for the Eurofighter Typhoon.

Maurizio Cheli has more than 380 hours of space activity and more than 4500 flying hours on more than 50 different aircraft types.

He is married to fellow former ESA astronaut Marianne Merchez.

During the 2009 World Air Games in Turin, on 12 June 2009 the SkySpark experimental aircraft piloted by Cheli logged the speed world record for its class, powered by an electric engine designed by the DigiSky, an aviation technologies firm founded by Cheli himself in 2005.
