= Dumitru Prunariu =

Romanian cosmonaut (born 1952)

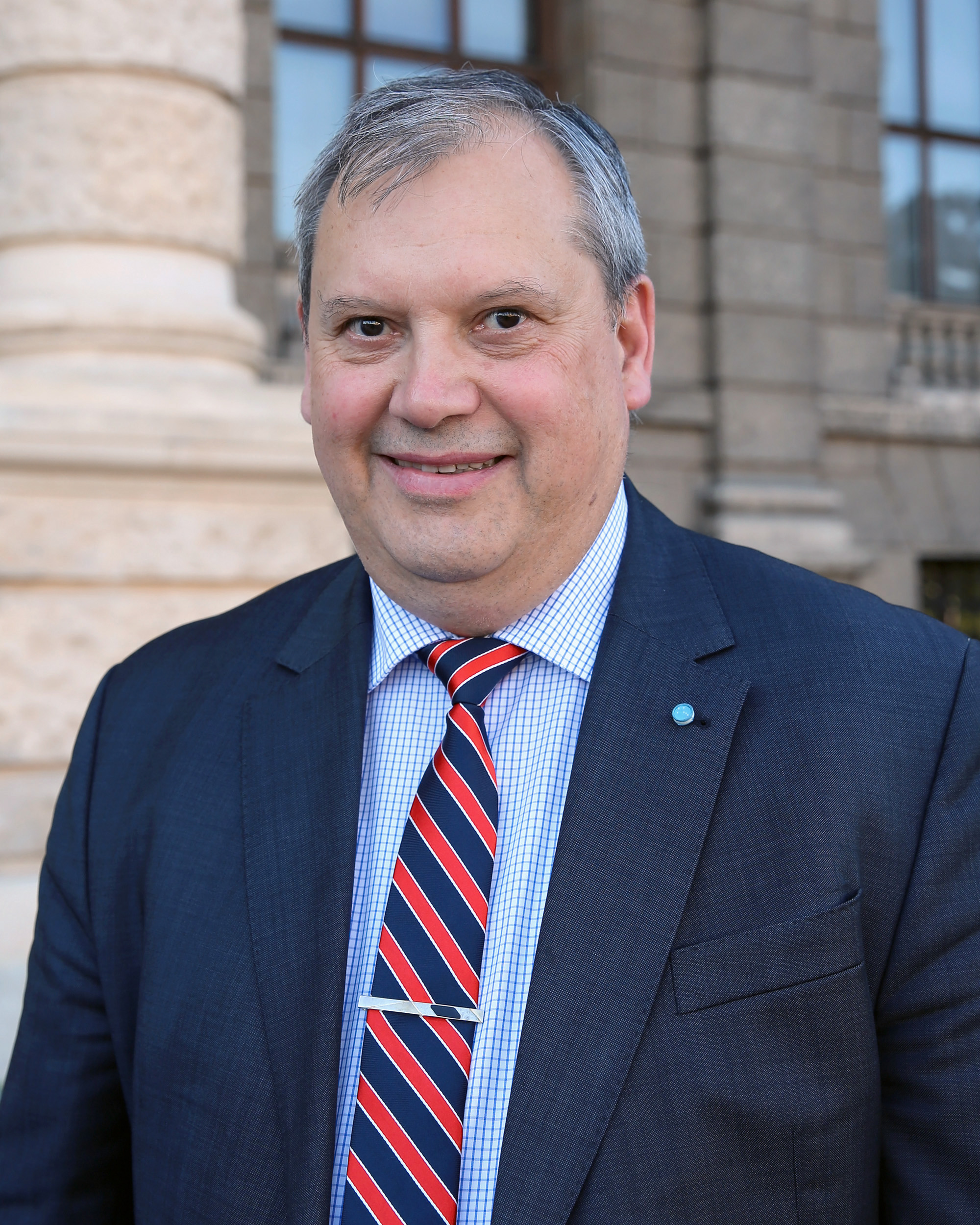
- Born: 27 September 1952 (age 74); Brașov, Romanian People's Republic
- Occupations: Aviator, engineer, and diplomat
- Spouse: Crina Prunariu
- Children: 2
- Awards: Hero of the Soviet Union; Hero of the Socialist Republic of Romania
- Space career

Intercosmos Cosmonaut
- Time in space: 7d 20h 42m
- Selection: 1978 Intercosmos Group
- Mission: Soyuz 40
- Mission insignia

Dumitru-Dorin Prunariu (Romanian pronunciation: [duˈmitru doˈrin pruˈnarju]; born 27 September 1952) is a Romanian cosmonaut. He flew in space aboard Soyuz 40 spacecraft and Salyut 6 space laboratory. He teamed with the Soviet cosmonaut Leonid Popov. The backup crew was made of Romanian candidate cosmonaut Dumitru Dediu and Soviet cosmonaut Yuri Romanenko.

== Biography ==
=== Early life and career ===
Born on 27 September 1952 in Brașov (at the time, Orașul Stalin), Romania, Prunariu graduated in 1971 from the Physics and Mathematics high school in Brașov and in 1976 from the Politehnica University of Bucharest, obtaining a degree in Aerospace Engineering.

After graduation, Prunariu started working as a licensed engineer for Industria Aeronautică Română at an aircraft assembly facility. He enrolled in the Romanian Air Force Officers Training School the following year, 1977.

=== Intercosmos program ===
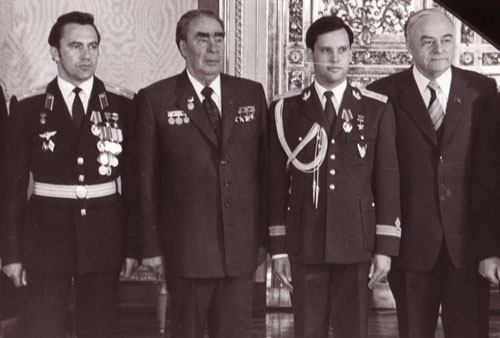
Dumitru Prunariu and Leonid Popov with Leonid Brezhnev

He was selected for spaceflight training in 1978 as a part of the Intercosmos Program. Having obtained the highest marks during three years of preparation, he was then selected for a joint space flight with the Ukrainian cosmonaut Leonid Popov. In May 1981 they completed an eight-day space mission on board Soyuz 40 and the Salyut 6 space laboratory where they completed scientific experiments in the fields of astrophysics, space radiation, space technology, space medicine, and biology.

Prunariu is the 103rd human being to fly into space.

=== Career after Intercosmos ===
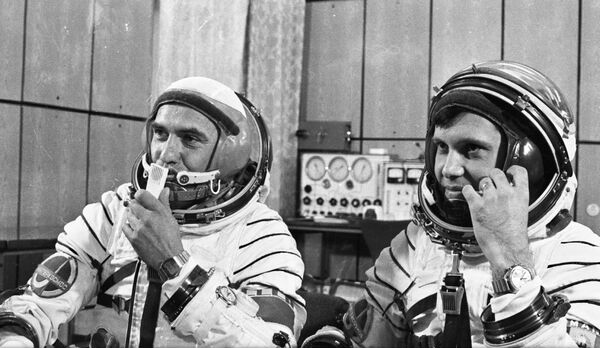
Prunariu and Popov, Soyuz 40, 14 May 1981

Since 1978 Prunariu was an active officer of the Romanian Air Force. For different periods of time Prunariu was detached within other ministries to perform civil functions. In 2007 he completely retired from the Air Force with the military rank of major general, continuing his professional activity as a civil servant. At the end of 2015, by a decree of the President of Romania, Prunariu received the 3rd star, becoming a lieutenant-general (ret.).

In January 1990 Prunariu was assigned the position of Deputy Minister to the Ministry of Transportation and Chief of the Romanian Civil Aviation Department, exercising this position for 1.5 years. In 1991 Prunariu graduated from the International Aviation Management Training Institute (IAMTI/IIFGA) located in Montreal, Canada – being after 1989 the first Romanian accomplishing a two-month training for higher managers of civil aviation institutions.

Between 1992 and 1993 Prunariu was a Co-leader of the World Bank Project on reorganization of the higher education and research system in Romania.

Since 1995 Prunariu is the Vice-President of the International Institute for Risk, Security and Communication Management (EURISC), Bucharest.

Between 1998 and 2004 Prunariu was the President of the Romanian Space Agency, and since 2000 an Associate Professor on Geopolitics within the Faculty of International Business and Economics, Academy of Economic Studies, Bucharest, Romania.

For almost two years, starting with May 2004, he was the itinerary Ambassador Extraordinary and Plenipotentiary of Romania to the Russian Federation.

In 2002 Prunariu was elected as the Chairman of the Scientific and Technical Subcommittee of the UN COPUOS for the period February 2004 – February 2006, and in 2009 he was elected the Chairman of the UN COPUOS for the period of June 2010 – June 2012, accomplishing successfully his duties.

Between 2006 and 2008 Prunariu accomplished the duties of the Director of the Romanian Office for Science and Technology to the European Commission (ROST) in Brussels.

Currently, Prunariu is working for the Romanian Space Agency as an expert within the Romanian Association for Space Technology and Industry – ROMSPACE.

In 2012 Prunariu was appointed as one of the 15 experts of the Group of Governmental Experts on outer space transparency and confidence-building measures, established by the UN General Assembly Resolution 65/68. Since 1992 Prunariu is a member of the International Academy of Astronautics, being one of the trustees of the Academy, and since 1994 a member of the Romanian National COSPAR Committee. Since 1992 he has represented the Government of Romania to the United Nations Committee on the Peaceful Uses of Outer Space (UN COPUOS) sessions. In 2014 Prunariu was elected for a three years term as the vice-chairman of the International Relations Committee of ESA.

Prunariu was also a member of the task force elaborating a report on Space Security for Europe in the framework of the European Institute for Security Studies (EUISS), issued in 2016.

=== Association of Space Explorers ===
In 1985 Prunariu joined, as one of the founding members, the Association of Space Explorers (ASE) which (as of 2015) has over 400 members who have flown into outer space from 36 countries.

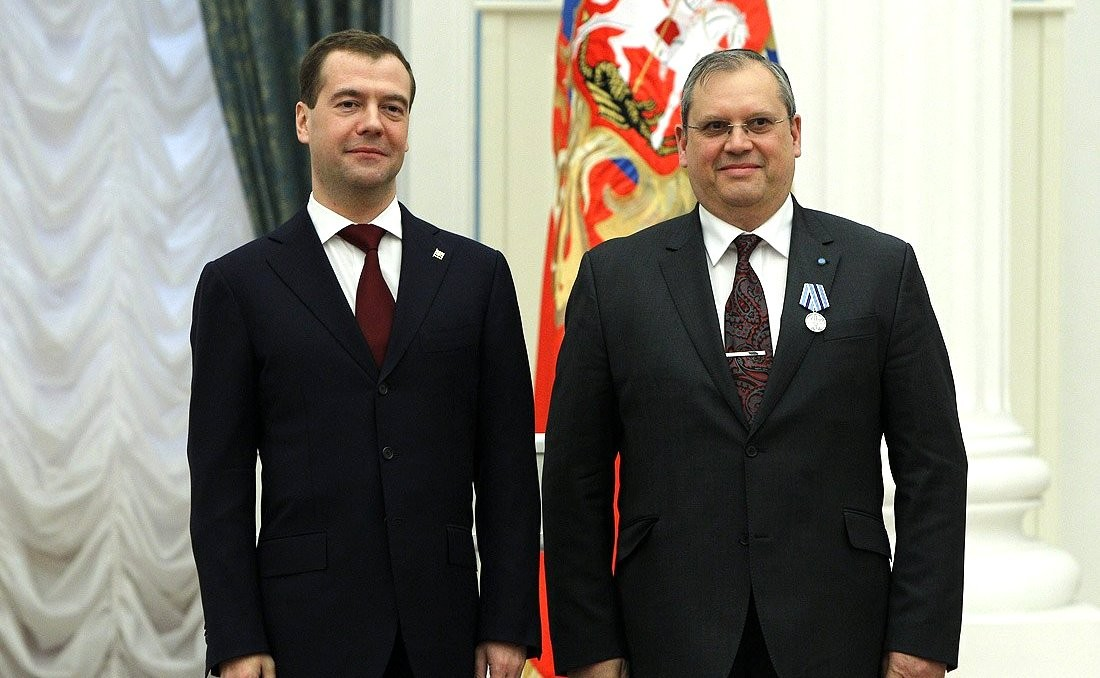
Prunariu was awarded the Medal for Merits in Space Exploration by Russian President Dmitry Medvedev at the Moscow Kremlin on 12 April 2011.

Between 1993 and 2004 he was the permanent representative of ASE at United Nations Committee on the Peaceful Uses of Outer Space (UN COPUOS) sessions.

Since 1996 Prunariu has been a member of the Executive Committee of ASE for two terms of tree years each. Since 2005 Prunariu has been a member of the ASE NEO Committee, taking part in several important activities connected with the subject, and organizing in 2007 in Romania one of the four international workshops of the ASE International Panel on Asteroid Threat Mitigation. Prunariu was the main interface in promoting the ASE International Panel's Report Asteroid Threats: A Call For Global Response at the level of the UN COPUOS as a working document for the specialized bodies of this UN Committee.

In 2016, at the 53rd session of UN STS COPUOS, on behalf of the Association of Space Explorers, Prunariu proposed the proclamation by the UN General Assembly of the International Asteroid Day to observe each year at the international level the anniversary of the Tunguska impact over Siberia, Russian Federation, on 30 June 1908 and to raise public awareness about the asteroid impact hazard. The proposal was adopted by the UN General Assembly at its 71st session in October 2016.

Asteroid Day co-founders declared Prunariu as the 1st Official Asteroid Day Ambassador for his great service and for helping protect Planet Earth from asteroid impacts.

In October 2010, at the XXIII Congress of the ASE, D. Prunariu was elected the President of the new organized Chapter of the association, ASE Europe, holding this position for 6 years. At the XXIV Congress of ASE, in September 2011 D. Prunariu was elected for a three years term the President of ASE International.

== Publications ==
Prunariu is a co-author of several books regarding space technology and space flight and has presented/published numerous scientific papers. His PhD thesis produced new developments in the field of space flight dynamics.

== Personal life ==
He is married to Crina Prunariu, a retired diplomat from the Romania's Ministry of Foreign Affairs, and has two sons and three grandchildren.

He is the voice of the robot BURN-E in the Romanian dubbed version of the animated film WALL-E made by Disney Pixar.

== Awards and honors ==
- In 1981, after completing the Soyuz 40 mission, Prunariu received the awards of Hero of the Socialist Republic of Romania and Hero of the Soviet Union.
- In 1982 Prunariu was awarded the Yuri Gagarin medal of the International Astronautic Federation.
- On 1 December 2000, Prunariu was appointed a Grand Officer of the Order of the Star of Romania.
- On 1 December 2010 he was awarded by the President of Romania the Order of Aeronautical Virtue.
- On 12 April 2011 Prunariu was awarded by the President of the Russian Federation the Medal for Merits in Space Exploration.
- On 15 November 2011, Prunariu was elected as an Honorary Member of the Romanian Academy.
- Prunariu is a Doctor Honoris Causa of several universities from Romania, Republic of Moldova and USA.
- Prunariu is an honorary citizen of several cities in Romania.
- The inner main-belt asteroid 10707 Prunariu, discovered by American astronomer Schelte Bus at the Californian Palomar Observatory in 1981, was named in his honor on 13 April 2017 (M.P.C. 103977).
