= Maksim Ponomaryov =

Russian cosmonaut

- Born: 20 February 1980 (age 46); Russia
- Space career

RKA Cosmonaut
- Status: Retired
- Time in space: -
- Selection: TsPK-14/RKKE-16 Cosmonaut Group

Maksim Vladimirovich Ponomaryov (Russian: М.В. Пономарев; born 20 February 1980), captain of Russian Air Force, and was a Russian cosmonaut, selected in 2006, who retired in 2012 after no missions to space.
