= Sergey Vozovikov =

Russian cosmonaut

Sergei Vozovikov
- Born: 17 April 1958; Alma-Ata, Kazakh Soviet Socialist Republic
- Died: 11 July 1993 (aged 35); Black Sea, Russian Federation
- Occupation: Pilot
- Space career

Cosmonaut

Sergei Yuriyevich Vozovikov (17 April 1958 – 11 July 1993) was a member of the Soviet Air Force Cosmonaut Training Group 11. His cosmonaut training was to take place from October 1, 1991, to March 6, 1992. This was cut short when he drowned on July 11, 1993, during water recovery training in the Black Sea, near Anapa, Russia.
