= Sergey Zhukov (cosmonaut) =

Russian cosmonaut (born 1956)

Sergey Aleksandrovich Zhukov
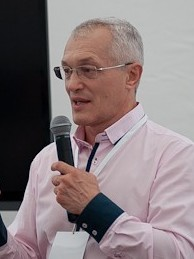
- Born: 8 September 1956 (age 70); Dzhezkazgan, Kazakh SSR, Soviet Union
- Occupation: Test cosmonaut (ret.)
- Space career

Cosmonaut
- Previous occupation: Mechanical engineer
- Status: Retired
- Selection: TsPK-13 Cosmonaut Group

Sergey Aleksandrovich Zhukov (Russian: Сергей Александрович Жуков; born 9 September 1956 in Dzhezkazgan, Kazakh SSR, USSR, now Jezkazgan, Kazakhstan) is a retired Russian cosmonaut first selected in 2003. He retired from the cosmonaut corps before completing any spaceflights.

== Biography ==
Zhukov graduated from the Bauman Moscow State Technical University in 1979 with a degree in mechanical engineering, specializing in nuclear power. In 1986, Zhukov obtained his Ph.D. from Bauman University after completing his dissertation on nuclear reactors. He has served on the board of trustees at Bauman and has over 100 scholarly publications.

In 1993, Zhukov worked with Aviation Week & Space Technology in the United States and subsequently pursued and obtained a degree in appraising intellectual property from the International Academy of Appraisal and Consulting in 2001.

After receiving his doctorate, Zhukov worked as a junior engineer at the Bauman Institute and also worked in journalism. He has held multiple positions working in the area of cosmonautics since 1991, and has served as a professor at the Bauman Institute since 1986. He has been a guest lecturer at multiple institutions, including the University of Alabama in Huntsville. He was also the head of the Moscow Space Club in 2006.

Zhukov was expected to join the cosmonaut selection of 1989; however, he was disqualified due to traces of Hepatitis B in his bloodstream. He was selected in the TsPK-13 cosmonaut selection group on 29 May 2003, and was named a test cosmonaut on 5 July 2005. Zhukov had not been selected to fly to the International Space Station at the time he announced his retirement from the cosmonaut corps on 29 April 2011.

On 4 May 2011, concurrent with his retirement from the cosmonaut corps, Zhukov began working as the executive director of the Skolkovo Foundation, which is dedicated to telecommunications and navigation systems of spacecraft.
