= Dumitru Dediu =

Romanian cosmonaut

- Born: 12 May 1942; Galati, Kingdom of Romania
- Died: 1 July 2013 (aged 71) Bucharest, Romania
- Branch: Romanian Air Force
- Rank: Lieutenant Colonel
- Education: Vasile Alecsandri National College

Dumitru Dediu (12 May 1942 in Galaţi – 1 July 2013) was a pilot in the Romanian Air Force and cosmonaut candidate that was assigned as the backup for Dumitru Prunariu.

== Biography ==
Dumitru Dediu was born on May 12, 1942 , in the city of Galați, receiving the name Mitică Dediu at birth. He studied at the Vasile Alecsandri National College in Galați, from which he graduated in 1961. He then attended the "Traian Vuia" Aviation Officers School in Mediaș and later the Military Technical Academy in Bucharest, obtaining a diploma in electronics engineering.

In 1978, Dediu was selected as the backup for Dumitru Prunariu for the Soyuz 40 mission. He served in the Romanian Army and lived in Bucharest.

He died in early July 2013 after suffering from Alzheimer's disease and Parkinson's disease. He was buried on July 11, 2013.
