= Valeriy Makrushin =

Soviet cosmonaut

Valeriy Grigoryevich Makrushin
- Валерий Григорьевич Макрушин
- Born: January 14, 1940; Saidabad, Uzbek SSR, Soviet Union
- Died: 2003
- Occupation: Engineer
- Space career
- Status: Retired
- Selection: Almaz Engineer Cosmonaut Group 1 (1972)
- Missions: TKS-1 (cancelled), Salyut 7/TKS-2 (cancelled)

Valeriy Grigoryevich Makrushin (Russian: Валерий Григорьевич Макрушин; 14 January 1940, Saidabad, Uzbek SSR, Soviet Union (now in Uzbekistan) – 2003) was a cosmonaut for the Soviet Union.

== Soviet space program ==
Makrushin joined the Chelomey Design Bureau after graduating from the Leningrad Institute of Aviation Instrumentation in 1963. He was recruited to a cosmonaut team on March 22, 1972, and was one of the first cosmonauts selected from this design bureau. He became the head of the Chelomey OKB-52 Mashinostroyeniya cosmonaut team until it was disbanded on April 8, 1987. Makrushin then worked on the Almaz military program with the design bureau until his retirement.
