= Michal Fulier =

Michal Fulier (Český Těšín, Moravia, Czechoslovakia 20 February 1955 - ) Slovak pilot, cosmonaut, colonel.

== Biography ==
Fulier received a diploma at the Military Flying Institute at Košice in 1974. He gained a higher leader position at the Slovakian Military Academy.

=== Cosmonaut ===
Fulier travelled to Star City and was trained as a cosmonaut from 2 March 1998 at the Yuri Gagarin Cosmonaut Training Center. He did not fly, because Ivan Bella was chosen instead of him, but he was a backup for the Soyuz TM-29 discovery spaceflight. He left the base on 28 February 1999.
