= Marianne Merchez =

- Born: 25 November 1960 (age 65); Uccle, Belgium
- Occupation: Medical Doctor
- Space career

ESA astronaut
- Status: Retired
- Selection: 1992 ESA Group
- Missions: None

Marianne Merchez (born 25 October 1960 in Uccle) is a Belgian doctor from the Catholic University of Louvain and a former European Space Agency astronaut. She is certified in aerospace medicine and in industrial medicine, and she is also a professional pilot (holds a Belgian Air Transport Pilot License from Civil Aviation School, former co-pilot Boeing 737).

She is married to former Italian ESA astronaut Maurizio Cheli with whom she co-authored Tutto in un istante: le decisioni che tracciano il viaggio di una vita.
