= Jezkazgan =

City in Kazakhstan

Zhezkazgan: Жезқазған (Kazakh); Жезказган (Russian)
- City
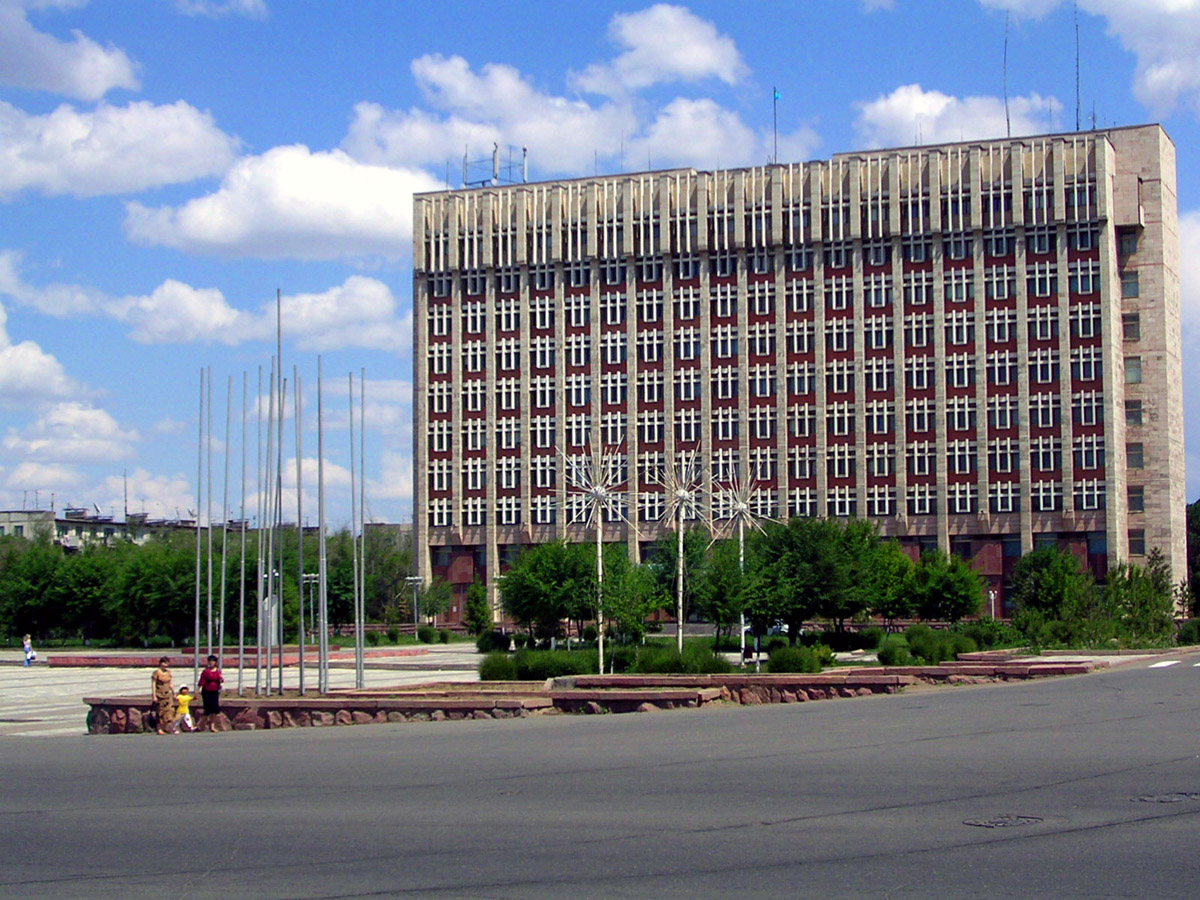

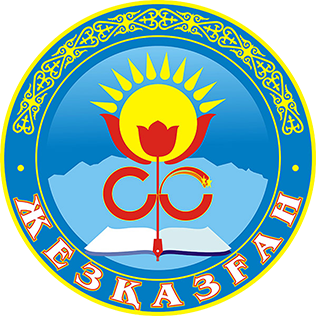
- Seal

- Location in Kazakhstan
- Coordinates: 47°47′0″N 67°42′0″E
- Region: Ulytau Region
- Founded: 1938

Government
  - Akim (mayor): Shayjanov Kairat Abdullayevich
- Elevation: 300 m (980 ft)

Population (2009)
  - City: 86,227
  - Urban: 90,661
- Time zone: UTC+5
- Postal code: 200000
- Area code: +7 7102
- Website: http://www.jezkazgan.kz

Jezkazgan (Note: Kazakh: Жезқазған, romanized: Jezqazğan, pronounced [ʒʲez.qʰɑzʁɑ́n]; Russian: (Д)жезказган, romanized: (D)žezkazgan, pronounced [(d)ʐɨskɐzˈgan]) (also spelled Zhezkazgan) is a city and the administrative centre of Ulytau Region, Kazakhstan. Its urban area includes the neighbouring mining town of Satpayev, for a total city population of 148,700. Jezkazgan's population was 86,227 (2009 census results); 90,001 (1999 census results).

55% of Zhezqazghan's population are Kazakhs and 30% Russians, with smaller minorities of Ukrainians, Germans, Chechens and Koreans.

== Geography and climate ==
Zhezqazghan is situated by river Karakengir, in the heart of the Kazakh Uplands. A reservoir was built on the river at the time of the Kazakh SSR. The city is near the geographic center of Kazakhstan. It has an extremely continental cold semi-arid climate (Köppen BSk); it features hot and somewhat long summers, very cold winters, and very short transitional seasons. Rain is frequent but never heavy and monthly rainfall has never reached 100 millimetres (4 in). The average temperature ranges from 24.4 °C (75.9 °F) in July to −13 °C (8.6 °F) in January, whilst extremes ranges from 43 °C (109.4 °F) in June 1988 to −41.1 °C (−42.0 °F) in February 1951.

Climate data for Zhezqazghan (1991–2020, extremes 1948-present)
Month	Jan	Feb	Mar	Apr	May	Jun	Jul	Aug	Sep	Oct	Nov	Dec	Year
Record high °C (°F)	5.0 (41.0)	9.0 (48.2)	27.4 (81.3)	34.2 (93.6)	39.4 (102.9)	43.0 (109.4)	45.2 (113.4)	42.4 (108.3)	39.9 (103.8)	30.5 (86.9)	22.0 (71.6)	11.6 (52.9)	45.2 (113.4)
Mean daily maximum °C (°F)	−8.9 (16.0)	−7.1 (19.2)	2.0 (35.6)	16.4 (61.5)	24.0 (75.2)	29.9 (85.8)	31.4 (88.5)	30.0 (86.0)	23.1 (73.6)	14.1 (57.4)	2.0 (35.6)	−6.2 (20.8)	12.6 (54.7)
Daily mean °C (°F)	−13.4 (7.9)	−12.3 (9.9)	−3.4 (25.9)	9.4 (48.9)	16.7 (62.1)	22.7 (72.9)	24.3 (75.7)	22.6 (72.7)	15.1 (59.2)	6.5 (43.7)	−3.1 (26.4)	−10.7 (12.7)	6.2 (43.2)
Mean daily minimum °C (°F)	−18.3 (−0.9)	−17.7 (0.1)	−8.3 (17.1)	2.7 (36.9)	8.7 (47.7)	14.4 (57.9)	16.6 (61.9)	14.5 (58.1)	7.0 (44.6)	−0.2 (31.6)	−7.8 (18.0)	−15.4 (4.3)	−0.3 (31.5)
Record low °C (°F)	−40.0 (−40.0)	−41.1 (−42.0)	−36.1 (−33.0)	−17.8 (0.0)	−6.6 (20.1)	−2.2 (28.0)	2.8 (37.0)	0.0 (32.0)	−11.4 (11.5)	−21.0 (−5.8)	−37.2 (−35.0)	−40.0 (−40.0)	−41.1 (−42.0)
Average precipitation mm (inches)	16.0 (0.63)	15.4 (0.61)	16.4 (0.65)	17.5 (0.69)	20.2 (0.80)	17.3 (0.68)	17.7 (0.70)	10.1 (0.40)	5.0 (0.20)	14.1 (0.56)	18.1 (0.71)	16.0 (0.63)	183.8 (7.26)
Average extreme snow depth cm (inches)	11 (4.3)	15 (5.9)	7 (2.8)	0 (0)	0 (0)	0 (0)	0 (0)	0 (0)	0 (0)	0 (0)	1 (0.4)	5 (2.0)	15 (5.9)
Average rainy days	1	2	4	6	9	8	8	5	4	6	5	2	60
Average snowy days	17	13	7	2	0.3	0	0	0	0.03	2	8	14	63
Average relative humidity (%)	78	76	75	56	48	40	41	40	43	60	76	79	59
Source: погода и климат

== History ==
The city was created in 1938 in connection with the exploitation of the rich copper deposits. In 1973, a large mining and metallurgical complex was constructed to the southeast to smelt the copper that until then had been sent elsewhere for processing. Other metal ores mined and processed locally are manganese and iron. Also in 1973, the city became the administrative center of the newly formed Dzhezkazgan Oblast, created out of Karaganda Oblast. In 1997, Dzhezkazgan (at this point Jezkazgan) Oblast was dissolved and the city became part of Karaganda Oblast once again. On 16 March 2022, It was announced by Kazakh President Kassym-Jomart Tokayev that Jezkazgan would become the administrative center of the new Ulytau Region. His decree came into force on 8 June 2022, thus making Zhezqazghan the administrative center of a Region once again.

During the Soviet era, Zhezqazghan was the site of a Gulag labor camp, Kengir, mentioned in Aleksandr Solzhenitsyn's book The Gulag Archipelago, and Alexander Dolgun's "An American In The Gulag", and the period of forced resettlement of Koreans from the Russian Far East.

== Industry ==
Today the city is the headquarters of the copper conglomerate Kazakhmys, the city's main employer. The company has subsidiaries in China, Russia and the United Kingdom and is listed on the London Stock Exchange. There is a power station, Kazakhmys Power Plant, with generation capacity of 207 MW and a 220-meter-tall main chimney.

== Transport ==
Zhezqazghan has a rail line to the major city Karaganda.

Zhezqazghan is connected by road to Karaganda via European route E018 and Kyzylorda and Arkalyk via European route E123. The city is accessible by air via the Zhezkazgan Airport.

== Soyuz emergency landings ==
The Soyuz 33 spacecraft returning cosmonauts from outer space landed in the remote flat countryside surrounding Jezkazgan in 1979. The Baikonur Cosmodrome lies 400 kilometres (250 mi) to the southwest and, by tradition, every cosmonaut plants a tree on Jezkazgan's Seyfullin-Boulevard to mark his or her safe return from space.

Again on 11 October 2018, the Soyuz MS-10/56S landed near Jezkazgan when a booster failed during launch.

Luna 16's samples from the Moon returned close to here on 24 September 1970.

== Economical and ecological challenges ==
Zhezkazgan is a monocity. The city is economically unstable since the city functions only because of one enterprise (resource), which constrains its development. Zhezkazgan has a great potential to become the logistics center of Kazakhstan, as it connects North and South, West, and East. Raw materials and people can be transported more efficiently through the Zhezkazgan via transit. But infrastructure and roads do not allow it. The profit of Zhezkazgan is mainly spent on the development of such large cities as Nur-Sultan, Almaty, Karaganda, etc. And a small percentage is used by Zhezkazgan itself. Monotowns are very dependent on their enterprise and price fluctuations in the world market. Changes in these aspects can lead to severe economic problems in the city. Civil servants have understood this and are trying to create and develop different sources of income. For example, “Zhezkazgan-Beyneu” was built to link Europe and the Persian Gulf and export products. The railway line connects West and East, North and South, creating an opportunity for tourists to visit Zhezkazgan. Investments must also be made in green technologies and methods to meet international standards.

In Zhezkazgan, falling water levels, poor drinking water quality, and air pollution damage the health of urban residents and the environment. According to KAZHYDROMET RMK, air pollution in Zhezkazgan is very high. And the Kengir reservoir has class 5 pollution, which is the highest indicator. Sulfurous anhydride, carbon monoxide, nitrogen oxide in a gaseous and liquid state can be found in huge quantities in the atmosphere. But the amount of these harmful gases is becoming less and less every year. For example, the emission of these gases decreased by 33.7% in the period 2012-2016. The factories in Zhezkazgan are located in the South, West, and East of the city. In the area of these plants, you can find a high concentration of inorganic dust (which contains sulfuric copper, lead sulfide), nitrogen oxide, sulfur dioxide, carbon monoxide, coal dust, parts of zinc, lead, copper and aluminum, wood dust, hydrogen sulfide, carbon-sulfur, etc. Mostly people from the eastern and southern parts of the city suffer from this the most. The factories are located very close to the town, which violates international sanitary and environmental standards. The farthest factory is located 4900 meters, and the closest one is 500 meters from the city. This pollutes the water, air, soil of the earth and causes disease among residents.

== People associated with Jezkazgan ==
- Pyotr Klimuk, cosmonaut
- Kaisar Nurmagambetov, flatwater canoer
- Vitaliy Savin, former Soviet athlete
- Oleg Yankovsky, Russian actor
- Sergei Zhukov, Russian cosmonaut
