= Mir EO-23 =

Twenty-third expedition to Mir space station

- Mission type: Mir expedition

Expedition
- Space station: Mir
- Began: 10 February 1997
- Ended: 5 August 1997
- Arrived aboard: Soyuz TM-25; Linenger: STS-81; Space Shuttle Atlantis; Foale: STS-84; Space Shuttle Atlantis
- Departed aboard: Soyuz TM-25; Linenger: STS-84; Space Shuttle Atlantis; Foale: STS-86; Space Shuttle Atlantis

Crew
- Crew size: 3
- Members: Vasily Tsibliyev; Aleksandr Lazutkin; Jerry Linenger* (February–May); Colin Michael Foale† * - transferred from EO-22 † - transferred to EO-24
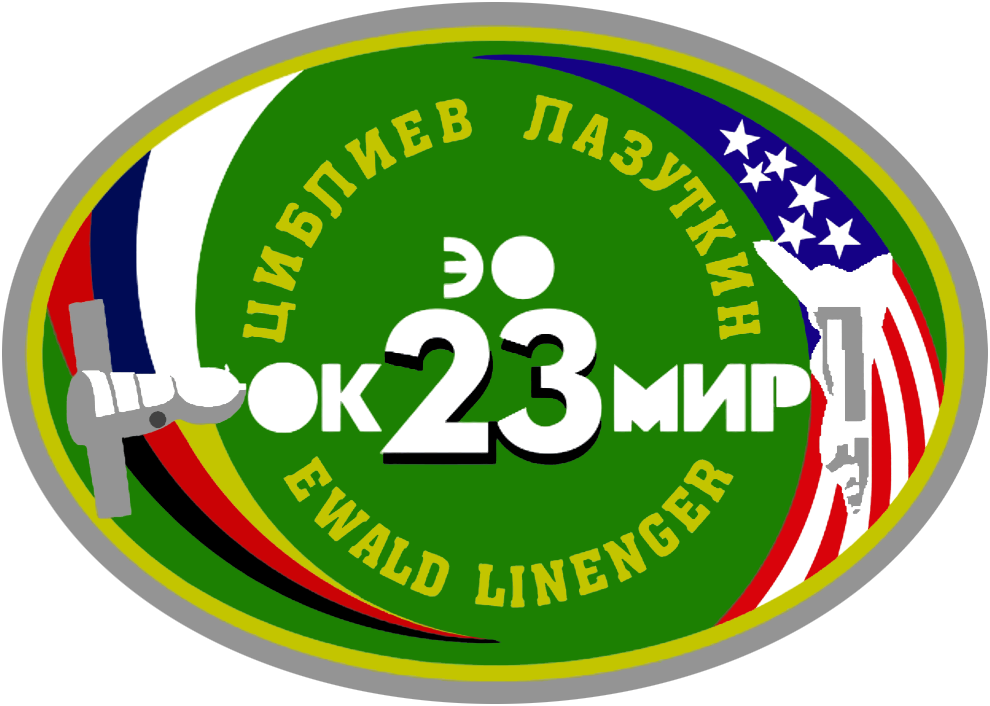
- Long-term Mir expeditions

Mir EO-23 was the 23rd long-duration mission to Russia's Mir space station. It is notable for both the fire that occurred during the mission, and the crash that caused one of the station's modules to be permanently sealed off.

== Crew ==
This mission was part of the Shuttle-Mir Program, in which three American astronauts flew aboard the station during Mir EO-23.

Position	First Part (February 1997 to May 1997)	Second Part (May 1997 to August 1997)
Commander	(Russia) Vasily Tsibliyev; Second and last spaceflight	
Flight Engineer 1	(Russia) Aleksandr Lazutkin; Only spaceflight	
Flight Engineer 2	(United States) Jerry Linenger; Second spaceflight	(United Kingdom) (United States) Michael Foale; Fourth spaceflight

Note: (Germany) Reinhold Ewald Joined the Soyuz TM-24 crew on the way home from Mir, after launching with Soyuz TM-25 crewmembers Vasily Tsibliyev and Aleksandr Lazutkin at the start of Mir EO-23, Foale remained aboard Mir as part of EO-24 crew after the end of EO-23.

== Fire ==
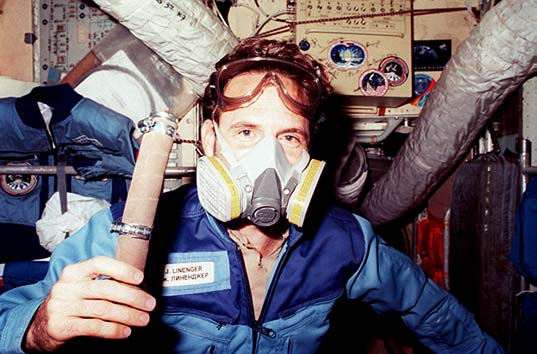
Astronaut Jerry Linenger wearing a respirator mask during repairs to the leaky coolant system. Mir

On February 24, 1997 a backup solid-fuel oxygen canister caught fire in the Kvant-1 module. The fire spewed molten metal, and the crew was concerned that it could melt through the hull of the space station. Smoke filled the station, and the crew donned respirators to continue breathing, although some respirators were faulty and did not supply oxygen. After burning for fourteen minutes and using up three fire extinguishers, the fire died out. The smoke remained thick for forty-five minutes after the fire was extinguished. After the respirators ran out of oxygen and the smoke began to clear the crew switched to using filter masks.

== Collision ==
On June 24, 1997 a manual docking test using the uncrewed Progress M-34 cargo vessel was attempted. The vessel, loaded with waste detached from the space station and Cosmonaut Vasily Tsibliyev took manual control. As he steered the craft back to the station he lost control due to a miscalculation in the mass of waste loaded onto the cargo vessel, and it crashed into the Spektr module, damaging a solar panel and puncturing Mir's hull. The puncture created a leak, and the crew was able to seal off the Spektr module from the rest of the station by cutting the air and power cables between the sections and fitting a hatch cover over the entrance.

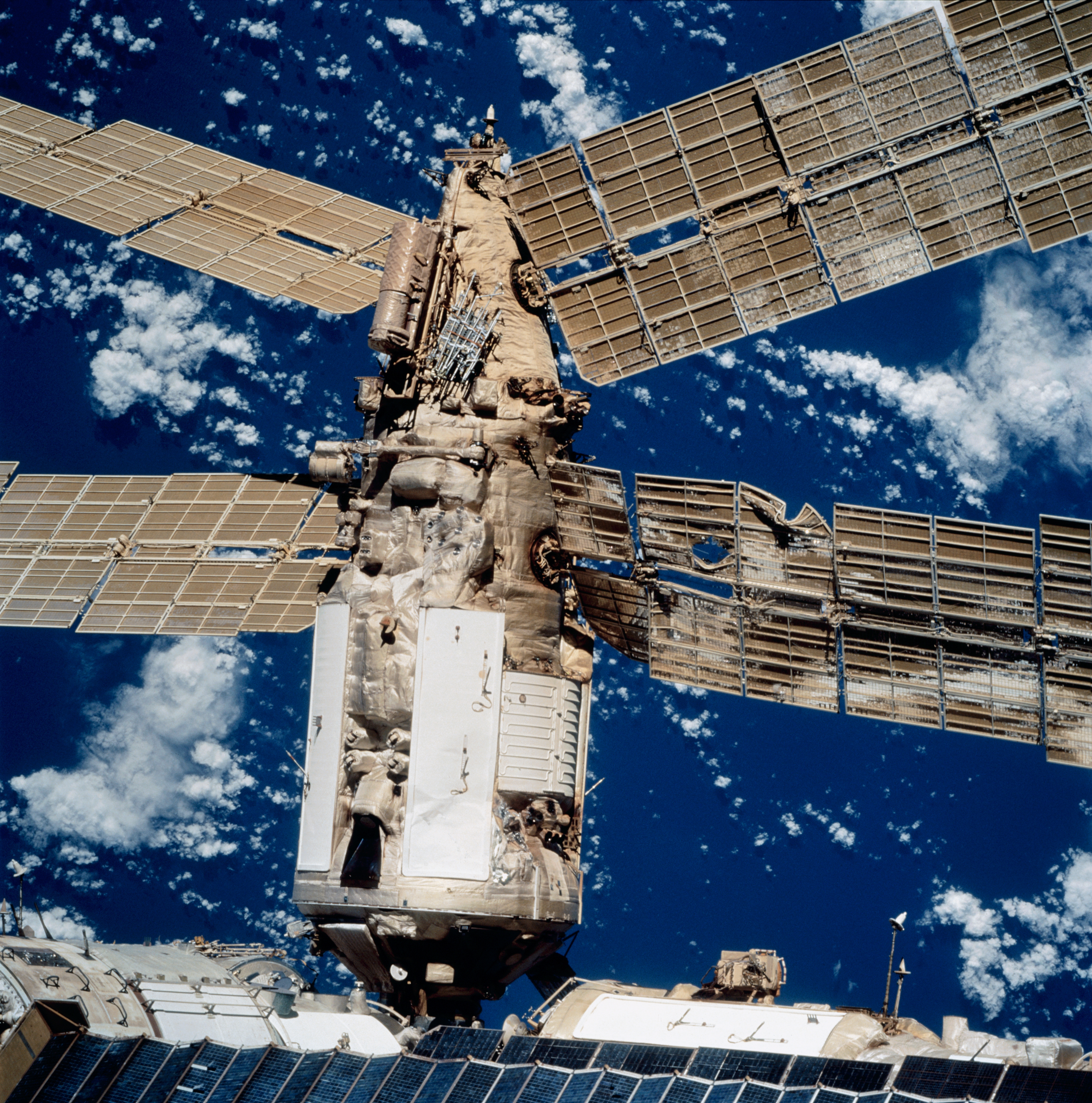
Damaged solar arrays on Spektr module following a collision with an unmanned Progress spacecraft.

The station was tumbling, and power went out onboard. Communications with Moscow were also down. The docked Soyuz TM-25 craft was used to stabilize the station. For the next few days the crew worked by torchlight to restore functionality. The cooling system was ineffective with such low power, and temperature in the station soared.

Supplies on Progress M-35, launched on July 5, contained an apparatus that could be used to restore power from the remaining functional solar panels on Spektr. A spacewalk was planned to carry out this repair, but on July 12 Commander Tsibliyev developed a heart arrhythmia and was ordered to take a combination of heart medication and tranquilizers. The repair was postponed until Mir EO-24.

== See also ==
- 1997 in spaceflight
