= Aleksandr Lazutkin =

Russian cosmonaut (born 1957)

- Александр Лазуткин
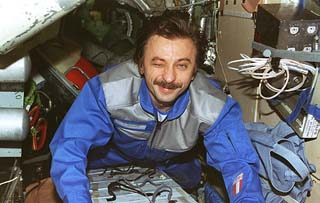
- Born: 30 October 1957 (age 68); Moscow, Soviet Union
- Occupation: Flight engineer
- Space career

Roscosmos cosmonaut
- Status: Retired
- Time in space: 184d 22h 07m
- Selection: 1992
- Missions: Soyuz TM-25 (Mir EO-23)
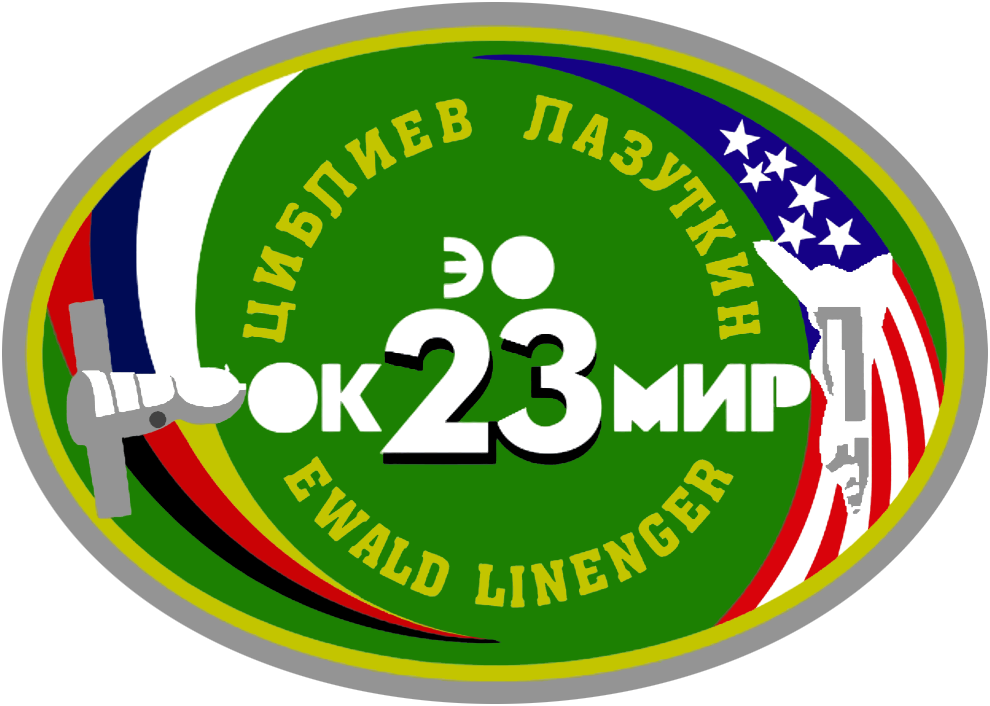
- Mission insignia
- Aleksandr Lazutkin's voice recorded October 2012

Aleksandr Ivanovich Lazutkin (Russian: Александр Иванович Лазуткин; born October 30, 1957) is a former Russian cosmonaut.

== Life and career ==
Lazutkin attended the Moscow Aviation Institute and received a degree in mechanical engineering. He was selected as a cosmonaut on March 3, 1992. His first spaceflight was Soyuz TM-25, where he served as the flight engineer.

Lazutkin has stated that Russian cosmonauts were given cognac for extended missions in space.

=== 1997 Progress supply mission ===
Lazutkin was aboard the Mir Space Station when a collision occurred with the uncrewed Progress M34, its supply craft, which was piloted by Vasily Tsibliyev while on the Mir. The collision, considered the worst in the history of the space age, knocked out Spektr's solar panels and caused the Mir to lose alignment with the sun, resulting in a loss of power. It also caused the cabin to decompress.

Quick action by the three crew members managed to avert immediate disaster. Lazutkin and fellow crew member Michael Foale quickly severed the connecting cables with the module and sealed off the hatches to the module, saving the rest of the station. Lazutkin successfully cut some of the wires connecting the Mir and the Spektr using a small dinner knife. A few days after the collision, Tsibliyev and Lazutkin were ordered to attempt to repair the Mir, while Foale was ordered to the Soyuz-TM escape pod. The station was eventually secured safely.

== See also ==
- List of Heroes of the Russian Federation
