= Vika oxygen generator =

Backup life support system on Mir and the ISS

Vika or TGK is an oxygen generating system for spaceflight. It is a SFOG, or solid-fuel oxygen generator, a kind of chemical oxygen generator. It has been used on the retired Mir space station and the International Space Station. It was originally developed by Roscosmos to supplement the Elektron oxygen system on Mir. A Vika module, also known as a "candle", contains about one liter of lithium perchlorate and can provide oxygen for one person for 24 hours.

After being adopted for use on the ISS, it had the NASA name SFOG, but they also sometimes use the Russian acronym TGK.

== Vika on Mir ==
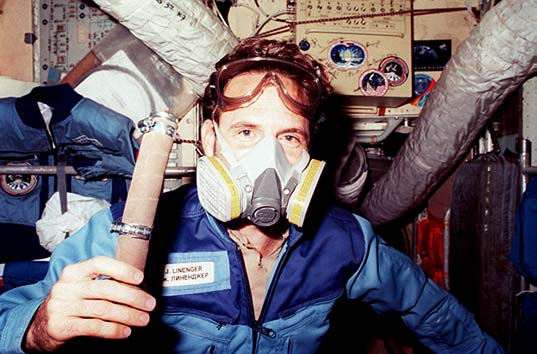
Astronaut Jerry Linenger wearing a respirator mask following the 1997 fire aboard Mir from an SFOG fire

Vika was used on Mir when more than three people were on board. Vika needs a supply of canisters to work, which must be flown into space. An example of this is Progress M-34, which carried 60 canisters to Mir in 1997 along with other cargo. If Vika and Elektron stopped working, the station would have to rely on a limited supply of bottled oxygen.

The fire was a "raging blowtorch" ..

—Mir crewmember onboard during the fire

In February 1997 a Vika chemical oxygen generator failed on Mir in the Kvant-1 module. It caught fire and spewed a torch-like jet of a molten metal and sparks across one of the Mir space station modules, burning for around 14 minutes and blocking the escape route to the docked Soyuz spacecraft. The fire was eventually extinguished, and the crew was not harmed. A definitive cause of the accident was not determined because the fire destroyed the device. It was suspected that a torn piece of rubber glove worn during assembly likely contaminated the canister. Despite this incident, NASA decided it was still the best supplemental oxygen system available, and supported its use on the then-upcoming ISS. The US and Russia worked together to improve the safety of the system before using it on the new space station.

== Vika on ISS ==
A backup to the temperamental Elektron system used on both the ISS and Mir is the Vika solid-fuel oxygen generator (SFOG), which contains a replaceable cartridge – a thin-walled steel tube with a three-part block of oxygen-releasing mixture based on lithium perchlorate. Two parts are tablets of the chemical mixture and the third one is the igniter tablet with a flash igniter. The igniter is struck by a firing pin when the device is activated. One cartridge releases 600 litres (160 US gal) of oxygen and burns for 5–20 minutes at 450–500 °C (842–932 °F). The oxygen is cooled and filtered to remove dust and odours, and released into the space station atmosphere.

== See also ==
- Life-support system
