= Mir =

Soviet/Russian space station (1986–2001)

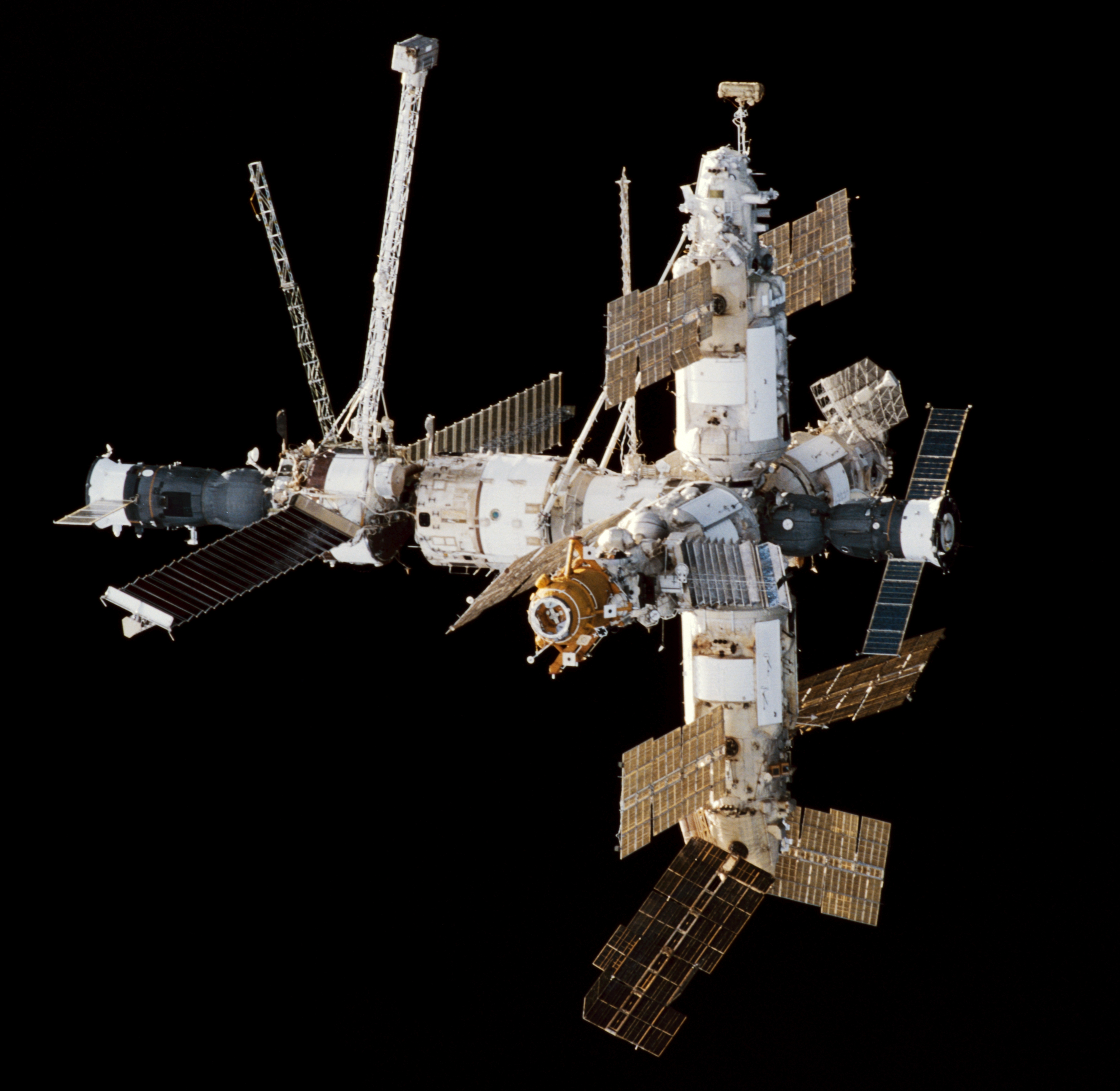
- Mir seen from Space Shuttle Endeavour during STS-89 (28 January 1998)

- Mir insignia

Station statistics
- COSPAR ID: 1986-017A
- SATCAT no.: 16609
- Call sign: Mir
- Crew: 3
- Launch: 20 February 1986 – 23 April 1996
- Launch pad: Baikonur 200/39; Baikonur 81/23; Kennedy LC-39A
- Reentry: 23 March 2001, 05:59 UTC
- Mass: 129,700 kg (285,940 lb)
- Length: 19 metres (62 feet) (Note: from Core module to Kvant-1)
- Width: 31 metres (102 feet) (Note: from Priroda to Docking module)
- Height: 27.5 metres (90 feet) (Note: from Kvant-2 to Spektr)
- Pressurised volume: 350 m^{3} (12,000 cu ft)
- Atmospheric pressure: c. 101.3 kPa (29.91 inHg, 1 atm)
- Periapsis altitude: 354 km (191 nmi) AMSL $\bar{x} \!\,$
- Apoapsis altitude: 374 km (216 nmi) AMSL $\bar{x} \!\,$
- Orbital inclination: 51.6 degrees
- Orbital speed: 7.7 km/s 28,000 km/h; 17,000 mph
- Orbital period: 91.9 minutes $\bar{x} \!\,$
- Orbits per day: 15.7 $\bar{x} \!\,$
- Days in orbit: 5,511 (15 years and 32 days)
- Days occupied: 4,592
- No. of orbits: 86,331
- Statistics as of 23 March 2001 (unless noted otherwise); References
- Configuration
- Station elements as of May 1996

Mir (Russian: Мир, IPA: [ˈmʲir]; lit. 'peace' or 'world') was a space station operated in low Earth orbit from 1986 to 2001, first by the Soviet Union and later by the Russian Federation. Mir was the first modular space station and was assembled in orbit from 1986 to 1996. At the time it was the largest artificial satellite in orbit, only being succeeded by the International Space Station (ISS) after Mir's deorbiting in 2001. The station served as a microgravity research laboratory in which crews conducted experiments in biology, human biology, physics, astronomy, meteorology, and spacecraft systems with a goal of developing technologies required for permanent occupation of space.

Mir was the first continuously inhabited long-term research station in orbit and previously held the record for the longest continuous human presence in space at 3,644 days, until it was surpassed by the ISS in 2010. It holds the record for the longest single human spaceflight, Valeri Polyakov, who spent 437 days on the station from 1994 until 1995. Mir's typical crew size was 3, though larger short-term crews made an appearance, peaking at ten during STS-71. Occupied for twelve and a half years out of its fifteen-year lifespan, 105 cosmonauts and astronauts from 12 different nations visited the station, and conducted 80 spacewalks.

Mir was the next stage of the Soviet space programme's station development, following the success of six crewed single-module stations under the Salyut programme; its inaugural flight, Soyuz T-15, also conducted the only station-to-station trip, docking with Salyut 7 during its mission. Consisting of seven pressurised modules and several unpressurised components, its initial Core Module was launched in 1986. Proton rockets launched all components, except the Docking Module, which was installed by the Space Shuttle on STS-74. Power was provided by several photovoltaic arrays attached directly to the modules. The station was maintained at an orbit between 296 and 421 km (184 and 262 mi) altitude, completing 15.7 orbits per day at an inclination of 51.6°.

Initially, the station was operated by NPO Energia with subcontracting to KB Salyut. Following the dissolution of the Soviet Union, Mir was operated by the Russian Federal Space Agency (RKA). Most of the station's occupants were Soviet/Russian; through international collaborations such as the Interkosmos, Euromir and Shuttle–Mir programmes, the station was made accessible to space travellers from several Asian, European and North American nations. Mir was deorbited in March 2001 after funding was cut off. The cost of the Mir programme was estimated by former RKA General Director Yuri Koptev in 2001 as $4.2 billion over its lifetime (including development, assembly and orbital operation). As of 2026, five of the ten longest human spaceflights ever were aboard Mir.

== Origins ==
Mir was authorised by a 17 February 1976 decree, to design an improved model of the Salyut space stations. Four Salyut space stations had been launched since 1971; three more were launched during Mir's development. It was planned that the station's core module (DOS-7 and the backup DOS-8) would have a total of four docking ports: one at each end of the station (as in the Salyut stations) and one on each side of a docking sphere at the front of the station to allow more modules to expand the station's capabilities. By August 1978, this had evolved to the final configuration: one aft port and five ports in a spherical compartment at the fore.

It was originally planned that the ports would connect to 7.5-tonne (8.3-short-ton) modules derived from the Soyuz spacecraft. These modules would have used a Soyuz propulsion module, as used in Soyuz and Progress; and the descent and orbital modules would have been replaced with a long laboratory module. Following a February 1979 governmental resolution, the programme was consolidated with Vladimir Chelomei's crewed Almaz military space station programme. The docking ports were reinforced to accommodate 20-tonne (22-short-ton) space-station modules based on the TKS spacecraft. NPO Energia was responsible for the overall space station, with work subcontracted to KB Salyut, due to ongoing work on the Energia rocket, Salyut 7, Soyuz-T, and Progress spacecraft. KB Salyut began work in 1979, and drawings were released in 1982 and 1983. New systems incorporated into the station included gyrodyne flywheels (taken from Almaz), Kurs automatic rendezvous system, Luch satellite communications system, Elektron oxygen generators, and Vozdukh carbon dioxide scrubbers and the Salyut 5B digital flight control computer, although the Salyut 5B computer was not installed until the delivery of the Kvant-2 module.

In early 1984, work on Mir had halted while all resources were being put into the Buran programme to prepare the Buran spacecraft for flight testing. Funding resumed in early 1984 when Valentin Glushko was ordered by the Central Committee's Secretary for Space and Defence to orbit Mir by early 1986, in time for the 27th Communist Party Congress.

It was clear that the planned processing flow could not be followed and still meet the 1986 launch date. It was decided on Cosmonaut's Day (12 April) 1985 to ship the flight model of the base block to the Baikonur Cosmodrome and conduct the systems testing and integration there. The module arrived at the launch site on 6 May, with 1100 of 2500 cables requiring rework based on the results of tests to the ground test model at Khrunichev. In October, the base block was rolled outside its cleanroom to carry out communications tests. The first launch attempt on 16 February 1986 was scrubbed when the spacecraft communications failed, but the second launch attempt, on 19 February 1986 at 21:28:23 UTC, was successful, meeting the political deadline.

== Station structure ==
=== Assembly ===
An animation showing the assembly of the Mir station.

The assembly of Mir began on 20 February 1986 with the launch of the Mir core module. Four out of the six modules which were later added (Kvant-2 in 1989, Kristall in 1990, Spektr in 1995 and Priroda in 1996) followed the same sequence to be added to the Mir station:

The module would launch independently on a Proton-K rocket, and rendezvous with the station automatically. It would then dock with the forward (-X) docking node on the core module, and then use its Lyappa arm to attach itself to a fixture on the core module, then lift the module away and rotate the arm to another port, before mating and docking with the new docking port. The node was equipped with only two Konus drogues, which were required for dockings. This meant that, prior to the arrival of each new module, the node would have to be depressurised to allow spacewalking cosmonauts to manually relocate the drogue to the next port to be occupied.

The other two modules, Kvant-1 and the docking module did not follow this procedure.

Kvant-1 was originally designed to be installed on the Salyut 7 station, and did not feature a propulsion system of its own. Instead, Kvant-1 would be assisted by a space tug based on the TKS spacecraft, which delivered the module to the aft docking node of the core module instead of the forward docking node. Kvant-1 successfully docked on 11 April 1987, and the tug disposed of itself the next day.

The docking module was launched on STS-74 by Space Shuttle Atlantis on 12 November 1995, and was mated to the orbiter's docking system via the Canadarm. Atlantis then docked, via the module, to Kristall, then left the module behind when it undocked later in the mission. Various other external components, including two Strela cranes, three truss structures and several experiments and other unpressurised elements were also mounted to the exterior of the station over the course of the station's history.

The station's assembly marked the beginning of the third generation of space station design, being the first to consist of more than one primary spacecraft (thus opening a new era in space architecture). First generation stations such as Salyut 1 and Skylab had monolithic designs, consisting of one module with no resupply capability; the second generation stations Salyut 6 and Salyut 7 comprised a monolithic station with two ports to allow consumables to be replenished by cargo spacecraft such as Progress. The capability of Mir to be expanded with add-on modules meant that each could be designed with a specific purpose in mind (for instance, the core module functioned largely as living quarters), thus eliminating the need to install all the station's equipment in one module.

=== Pressurised modules ===
In its completed configuration, the space station consisted of seven different modules, each launched into orbit separately over a period of ten years by either Proton-K rockets or Space Shuttle Atlantis.

Module	Expedition	Launch date	Launch system	Nation	Isolated view	Station view
Mir Core Module (Core Module)	N/A	19 February 1986	Proton-K	Soviet Union		
Mir Core Module (Core Module)	The base block for the entire Mir complex, the core module, or DOS-7, provided the main living quarters for resident crews and contained environmental systems, early attitude control systems and the station's main engines. The module was based on hardware developed as part of the Salyut programme, and consisted of a stepped-cylinder main compartment and a spherical 'node' module, which served as an airlock and provided ports to which four of the station's expansion modules were berthed and to which a Soyuz or Progress spacecraft could dock. The module's aft port served as the berthing location for Kvant-1.					
Kvant-1 (Astrophysics Module)	EO-2	31 March 1987	Proton-K	Soviet Union		
Kvant-1 (Astrophysics Module)	The first expansion module to be launched, Kvant-1 consisted of two pressurised working compartments and one unpressurised experiment compartment. Scientific equipment included an X-ray telescope, an ultraviolet telescope, a wide-angle camera, high-energy X-ray experiments, an X-ray/gamma ray detector, and the Svetlana electrophoresis unit. The module also carried six gyrodynes for attitude control, in addition to life support systems including an Elektron oxygen generator and a Vozdukh carbon dioxide scrubber.					
Kvant-2 (Augmentation Module)	EO-5	26 November 1989	Proton-K	Soviet Union		
Kvant-2 (Augmentation Module)	The first TKS based module, Kvant-2, was divided into three compartments: an EVA airlock, an instrument/cargo compartment (which could function as a backup airlock), and an instrument/experiment compartment. The module also carried a Soviet version of the Manned Maneuvering Unit for the Orlan space suit, referred to as Ikar, a system for regenerating water from urine, a shower, the Rodnik water storage system and six gyrodynes to augment those already located in Kvant-1. Scientific equipment included a high-resolution camera, spectrometers, X-ray sensors, the Volna 2 fluid flow experiment, and the Inkubator-2 unit, which was used for hatching and raising quail.					
Kristall (Technology Module)	EO-6	31 May 1990	Proton-K	Soviet Union		
Kristall (Technology Module)	Kristall, the fourth module, consisted of two main sections. The first was largely used for materials processing (via various processing furnaces), astronomical observations, and a biotechnology experiment using the Aniur electrophoresis unit. The second section was a docking compartment which featured two APAS-89 docking ports initially intended for use with the Buran programme and eventually used during the Shuttle-Mir programme. The docking compartment also contained the Priroda 5 camera used for Earth resources experiments. Kristall also carried six control moment gyroscopes (CMGs, or "gyrodynes") for attitude control to augment those already on the station, and two collapsible solar arrays.					
Spektr (Power Module)	EO-18	20 May 1995	Proton-K	Russia		
Spektr (Power Module)	Spektr was the first of the three modules launched during the Shuttle-Mir programme; it served as the living quarters for American astronauts and housed NASA-sponsored experiments. The module was designed for remote observation of Earth's environment and contained atmospheric and surface research equipment. It featured four solar arrays which generated approximately half of the station's electrical power. The module also had a science airlock to expose experiments to the vacuum of space selectively. Spektr was rendered unusable following the collision with Progress M-34 in 1997 which damaged the module, exposing it to the vacuum of space.					
Docking Module	EO-20	15 November 1995	Space Shuttle Atlantis (STS-74)	US		
Docking Module	The docking module was designed to help simplify Space Shuttle dockings to Mir. Before the first shuttle docking mission (STS-71), the Kristall module had to be tediously moved to ensure sufficient clearance between Atlantis and Mir's solar arrays. With the addition of the docking module, enough clearance was provided without the need to relocate Kristall. It had two identical APAS-89 docking ports, one attached to the distal port of Kristall with the other available for shuttle docking. This mission was the first time the Space Shuttle was used to attach a module to a space station.					
Priroda (Earth Sensing Module)	EO-21	26 April 1996	Proton-K	Russia		
Priroda (Earth Sensing Module)	The seventh and final Mir module, Priroda's primary purpose was to conduct Earth resource experiments through remote sensing and to develop and verify remote sensing methods. The module's experiments were provided by twelve different nations, and covered microwave, visible, near infrared, and infrared spectral regions using both passive and active sounding methods. The module possessed both pressurised and unpressurised segments, and featured a large, externally mounted synthetic aperture radar dish.					

=== Unpressurised elements ===
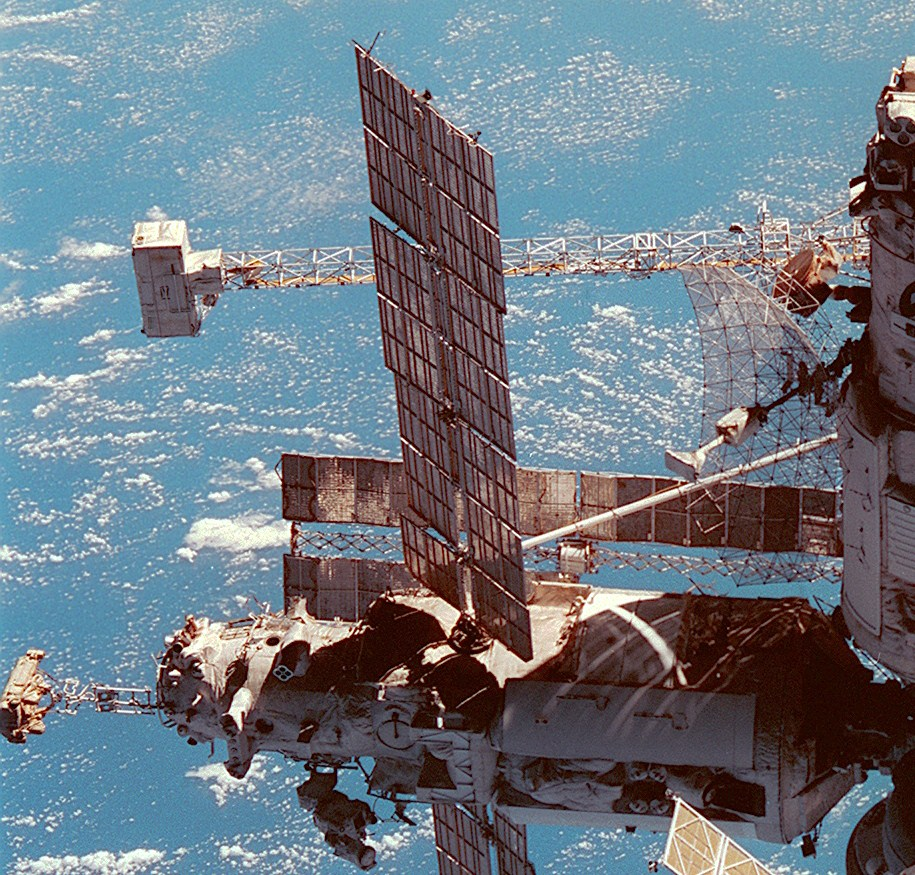
The Travers radar antenna, Sofora girder, VDU thruster block, SPK unit and a Strela crane, alongside Kvant-2 and Priroda

In addition to the pressurised modules, Mir featured several external components. The largest component was the Sofora girder, a large scaffolding-like structure consisting of 20 segments which, when assembled, projected 14 metres from its mount on Kvant-1. A self-contained thruster block, the VDU (Vynosnaya Dvigatyelnaya Ustanovka), was mounted on the end of Sofora and was used to augment the roll-control thrusters on the core module. The VDU's increased distance from Mir's axis allowed an 85% decrease in fuel consumption, reducing the amount of propellant required to orient the station. A second girder, Rapana, was mounted aft of Sofora on Kvant-1. This girder, a small prototype of a structure intended to be used on Mir-2 to hold large parabolic dishes away from the main station structure, was 5 metres long and used as a mounting point for externally mounted exposure experiments.

To assist in moving objects around the exterior of the station during EVAs, Mir featured two Strela cargo cranes mounted to the sides of the core module, used for moving spacewalking cosmonauts and parts. The cranes consisted of telescopic poles assembled in sections which measured around 1.8 metres (6 ft) when collapsed, but when extended using a hand crank were 14 metres (46 ft) long, meaning that all of the station's modules could be accessed during spacewalks.

Each module was fitted with external components specific to the experiments that were carried out within that module, the most obvious being the Travers antenna mounted to Priroda. This synthetic aperture radar consisted of a large dish-like framework mounted outside the module, with associated equipment within, used for Earth observations experiments, as was most of the other equipment on Priroda, including various radiometers and scan platforms. Kvant-2 also featured several scan platforms and was fitted with a mounting bracket to which the cosmonaut manoeuvring unit, or Ikar, was mated. This backpack was designed to assist cosmonauts in moving around the station and the planned Buran in a manner similar to the US Manned Maneuvering Unit, but it was only used once, during EO-5.

In addition to module-specific equipment, Kvant-2, Kristall, Spektr and Priroda were each equipped with one Lyappa arm, a robotic arm which, after the module had docked to the core module's forward port, grappled one of two fixtures positioned on the core module's docking node. The arriving module's docking probe was then retracted, and the arm raised the module so that it could be pivoted 90° for docking to one of the four radial docking ports.

=== Power supply ===
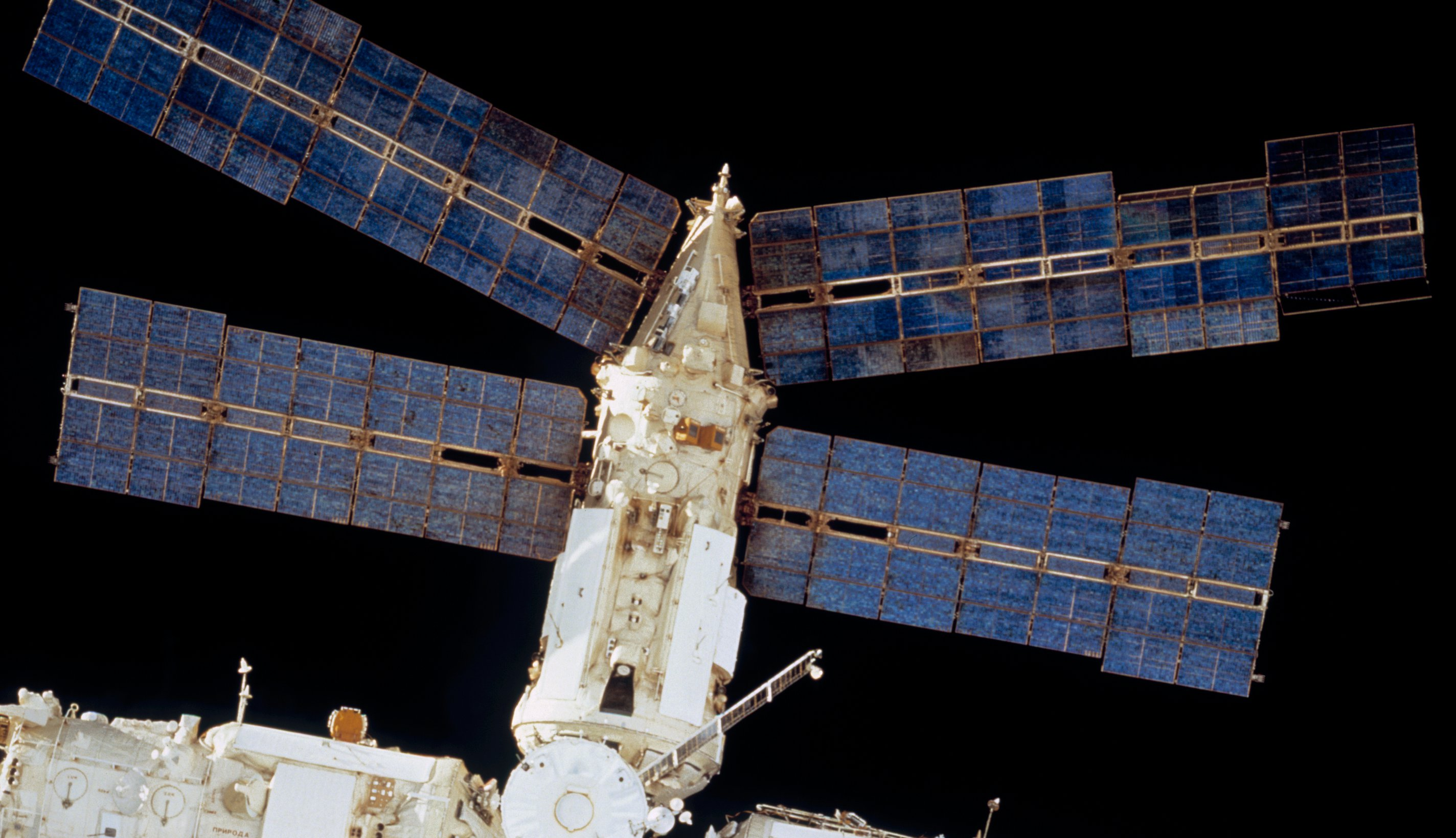
The four solar arrays on Spektr

Photovoltaic arrays powered Mir. The station used a 28 volt DC supply which provided 5-, 10-, 20- and 50-amp taps. When the station was illuminated by sunlight, several solar arrays mounted on the pressurised modules provided power to Mir's systems and charged the nickel-cadmium storage batteries installed throughout the station. The arrays rotated in only one degree of freedom over a 180° arc, and tracked the Sun using Sun sensors and motors installed in the array mounts. The station itself also had to be oriented to ensure optimum illumination of the arrays. When the station's all-sky sensor detected that Mir had entered Earth's shadow, the arrays were rotated to the optimum angle predicted for reacquiring the Sun once the station passed out of the shadow. The batteries, each of 60 Ah capacity, were then used to power the station until the arrays recovered their maximum output on the day side of Earth.

The solar arrays themselves were launched and installed over a period of eleven years, more slowly than originally planned, with the station continually suffering from a shortage of power as a result. The first two arrays, each 38 m^{2} (410 ft^{2}) in area, were launched on the core module, and together provided a total of 9 kW of power. A third, dorsal panel was launched on Kvant-1 and mounted on the core module in 1987, providing a further 2.5 kW from a 22 m^{2} (240 ft^{2}) area. Kvant-2, launched in 1989, provided two 10 metres (33 feet) long panels which supplied 3.5 kW each, whilst Kristall was launched with two collapsible, 15 metres (49 feet) long arrays (providing 4 kW each) which were intended to be moved to Kvant-1 and installed on mounts which were attached during a spacewalk by the EO-8 crew in 1991.

This relocation was begun in 1995, when the panels were retracted and the left panel installed on Kvant-1. By this time all the arrays had degraded and were supplying much less power. To rectify this, Spektr (launched in 1995), which had initially been designed to carry two arrays, was modified to hold four, providing a total of 126 m^{2} (1,360 ft^{2}) of array with a 16 kW supply. Two further arrays were flown to the station on board the Space Shuttle Atlantis during STS-74, carried on the docking module. The first of these, the Mir cooperative solar array, consisted of American photovoltaic cells mounted on a Russian frame. It was installed on the unoccupied mount on Kvant-1 in May 1996 and was connected to the socket that had previously been occupied by the core module's dorsal panel, which was by this point barely supplying 1 kW. The other panel, originally intended to be launched on Priroda, replaced the Kristall panel on Kvant-1 in November 1997, completing the station's electrical system.

=== Orbit control ===
Graph showing the changing altitude of Mir from 19 February 1986 until 21 March 2001

Mir was maintained in a near circular orbit with an average perigee of 354 km (220 mi) and an average apogee of 374 km (232 mi), travelling at an average speed of 27,700 km/h (17,200 mph) and completing 15.7 orbits per day. As the station constantly lost altitude because of slight atmospheric drag, it needed to be boosted to a higher altitude several times each year. This boost was generally performed by Progress resupply vessels, although during the Shuttle-Mir programme the task was performed by US Space Shuttles, and, prior to the arrival of Kvant-1, the engines on the core module could also accomplish the task.

Attitude control was maintained by a combination of two mechanisms; to hold a set attitude, a system of twelve control moment gyroscopes (CMGs, or "gyrodynes") rotating at 10,000 rpm kept the station oriented, six CMGs being located in each of the Kvant-1 and Kvant-2 modules. When the attitude of the station needed to be changed, the gyrodynes were disengaged, thrusters (including those mounted directly to the modules, and the VDU thruster used for roll control mounted to the Sofora girder) were used to attain the new attitude and the CMGs were reengaged. This was done fairly regularly depending on experimental needs; for instance, Earth or astronomical observations required that the instrument recording images be continuously aimed at the target, and so the station was oriented to make this possible. Conversely, materials processing experiments required the minimisation of movement on board the station, and so Mir would be oriented in a gravity gradient attitude for stability. Prior to the arrival of the modules containing these gyrodynes, the station's attitude was controlled using thrusters located on the core module alone, and, in an emergency, the thrusters on docked Soyuz spacecraft could be used to maintain the station's orientation.

=== Communications ===
Radio communications provided telemetry and scientific data links between Mir and the RKA Mission Control Centre (TsUP). Radio links were also used during rendezvous and docking procedures and for audio and video communication between crew members, flight controllers and family members. As a result, Mir was equipped with several communication systems used for different purposes. The station communicated directly with the ground via the Lira antenna mounted to the core module. The Lira antenna also had the capability to use the Luch data relay satellite system (which fell into disrepair in the 1990s) and the network of Soviet tracking ships deployed in various locations around the world (which also became unavailable in the 1990s). UHF radio was used by cosmonauts conducting EVAs. UHF was also employed by other spacecraft that docked to or undocked from the station, such as Soyuz, Progress, and the Space Shuttle, to receive commands from the TsUP and Mir crew members via the TORU system.

=== Microgravity ===
At Mir's orbital altitude, the force of Earth's gravity was 88% of sea level gravity. While the constant free fall of the station offered a perceived sensation of weightlessness, the onboard environment was not one of weightlessness or zero gravity. The environment was often described as microgravity. This state of perceived weightlessness was not perfect, being disturbed by five separate effects:

- The drag resulting from the residual atmosphere;
- Vibratory acceleration caused by mechanical systems and the crew on the station;
- Orbital corrections by the on-board gyroscopes (which spun at 10,000 rpm, producing vibrations of 166.67 Hz) or thrusters;
- Tidal forces. Parts of Mir that weren't at the exact the same distance from Earth as other parts tended to follow separate orbits. As each point was physically part of the station, remedying this was impossible, and so each component was subject to small accelerations from tidal forces;
- The differences in orbital plane between different locations on the station.

=== Life support ===
Mir's environmental control and life support system (ECLSS) provided or controlled atmospheric pressure, fire detection, oxygen levels, waste management and water supply. The highest priority for the ECLSS was the station's atmosphere, but the system also collected, processed, and stored waste and water produced and used by the crew—a process that recycles fluid from the sink, toilet, and condensation from the air. The Elektron system generated oxygen electrolytically, venting hydrogen to space. Bottled oxygen and solid fuel oxygen generation (SFOG) canisters, a system known as Vika, provided backup. Carbon dioxide was removed from the air by the Vozdukh system. Other byproducts of human metabolism, such as methane from the intestines and ammonia from sweat, were removed by activated charcoal filters. Similar systems are presently used on the ISS.

The atmosphere on Mir was similar to Earth's. Normal air pressure on the station was 101.3 kPa (14.7 psi); the same as at sea level on Earth. An Earth-like atmosphere offers benefits for crew comfort.

== International cooperation ==
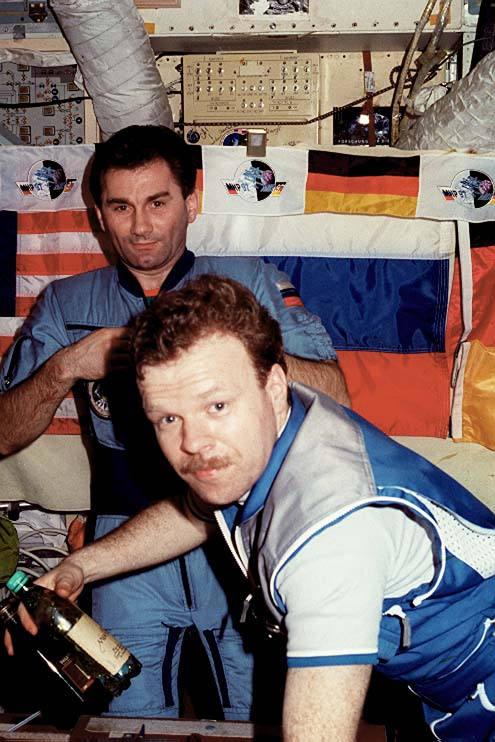
Reinhold Ewald (right) and Vasily Tsibliyev in the core module during Ewald's visit to Mir

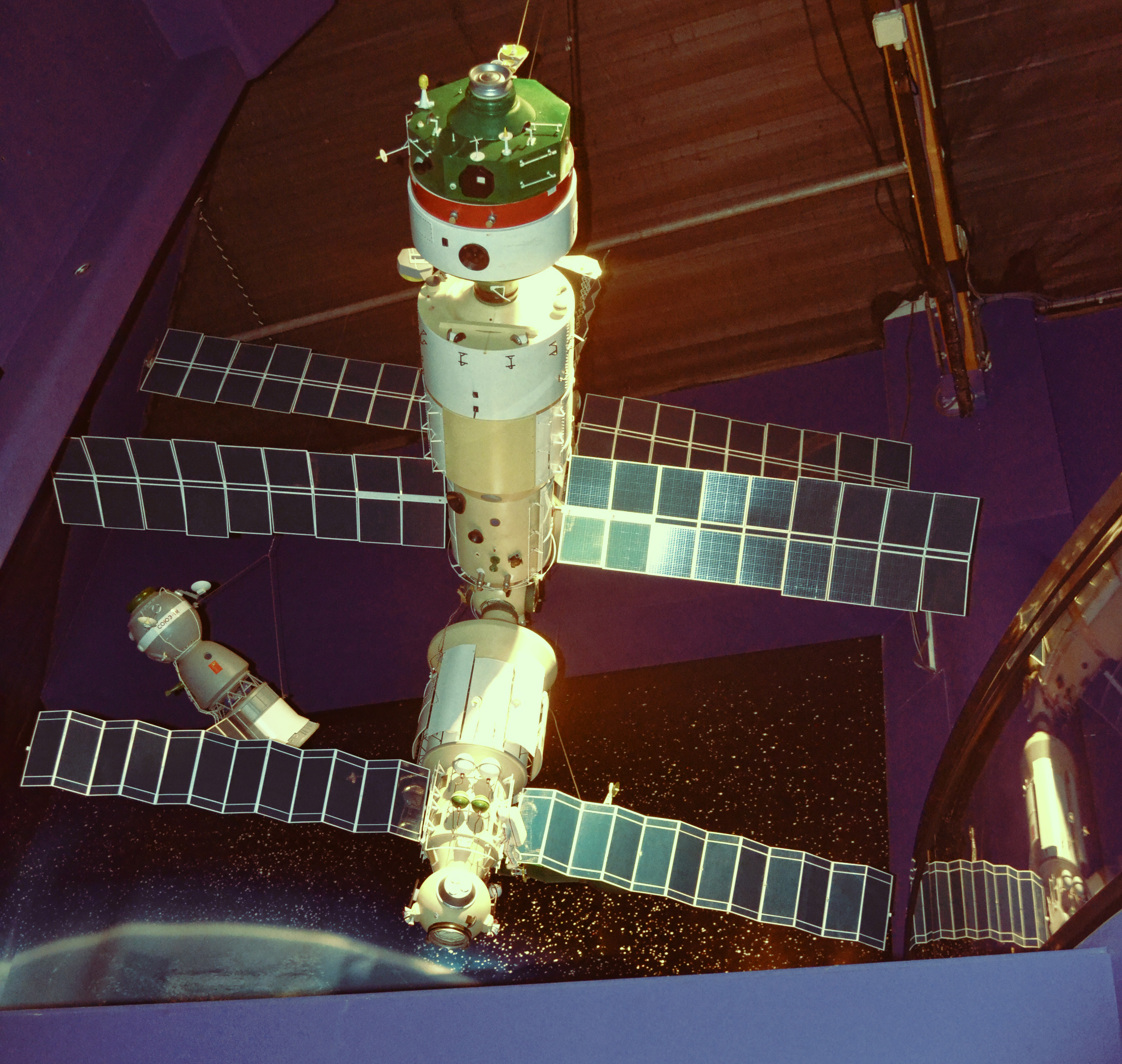
Scale model replica of the MIR Space Station at the Euro Space Center Belgium

=== Interkosmos ===
Interkosmos (Russian: Интеркосмос) was a Soviet space exploration programme which allowed members from foreign countries allied with the Soviet Union to participate in crewed and uncrewed space exploration missions. Participation was also made available to governments of countries such as France and India.

Only the last three of the programme's 14 missions consisted of an expedition to Mir but none resulted in an extended stay in the station:

- Muhammed Faris – EP-1 (1987) Syria Turkey
- Aleksandr Panayatov Aleksandrov – EP-2 (1988) Bulgaria
- Abdul Ahad Mohmand – EP-3 (1988) Afghanistan

=== European involvement ===
Various European astronauts visited Mir as part of several cooperative programmes, on both the Soyuz and the Space Shuttle:

- Jean-Loup Chrétien – Aragatz (1988) France
- Helen Sharman – Project Juno (1991) UK
- Franz Viehböck – Austromir '91 (1991) Austria
- Klaus-Dietrich Flade – Mir '92 (1992) Germany
- Michel Tognini – Antarès (1992) France
- Jean-Pierre Haigneré – Altair (1993) France
- Ulf Merbold – Euromir '94 (1994) Germany
- Thomas Reiter – Euromir '95 (1995) Germany
- Claudie Haigneré – Cassiopée (1996) France
- Reinhold Ewald – Mir '97 (1997) Germany
- Jean-François Clervoy – STS-84 (1997) France
- Jean-Loup Chrétien – STS-86 (1997) France
- Léopold Eyharts – Pégase (1998) France
- Jean-Pierre Haigneré – Perseus (1999) France
- Ivan Bella – Stefanik (1999) Slovakia

=== Shuttle–Mir program ===
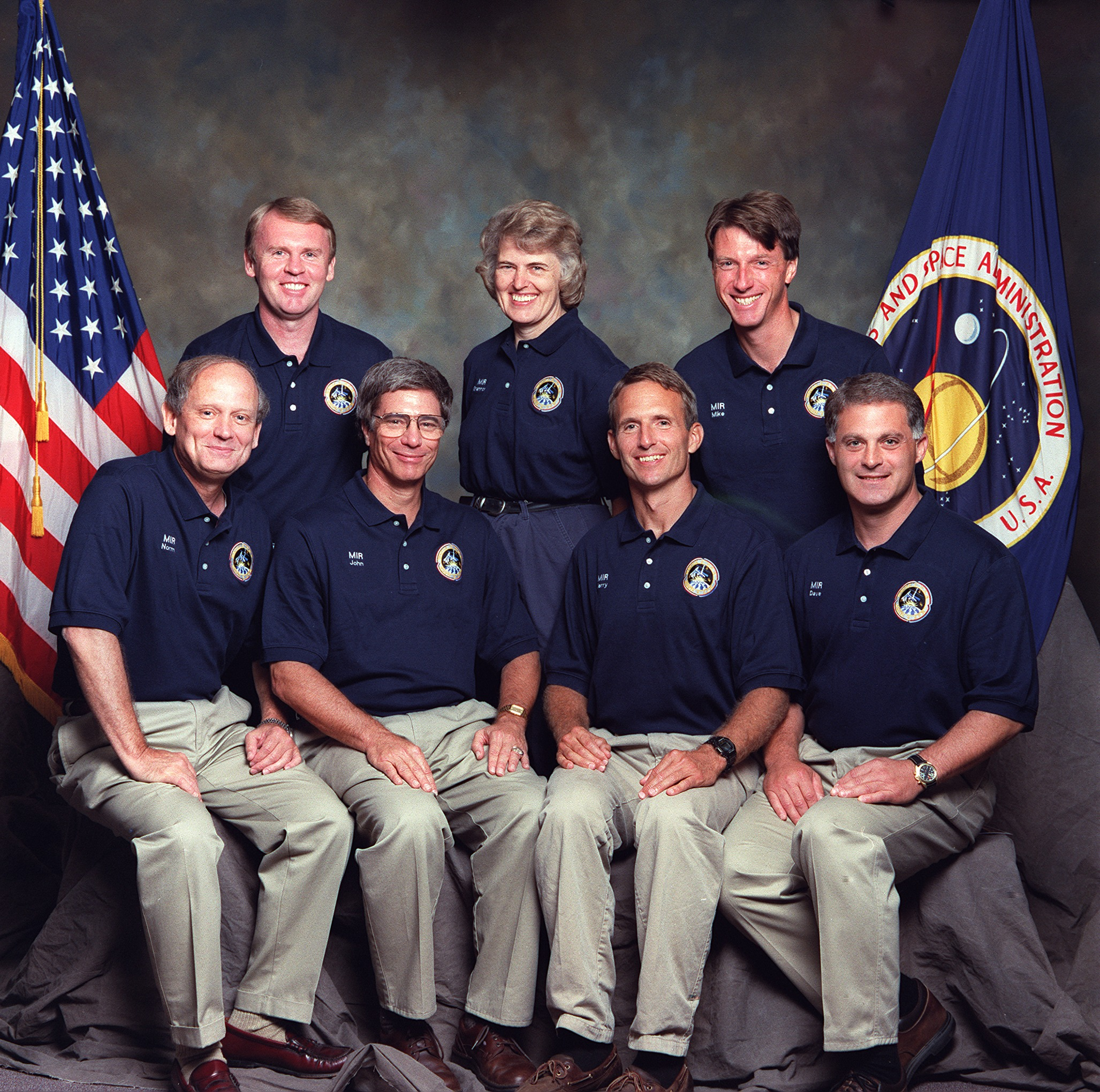
The seven NASA astronauts who carried out long-duration missions on Mir

In the early 1980s, NASA planned to launch a modular space station called Freedom as a counterpart to Mir, while the Soviets were planning to construct Mir-2 in the 1990s as a replacement for the station. Because of budget and design constraints, Freedom never progressed past mock-ups and minor component tests and, with the fall of the Soviet Union and the end of the Space Race, the project was nearly cancelled entirely by the United States House of Representatives. The post-Soviet economic chaos in Russia also led to the cancellation of Mir-2, though only after its base block, DOS-8, had been constructed. Similar budgetary difficulties were faced by other nations with space station projects, which prompted the US government to negotiate with European states, Russia, Japan, and Canada in the early 1990s to begin a collaborative project. In June 1992, American president George H. W. Bush and Russian president Boris Yeltsin agreed to cooperate on space exploration. The resulting Agreement between the United States of America and the Russian Federation Concerning Cooperation in the Exploration and Use of Outer Space for Peaceful Purposes called for a short joint space programme with one American astronaut deployed to the Russian space station Mir and two Russian cosmonauts deployed to a Space Shuttle.

In September 1993, US vice president Al Gore Jr., and Russian prime minister Viktor Chernomyrdin announced plans for a new space station, which eventually became the ISS. They also agreed, in preparation for this new project, that the United States would be heavily involved in the Mir programme as part of an international project known as the Shuttle–Mir Programme. The project, sometimes called "Phase One", was intended to allow the United States to learn from Russian experience in long-duration spaceflight and to foster a spirit of cooperation between the two nations and their space agencies, the US National Aeronautics and Space Administration (NASA) and the Russian Federal Space Agency (Roskosmos). The project prepared the way for further cooperative space ventures, specifically, "Phase Two" of the joint project, the construction of the ISS. The programme was announced in 1993; the first mission started in 1994, and the project continued until its scheduled completion in 1998. Eleven Space Shuttle missions, a joint Soyuz flight, and almost 1000 cumulative days in space for US astronauts occurred over the course of seven long-duration expeditions.

=== Other visitors ===
- Toyohiro Akiyama – Kosmoreporter (1990) Japan
- Chris Hadfield – STS-74 (1995) Canada
- A British con artist, Peter Rodney Llewellyn, almost visited Mir in 1999 on a private contract after promising US$100 million for the privilege.

== Life on board ==
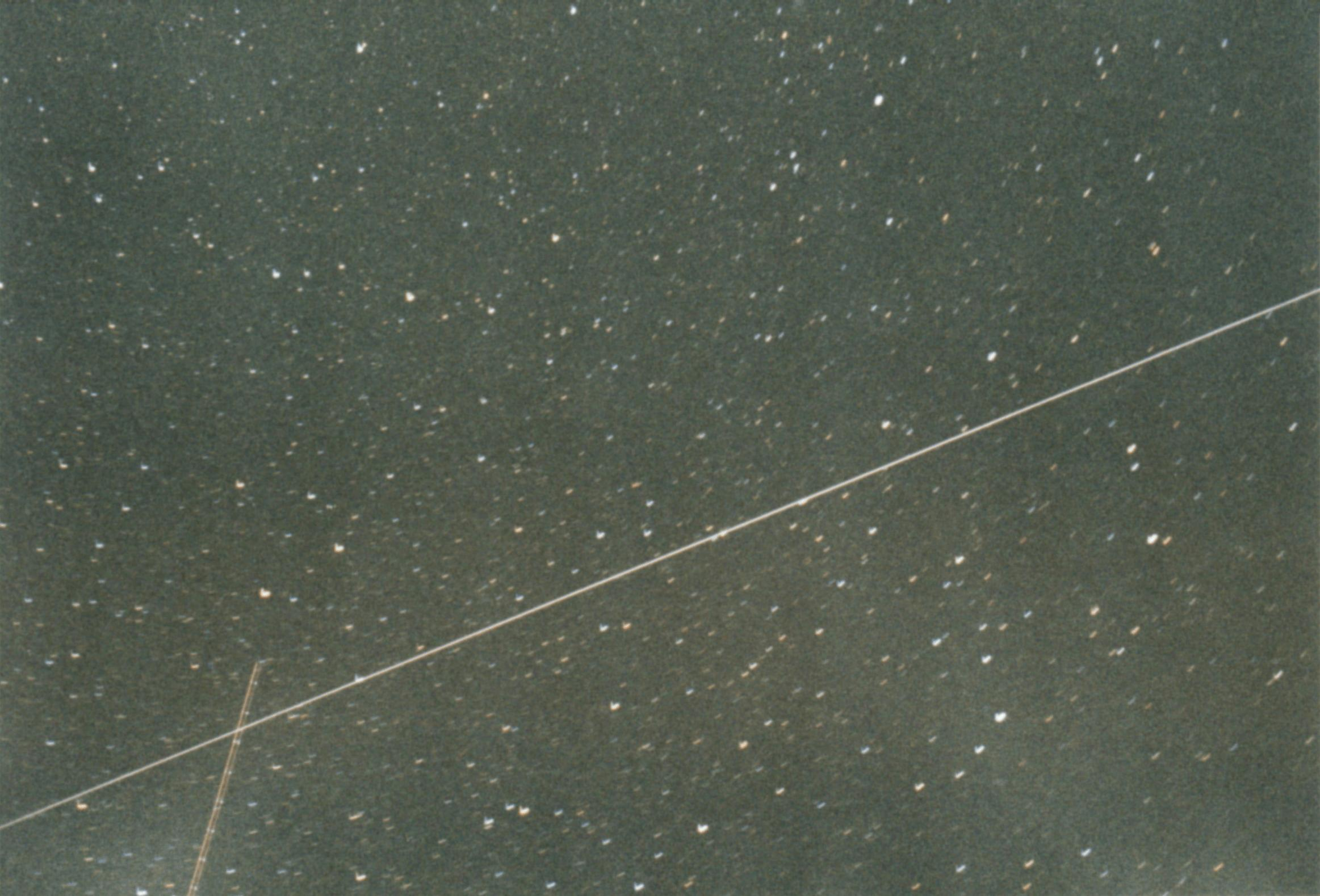
Time exposure of Mir passing over Earth's surface, May 1997.

A video tour of Mir from September 1996, during STS-79

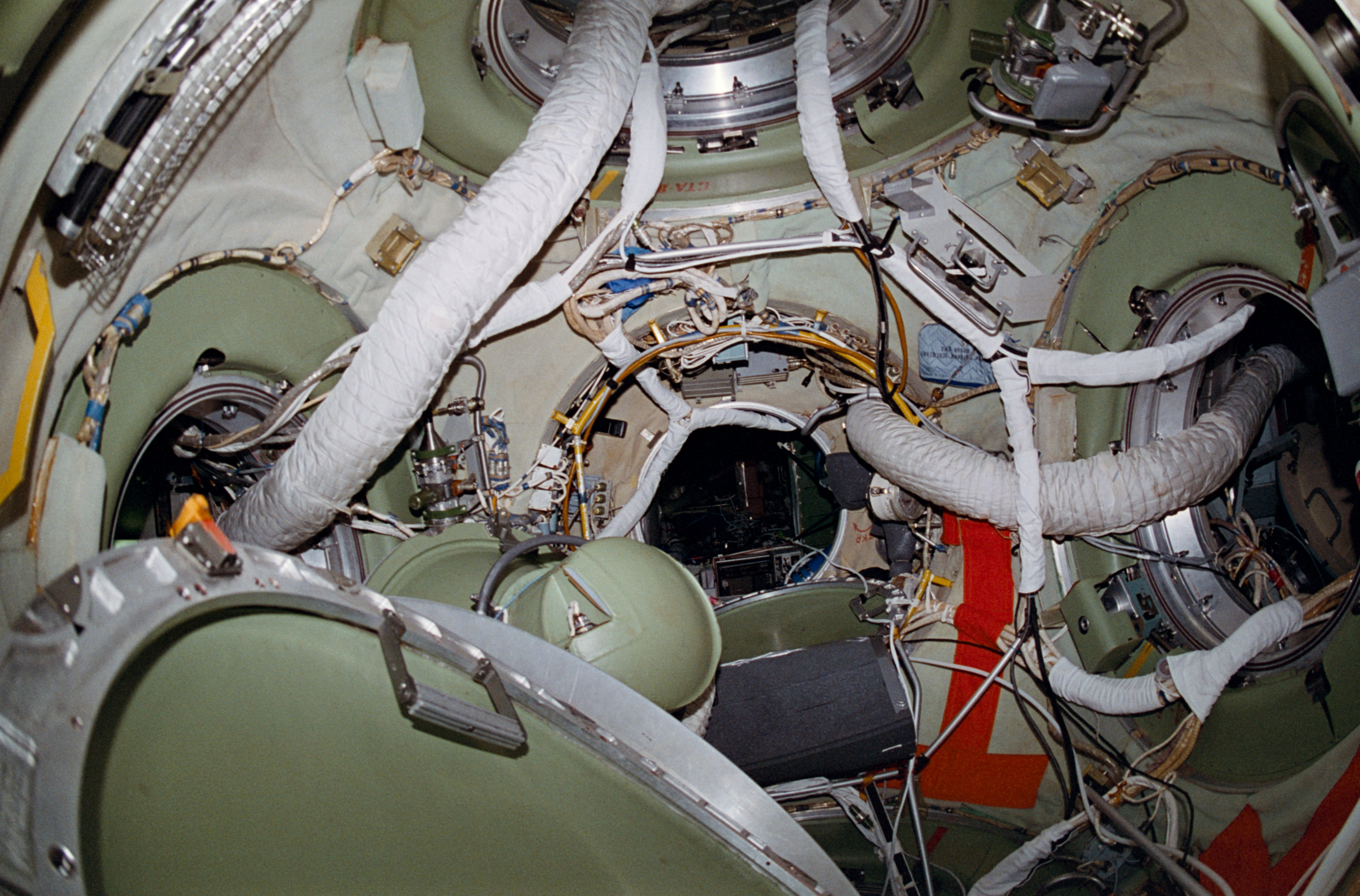
A view of the interior of the core module's docking node, showing the crowded nature of the station.

Inside, the 130-tonne (140-short-ton) Mir was crowded with hoses, cables and scientific instruments—as well as articles of everyday life, such as photos, children's drawings, books and a guitar. It commonly housed three crew members, but was capable of supporting as many as six for short stays. The station was designed to remain in orbit for around five years; it remained in orbit for fifteen. As a result, NASA astronaut John Blaha reported that, with the exception of Priroda and Spektr, which were added late in the station's life, Mir did look used; which is a result of its aged condition.

=== Crew schedule ===
The time zone used on board Mir was Moscow Time (MSK; UTC+03). The windows were covered during night hours to give the impression of darkness because the station experienced 16 sunrises and sunsets a day. A typical day for the crew began with a wake-up at 08:00 MSK, followed by two hours of personal hygiene and breakfast. Work was conducted from 10:00 until 13:00, followed by an hour of exercise and an hour's lunch break. Three more hours of work and another hour of exercise followed lunch, and the crews began preparing for their evening meal at about 19:00. The cosmonauts were free to do as they wished in the evening, and largely worked to their own pace during the day.

In their spare time, crews were able to catch up with work, observe the Earth below, respond to letters, drawings, and other items brought from Earth (and give them an official stamp to show they had been aboard Mir), or make use of the station's ham radio. Two amateur radio call signs, U1MIR and U2MIR, were assigned to Mir in the late 1980s, allowing amateur radio operators on Earth to communicate with the cosmonauts. The station was also equipped with a supply of books and films for the crew to read and watch.

NASA astronaut Jerry Linenger related how life on board Mir was structured and lived according to the detailed itineraries provided by ground control. Every second on board was accounted for and all activities were timetabled. After working some time on Mir, Linenger came to feel that the order in which his activities were allocated did not represent the most logical or efficient order possible for these activities. He decided to perform his tasks in an order that he felt enabled him to work more efficiently, be less fatigued, and suffer less from stress. Linenger noted that his fellow astronauts on Mir did not "improvise" in this way, and as a medical doctor he observed the effects of stress on his companions that he believed was the outcome of following an itinerary without making modifications to it. Despite this, he commented that his fellow astronauts performed all their tasks in a supremely professional manner.

Astronaut Shannon Lucid, who set the record for longest stay in space by a woman while aboard Mir (surpassed by Sunita Williams 11 years later on the ISS), also commented about working aboard Mir: "I think going to work on a daily basis on Mir is very similar to going to work on a daily basis on an outstation in Antarctica. The big difference with going to work here is the isolation, because you really are isolated. You don't have a lot of support from the ground. You really are on your own."

=== Exercise ===
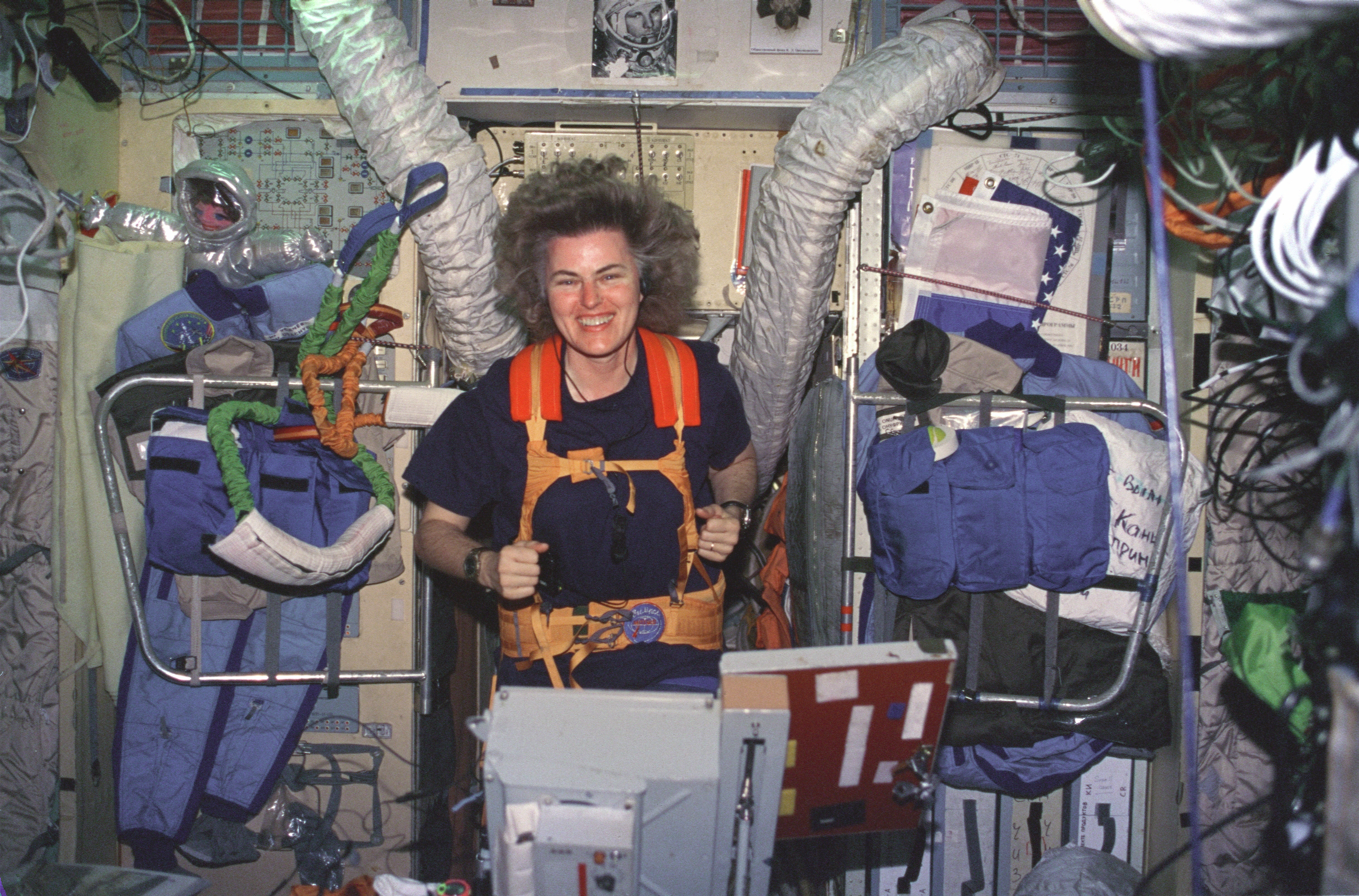
Shannon Lucid exercises on a treadmill during her stay aboard Mir.

The most significant adverse effects of long-term weightlessness are muscle atrophy and deterioration of the skeleton, or spaceflight osteopenia. Other significant effects include fluid redistribution, a slowing of the cardiovascular system, decreased production of red blood cells, balance disorders, and a weakening of the immune system. Lesser symptoms include loss of body mass, nasal congestion, sleep disturbance, excess flatulence, and puffiness of the face. These effects begin to reverse quickly upon return to the Earth.

To prevent some of these effects, the station was equipped with two treadmills (in the core module and Kvant-2) and a stationary bicycle (in the core module); each cosmonaut was to cycle the equivalent of 10 kilometres (6.2 mi) and run the equivalent of 5 kilometres (3.1 mi) per day. Cosmonauts used bungee cords to strap themselves to the treadmill. Researchers believe that exercise is a good countermeasure for the bone and muscle density loss that occurs in low-gravity situations.

=== Hygiene ===
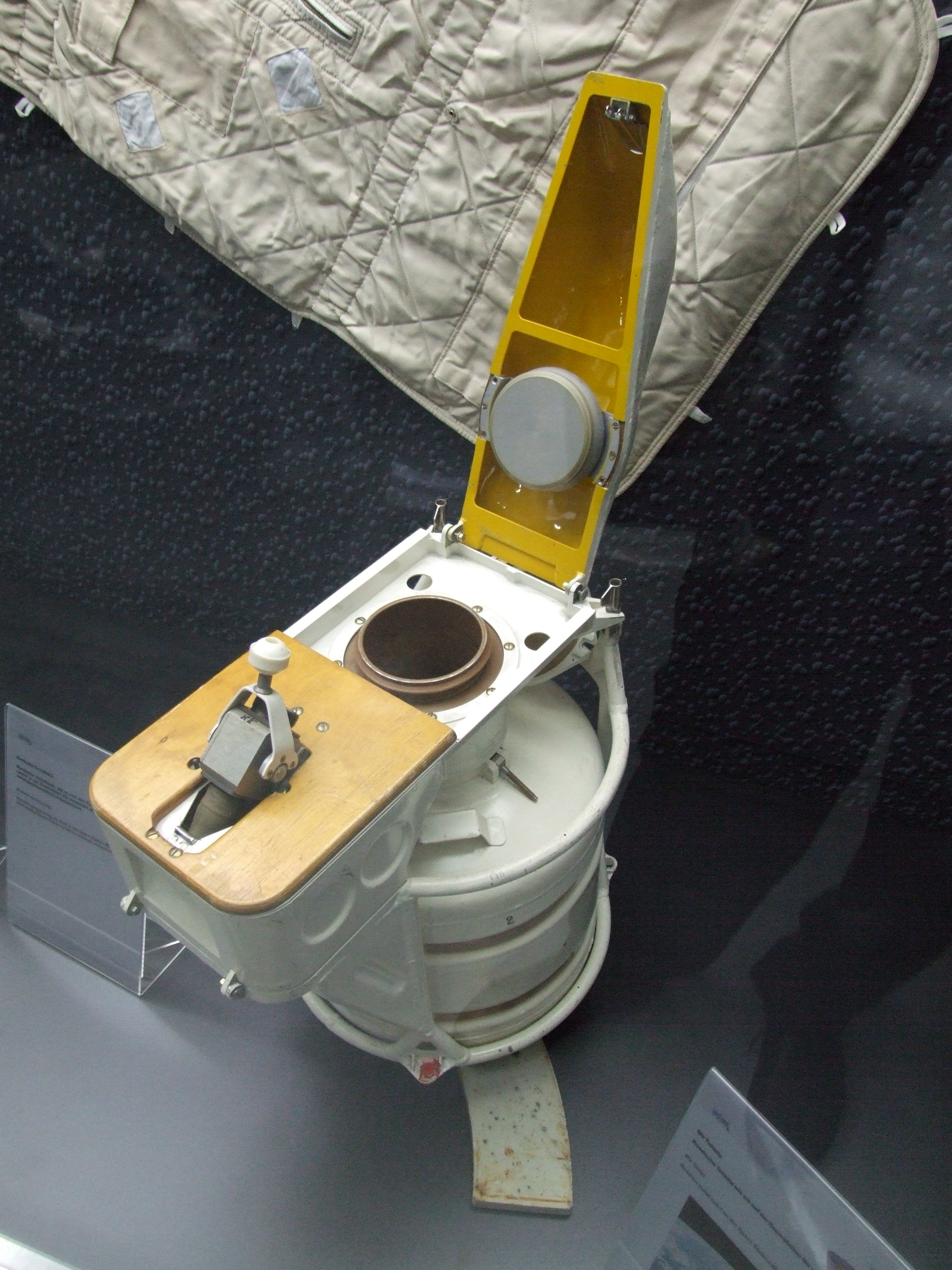
One of the space toilets used aboard Mir

There were two space toilets (ASUs) on Mir, located in the core module and Kvant-2. They used a fan-driven suction system similar to the Space Shuttle Waste Collection System. The user is first fastened to the toilet seat, which was equipped with spring-loaded restraining bars to ensure a good seal. A lever operated a powerful fan and a suction hole slid open: the air stream carried the waste away. Solid waste was collected in individual bags which were stored in an aluminium container. Full containers were transferred to Progress spacecraft for disposal. Liquid waste was evacuated by a hose connected to the front of the toilet, with anatomically appropriate "urine funnel adapters" attached to the tube so both men and women could use the same toilet. Waste was collected and transferred to the Water Recovery System, where it could be recycled back into drinking water, but was usually used to produce oxygen via the Elektron system.

Mir featured a shower, the Bania, located in Kvant-2. It was an improvement on the units installed in previous Salyut stations, but proved difficult to use due to the time required to set up, use, and stow. The shower, which featured a plastic curtain and fan to collect water via an airflow, was later converted into a steam room; it eventually had its plumbing removed and the space was reused. When the shower was unavailable, crew members washed using wet wipes, with soap dispensed from a toothpaste tube-like container, or using a washbasin equipped with a plastic hood, located in the core module. Crews were also provided with rinse-less shampoo and edible toothpaste to save water.

On a 1998 visit to Mir, bacteria and larger organisms were found to have proliferated in water globules formed from moisture that had condensed behind service panels.

=== Sleeping in space ===
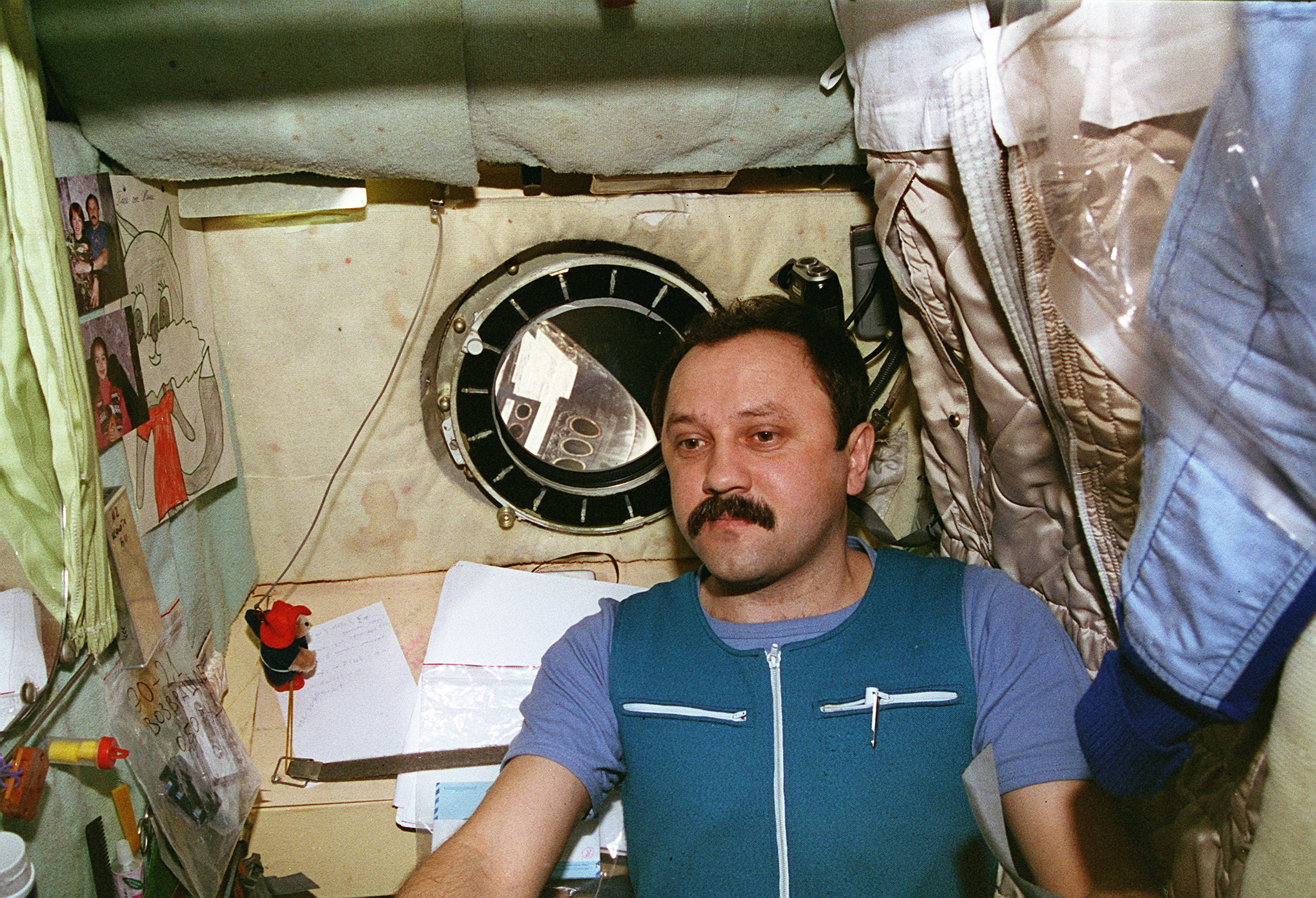
Cosmonaut Yury Usachov in his Kayutka

The station provided two permanent crew quarters, the Kayutkas, phonebooth sized boxes set towards the rear of the core module, each featuring a tethered sleeping bag, a fold-out desk, a porthole, and storage for personal effects. Visiting crews had no allocated sleep module, instead attaching a sleeping bag to an available space on a wall; US astronauts installed themselves within Spektr until a collision with a Progress spacecraft caused the depressurisation of that module. It was important that crew accommodations be well ventilated; otherwise, astronauts could wake up oxygen-deprived and gasping for air, because a bubble of their own exhaled carbon dioxide had formed around their heads.

=== Food and drink ===
Most of the food eaten by station crews was frozen, refrigerated or canned. Meals were prepared by the cosmonauts, with the help of a dietitian, before their flight to the station. The diet was designed to provide around 300 grams (11 oz) of protein, 130 grams (4.6 oz) of fat and 330 grams (12 oz) of carbohydrates per day, in addition to appropriate mineral and vitamin supplements. Meals were spaced out through the day to aid assimilation. Canned food such as jellied beef tongue was placed into a niche in the core module's table, where it could be warmed in 5–10 minutes. Usually, crews drank tea, coffee and fruit juices, but, unlike the ISS, the station also had a supply of cognac and vodka for special occasions.

=== Microbiological environmental hazards ===
In the 1990s, 90 species of micro-organisms were found inside Mir, four years after the station's launch. By the time of its decommissioning in 2001, the number of known different microorganisms had grown to 140. As space stations get older, the problems with contamination get worse. Moulds that develop aboard space stations can produce acids that degrade metal, glass and rubber. The moulds in Mir were found growing behind panels and inside air-conditioning equipment. The moulds also caused a foul smell, which was often cited as visitors' strongest impression. Researchers in 2018 reported, after detecting the presence on the International Space Station (ISS) of five Enterobacter bugandensis bacterial strains, none pathogenic to humans, that microorganisms on ISS should be carefully monitored to continue ensuring a medically healthy environment for the astronauts.

Some biologists were concerned about the mutant fungi being a major microbiological hazard for humans, and reaching Earth in the splashdown, after having been in an isolated environment for 15 years. On the other hand, some scientists are conducting research on whether this situation can be used for life in space. Scientists have discovered that fungi could actually assist space travel and detect liveable environments for humankind in space. In fact, these resilient and frequently underestimated organisms might hold the key to our future on other planets. Fungi play a dramatic role in creating innovative and sustainable building materials. Most fungi possess mycelia, hair-like root structures that grow and spread across surfaces. As mycelia expand, they bind surrounding materials, as wood chips, sawdust, or regolith (the loose material covering solid rock on planetary bodies like the Moon or Mars). This growth process results in a dense, interconnected network that creates a remarkably strong and durable substance. The resulting mycelium-based material offers notable thermal insulation and radiation protection, making it an ideal candidate for construction, particularly in severe environments like outer space or other interplanetary habitats.

== Station operations ==
=== Expeditions ===
Mir was visited by a total of 28 long-duration or "principal" crews, each of which was given a sequential expedition number formatted as EO-X. Expeditions varied in length (from the 72-day flight of the crew of EO-28 to the 437-day flight of Valeri Polyakov), but generally lasted around six months. Principal expedition crews consisted of two or three crew members, who often launched as part of one expedition but returned with another (Polyakov launched with EO-14 and landed with EO-17). The principal expeditions were often supplemented with visiting crews who remained on the station during the week-long handover period between one crew and the next before returning with the departing crew, the station's life support system being able to support a crew of up to six for short periods. The station was occupied for a total of four distinct periods; 12 March–16 July 1986 (EO-1), 5 February 1987 – 27 April 1989 (EO-2–EO-4), the record-breaking run from 5 September 1989 – 28 August 1999 (EO-5–EO-27), and 4 April–16 June 2000 (EO-28). By the end, it had been visited by 104 different people from 12 different nations, making it the most visited spacecraft in history (a record later surpassed by the ISS).

==== Early existence ====
The core module with Kvant-1 and Soyuz TM-3

Due to pressure to launch the station on schedule, mission planners were left without Soyuz spacecraft or modules to launch to the station at first. It was decided to launch Soyuz T-15 on a dual mission to both Mir and Salyut 7.

Leonid Kizim and Vladimir Solovyov first docked with Mir on 15 March 1986. During their nearly 51-day stay on Mir, they brought the station online and checked its systems. They unloaded two Progress spacecraft launched after their arrival, Progress 25 and Progress 26.

On 5 May 1986, they undocked from Mir for a day-long journey to Salyut 7. They spent 51 days there and gathered 400 kg of scientific material from Salyut 7 for return to Mir. While Soyuz T-15 was at Salyut 7, the uncrewed Soyuz TM-1 arrived at the unoccupied Mir and remained for 9 days, testing the new Soyuz TM model. Soyuz T-15 redocked with Mir on 26 June and delivered the experiments and 20 instruments, including a multichannel spectrometer. The EO-1 crew spent their last 20 days on Mir conducting Earth observations before returning to Earth on 16 July 1986, leaving the new station unoccupied.

The second expedition to Mir, EO-2, launched on Soyuz TM-2 on 5 February 1987. During their stay, the Kvant-1 module, launched on 30 March 1987, arrived. It was the first experimental version of a planned series of '37K' modules scheduled to be launched to Mir on Buran. Kvant-1 was originally planned to dock with Salyut 7; due to technical problems during its development, it was reassigned to Mir. The module carried the first set of six gyroscopes for attitude control. The module also carried instruments for X-ray and ultraviolet astrophysical observations.

The initial rendezvous of the Kvant-1 module with Mir on 5 April 1987 was troubled by the failure of the onboard control system. After the failure of the second attempt to dock, the resident cosmonauts, Yuri Romanenko and Aleksandr Laveykin, conducted an EVA to fix the problem. They found a trash bag which had been left in orbit after the departure of one of the previous cargo ships and was now located between the module and the station, which prevented the docking. After removing the bag, docking was completed on 12 April.

The Soyuz TM-2 launch was the beginning of a string of 6 Soyuz launches and three long-duration crews between 5 February 1987 and 27 April 1989. This period also saw the first international visitors, Muhammed Faris (Syria), Abdul Ahad Mohmand (Afghanistan) and Jean-Loup Chrétien (France). With the departure of EO-4 on Soyuz TM-7 on 27 April 1989 the station was again left unoccupied.

==== Third start ====
The launch of Soyuz TM-8 on 5 September 1989 marked the beginning of the longest human presence in space, until 23 October 2010, when this record was surpassed by the ISS. It also marked the beginning of Mir's second expansion. The Kvant-2 and Kristall modules were now ready for launch. Alexander Viktorenko and Aleksandr Serebrov docked with Mir and brought the station out of its five-month hibernation. On 29 September the cosmonauts installed equipment in the docking system in preparation for the arrival of Kvant-2, the first of the 20 tonne add-on modules based on the TKS spacecraft from the Almaz programme.

Mir following the arrival of Kvant-2 in 1989

After a 40-day delay caused by faulty computer chips, Kvant-2 was launched on 26 November 1989. After problems deploying the craft's solar array and with the automated docking systems on both Kvant-2 and Mir, the new module was docked manually on 6 December. Kvant-2 added a second set of control moment gyroscopes (CMGs, or "gyrodynes") to Mir, and brought the new life support systems for recycling water and generating oxygen, reducing dependence on ground resupply. The module featured a large airlock with a one-metre hatch. A special backpack unit (known as Ikar), an equivalent of the US Manned Maneuvering Unit, was located inside Kvant-2's airlock.

Soyuz TM-9 launched EO-6 crew members Anatoly Solovyev and Aleksandr Balandin on 11 February 1990. While docking, the EO-5 crew noted that three thermal blankets on the ferry were loose, potentially creating problems on reentry, but it was decided that they would be manageable. Their stay on board Mir saw the addition of the Kristall module, launched 31 May 1990. The first docking attempt on 6 June was aborted due to an attitude control thruster failure. Kristall arrived at the front port on 10 June and was relocated to the lateral port opposite Kvant-2 the next day, restoring the equilibrium of the complex. Due to the delay in the docking of Kristall, EO-6 was extended by 10 days to permit the activation of the module's systems and to accommodate an EVA to repair the loose thermal blankets on Soyuz TM-9.

Kristall contained furnaces for use in producing crystals under microgravity conditions (hence the choice of name for the module). The module was also equipped with biotechnology research equipment, including a small greenhouse for plant cultivation experiments which was equipped with a source of light and a feeding system, in addition to equipment for astronomical observations. The most obvious features of the module were the two Androgynous Peripheral Attach System (APAS-89) docking ports designed to be compatible with the Buran spacecraft. Although they were never used in a Buran docking, they were useful later during the Shuttle-Mir programme, providing a berthing location for US Space Shuttles.

The EO-7 relief crew arrived aboard Soyuz TM-10 on 3 August 1990. The new crew arrived at Mir with quail for Kvant-2's cages, one of which laid an egg en route to the station. It was returned to Earth, along with 130 kg of experiment results and industrial products, in Soyuz TM-9. Two more expeditions, EO-8 and EO-9, continued the work of their predecessors whilst tensions grew back on Earth.

==== Post-Soviet period ====
A view of Mir from Soyuz TM-17 on 3 July 1993 showing ongoing docking operations at the station

The EO-10 crew, launched aboard Soyuz TM-13 on 2 October 1991, was the last crew to launch from the USSR and continued the occupation of Mir during the fall of the Soviet Union. The crew launched as Soviet citizens and returned to Earth on 25 March 1992 as Russians. The newly formed Russian Federal Space Agency (Roscosmos) was unable to finance the unlaunched Spektr and Priroda modules, instead putting them into storage and ending Mir's second expansion.

The first human mission flown from an independent Kazakhstan was Soyuz TM-14, launched on 17 March 1992, which carried the EO-11 crew to Mir, docking on 19 March before the departure of Soyuz TM-13. On 17 June, Russian president Boris Yeltsin and US president George H. W. Bush announced what would later become the Shuttle-Mir programme, a cooperative venture which proved useful to the cash-strapped Roskosmos (and led to the eventual completion and launch of Spektr and Priroda). EO-12 followed in July, alongside a brief visit by French astronaut Michel Tognini. The following crew, EO-13, began preparations for the Shuttle-Mir programme by flying to the station in a modified spacecraft, Soyuz TM-16 (launched on 26 January 1993), which was equipped with an APAS-89 docking system rather than the usual probe-and-drogue, enabling it to dock to Kristall and test the port which would later be used by US Space Shuttles. The spacecraft also enabled controllers to obtain data on the dynamics of docking a spacecraft to a space station off the station's longitudinal axis, in addition to data on the structural integrity of this configuration via a test called Rezonans conducted on 28 January. Soyuz TM-15, meanwhile, departed with the EO-12 crew on 1 February.

Throughout the period following the collapse of the USSR, crews on Mir experienced occasional reminders of the economic chaos occurring in Russia. The initial cancellation of Spektr and Priroda was the first such sign, followed by the reduction in communications as a result of the fleet of tracking ships being withdrawn from service by Ukraine. The new Ukrainian government also vastly raised the price of the Kurs docking systems, manufactured in Kyiv – the Russians' attempts to reduce their dependence on Kurs would later lead to accidents during TORU tests in 1997. Various Progress spacecraft had parts of their cargoes missing, either because the consumable in question had been unavailable, or because the ground crews at Baikonur had looted them. The problems became particularly obvious during the launch of the EO-14 crew aboard Soyuz TM-17 in July; shortly before launch there was a black-out at the pad, and the power supply to the nearby city of Leninsk failed an hour after launch. Nevertheless, the spacecraft launched on time and arrived at the station two days later. All of Mir's ports were occupied, and so Soyuz TM-17 had to station-keep 200 metres away from the station for half an hour before docking while Progress M-18 vacated the core module's front port and departed.

The EO-13 crew departed on 22 July, and soon after Mir passed through the annual Perseid meteor shower, during which the station was hit by several particles. A spacewalk was conducted on 28 September to inspect the station's hull, but no serious damage was reported. Soyuz TM-18 arrived on 10 January 1994 carrying the EO-15 crew (including Valeri Polyakov, who was to remain on Mir for 14 months), and Soyuz TM-17 left on 14 January. The undocking was unusual in that the spacecraft was to pass along Kristall to obtain photographs of the APAS to assist in the training of space shuttle pilots. Due to an error in setting up the control system, the spacecraft struck the station a glancing blow during the manoeuvre, scratching the exterior of Kristall.

On 3 February 1994, Mir veteran Sergei Krikalev became the first Russian cosmonaut to launch on a US spacecraft, flying on Space Shuttle Discovery during STS-60.

The launch of Soyuz TM-19, carrying the EO-16 crew, was delayed due to the unavailability of a payload fairing for the booster that was to carry it, but the spacecraft eventually left Earth on 1 July 1994 and docked two days later. They stayed only four months to allow the Soyuz schedule to line up with the planned Space Shuttle manifest, and so Polyakov greeted a second resident crew in October, prior to the undocking of Soyuz TM-19, when the EO-17 crew arrived in Soyuz TM-20.

==== Shuttle–Mir ====
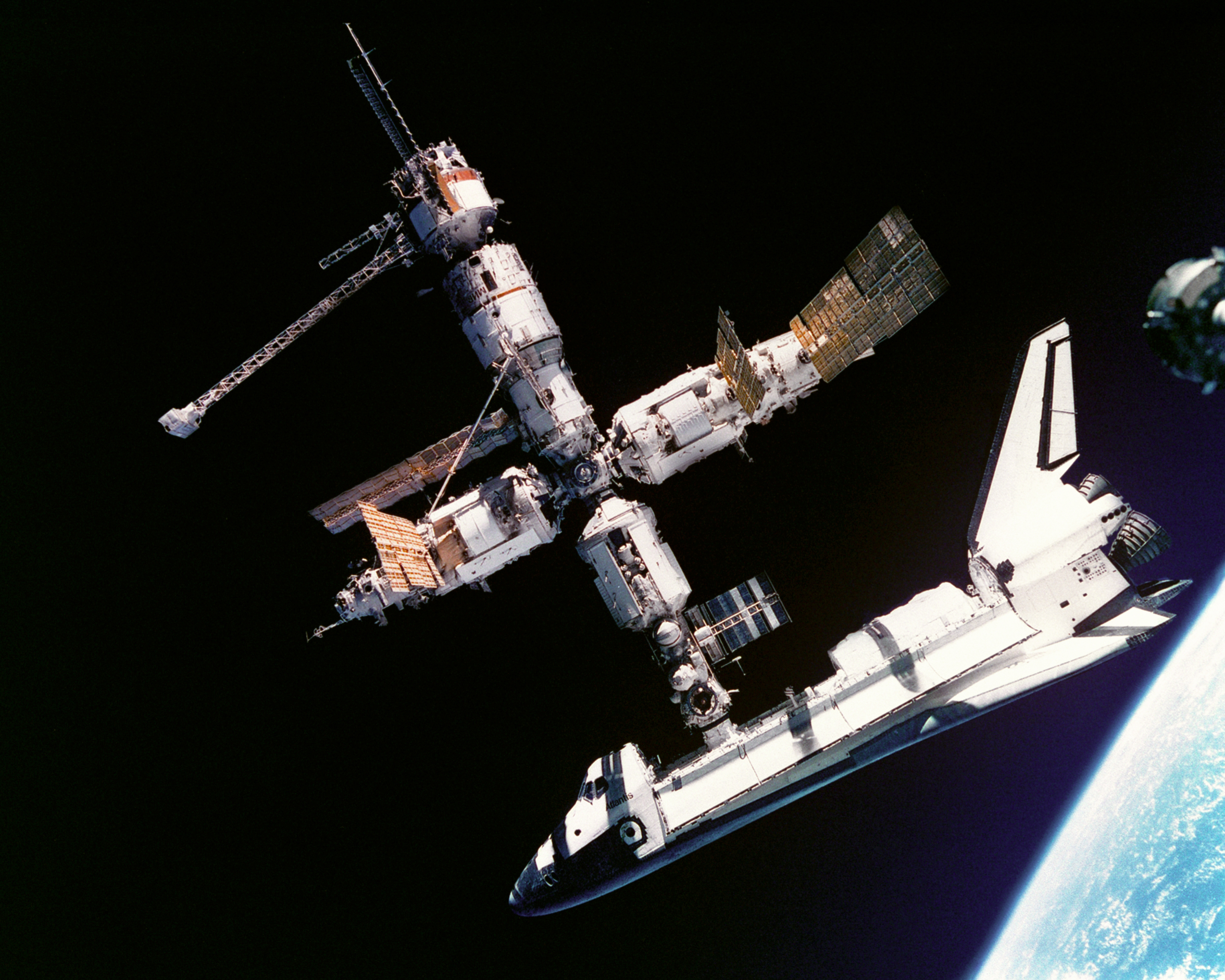
Space Shuttle Atlantis docked to Mir on STS-71

On 3 February 1995, the launch of Space Shuttle Discovery, flying STS-63, opened operations on Mir. Referred to as the "near-Mir" mission, the mission saw the first rendezvous of a Space Shuttle with Mir as the orbiter approached within 37 feet (11 m) of the station as a dress rehearsal for later docking missions and for equipment testing. Five weeks after Discovery's departure, the EO-18 crew, including the first US cosmonaut Norman Thagard, arrived in Soyuz TM-21. The EO-17 crew left a few days later, with Polyakov completing his record-breaking 437-day spaceflight. During EO-18, the Spektr science module (which served as living and working space for American astronauts) was launched aboard a Proton rocket and docked to the station, carrying research equipment from America and other nations. The expedition's crew returned to Earth aboard Space Shuttle Atlantis following the first Shuttle–Mir docking mission, STS-71. Atlantis, launched on 27 June 1995, successfully docked with Mir on 29 June becoming the first US spacecraft to dock with a Russian spacecraft since the ASTP in 1975. The orbiter delivered the EO-19 crew and returned the EO-18 crew to Earth. The EO-20 crew were launched on 3 September, followed in November by the arrival of the docking module during STS-74.

On 21 February 1996, the two-man EO-21 crew was launched aboard Soyuz TM-23, and they were soon joined by US crew member Shannon Lucid, who was brought to the station by Atlantis during STS-76. During this mission, the first joint US spacewalk on Mir took place, deploying the Mir Environmental Effects Payload package for the docking module. Lucid became the first American to carry out a long-duration mission aboard Mir with her 188-day mission, which set the US single spaceflight record. During Lucid's time aboard Mir, Priroda, the station's final module, arrived as did French visitor Claudie Haigneré flying the Cassiopée mission. The flight aboard Soyuz TM-24 also delivered the EO-22 crew of Valery Korzun and Aleksandr Kaleri.

On 16 September 1996, with the launch of Atlantis and the STS-79 flight, Lucid's stay aboard Mir ended. During this fourth docking, John Blaha transferred onto Mir to take his place as resident US astronaut. His stay on the station improved operations in a number of areas, including transfer procedures for a docked space shuttle, "hand-over" procedures for long-duration American crew members, and "ham" amateur radio communications, as well as two spacewalks to reconfigure the station's power grid. Blaha spent four months with the EO-22 crew before returning to Earth aboard Atlantis on STS-81 in January 1997, at which point he was replaced by physician Jerry Linenger. During his flight, Linenger became the first American to conduct a spacewalk from a foreign space station and the first to test the Russian-built Orlan-M spacesuit alongside Russian cosmonaut Vasili Tsibliyev, flying EO-23. All three crew members of EO-23 performed a "fly-around" in Soyuz TM-25 spacecraft. Linenger and his Russian crewmates Vasili Tsibliyev and Aleksandr Lazutkin faced several difficulties during the mission, including the most severe fire aboard an orbiting spacecraft (caused by a malfunctioning Vika), failures of various systems, a near collision with Progress M-33 during a long-distance TORU test and a total loss of station electrical power. The power failure also caused a loss of attitude control, which led to an uncontrolled "tumble" through space.

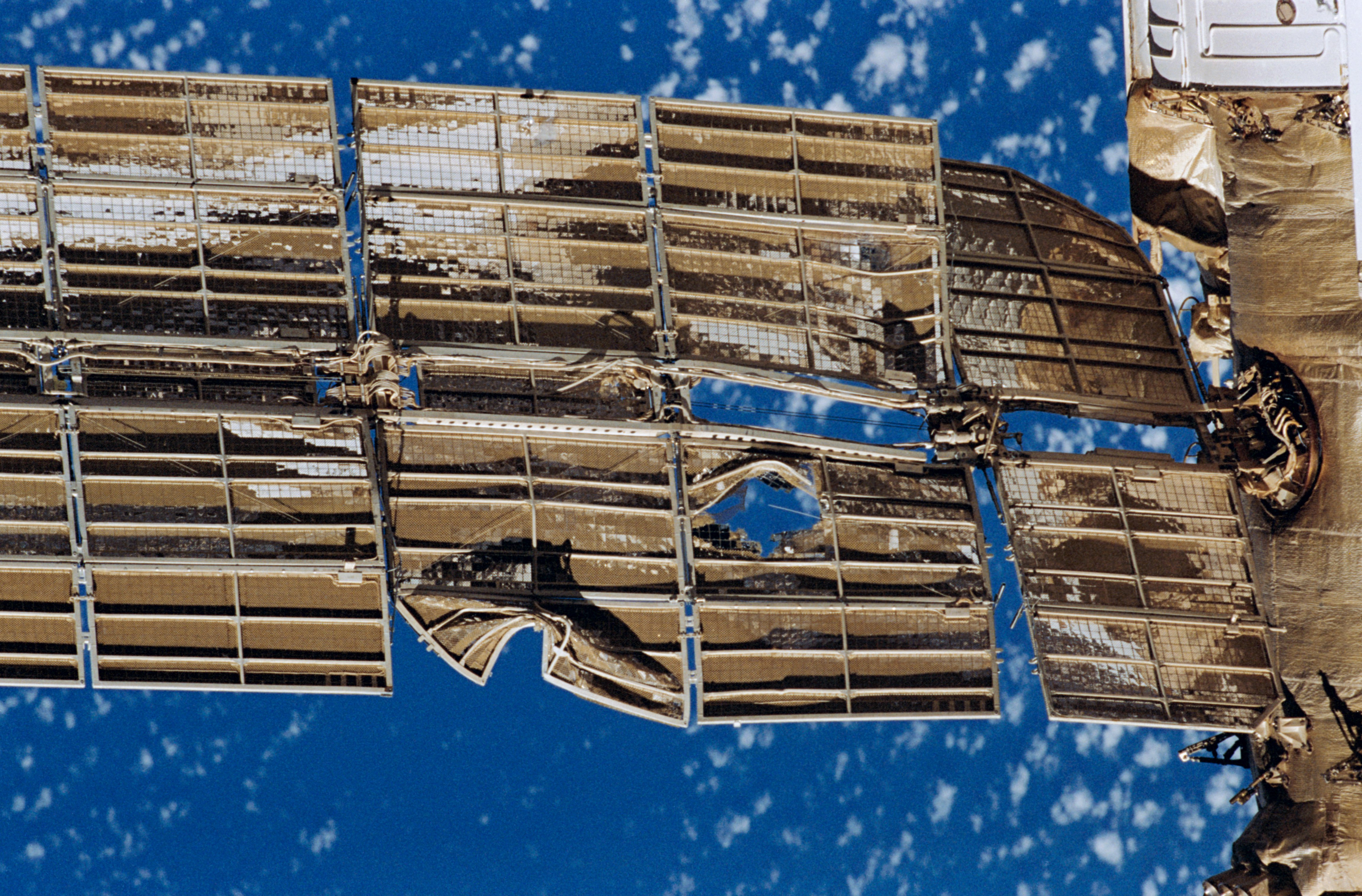
Damaged solar arrays on the Mir Spektr module following a collision with Progress M-34 in September 1997.

Linenger was succeeded by Anglo-American astronaut Michael Foale, carried up by Atlantis on STS-84, alongside Russian mission specialist Elena Kondakova. Foale's increment proceeded fairly normally until 25 June when during the second test of the Progress manual docking system, TORU, Progress M-34 collided with solar arrays on the Spektr module and crashed into the module's outer shell, puncturing the module and causing depressurisation on the station. Only quick actions on the part of the crew, cutting cables leading to the module and closing Spektr's hatch, prevented the crews having to abandon the station in Soyuz TM-25. Their efforts stabilised the station's air pressure, whilst the pressure in Spektr, containing many of Foale's experiments and personal effects, dropped to a vacuum. In an effort to restore some of the power and systems lost following the isolation of Spektr and to attempt to locate the leak, EO-24 commander Anatoly Solovyev and flight engineer Pavel Vinogradov carried out a risky salvage operation later in the flight, entering the empty module during a so-called "intra-vehicular activity" or "IVA" spacewalk and inspecting the condition of hardware and running cables through a special hatch from Spektr's systems to the rest of the station. Following these first investigations, Foale and Solovyev conducted a 6-hour EVA outside Spektr to inspect the damage.

After these incidents, the US Congress and NASA considered whether to abandon the programme out of concern for the astronauts' safety, but NASA administrator Daniel Goldin decided to continue. The next flight to Mir, STS-86, carried David Wolf aboard Atlantis. During the orbiter's stay, Titov and Parazynski conducted a spacewalk to affix a cap to the docking module for a future attempt by crew members to seal the leak in Spektr's hull. Wolf spent 119 days aboard Mir with the EO-24 crew and was replaced during STS-89 with Andy Thomas, who carried out the last US expedition on Mir. The EO-25 crew arrived in Soyuz TM-27 in January 1998 before Thomas returned to Earth on the final Shuttle–Mir mission, STS-91.

==== Final days and deorbit ====
Mir breaks up in Earth's atmosphere over the South Pacific on 23 March 2001.

Following the 8 June 1998 departure of Discovery, the EO-25 crew of Budarin and Musabayev remained on Mir, completing materials experiments and compiling a station inventory. On 2 July, Roskosmos director Yuri Koptev announced that, due to a lack of funding to keep Mir active, the station would be deorbited in June 1999. The EO-26 crew of Gennady Padalka and Sergei Avdeyev arrived on 15 August in Soyuz TM-28, alongside physicist Yuri Baturin, who departed with the EO-25 crew on 25 August in Soyuz TM-27. The crew carried out two spacewalks, one inside Spektr to reseat some power cables and another outside to set up experiments delivered by Progress M-40, which also carried a large amount of propellant to begin alterations to Mir's orbit in preparation for the station's decommissioning. 20 November 1998 saw the launch of Zarya, the first module of the ISS, but delays to the new station's service module Zvezda had led to calls for Mir to be kept in orbit past 1999. Roscosmos confirmed that it would not fund Mir past the set deorbit date.

The crew of EO-27, Viktor Afanasyev and Jean-Pierre Haigneré, arrived in Soyuz TM-29 on 22 February 1999 alongside Ivan Bella, who returned to Earth with Padalka in Soyuz TM-28. The crew carried out three EVAs to retrieve experiments and deploy a prototype communications antenna on Sofora. On 1 June it was announced that the deorbit of the station would be delayed by six months to allow time to seek alternative funding to keep the station operating. The rest of the expedition was spent preparing the station for its deorbit; a special analog computer was installed and each of the modules, starting with the docking module, was mothballed in turn and sealed off. The crew loaded their results into Soyuz TM-29 and departed Mir on 28 August 1999, ending a run of continuous occupation, which had lasted for eight days short of ten years. The station's control moment gyroscopes (CMGs, or "gyrodynes") and main computer were shut down on 7 September, leaving Progress M-42 to control Mir and refine the station's orbital decay rate.

Near the end of its life, there were plans for private interests to purchase Mir, possibly for use as the first orbital television/movie studio. The privately funded Soyuz TM-30 mission by MirCorp, that was launched on 4 April 2000, carried two crew members, Sergei Zalyotin and Aleksandr Kaleri, to the station for two months to do repair work with the hope of proving that the station could be made safe. This was to be the last crewed mission to Mir—while Russia was optimistic about Mir's future, its commitments to the ISS project left no funding to support the aging station.

Mir's deorbit was carried out in three stages. The first stage involved waiting for atmospheric drag to reduce the station's orbit to an average of 220 kilometres (140 mi). This began with the docking of Progress M1-5, a modified version of the Progress-M carrying 2.5 times more fuel in place of supplies. The second stage was the transfer of the station into a 165 km × 220 km (103 mi × 137 mi) orbit. This was achieved with two burns of Progress M1-5's control engines at 00:32 UTC and 02:01 UTC on 23 March 2001. After a two-orbit pause, the third and final stage of the deorbit began with the burn of Progress M1-5's control engines and main engine at 05:08 UTC, lasting 22+ minutes. Atmospheric reentry (arbitrarily defined beginning at 100 km (62 mi)AMSL) occurred at 05:44 UTC near Nadi, Fiji. Major destruction of the station began around 05:52 UTC and most of the unburned fragments fell into the South Pacific Ocean around 06:00 UTC.

=== Visiting spacecraft ===
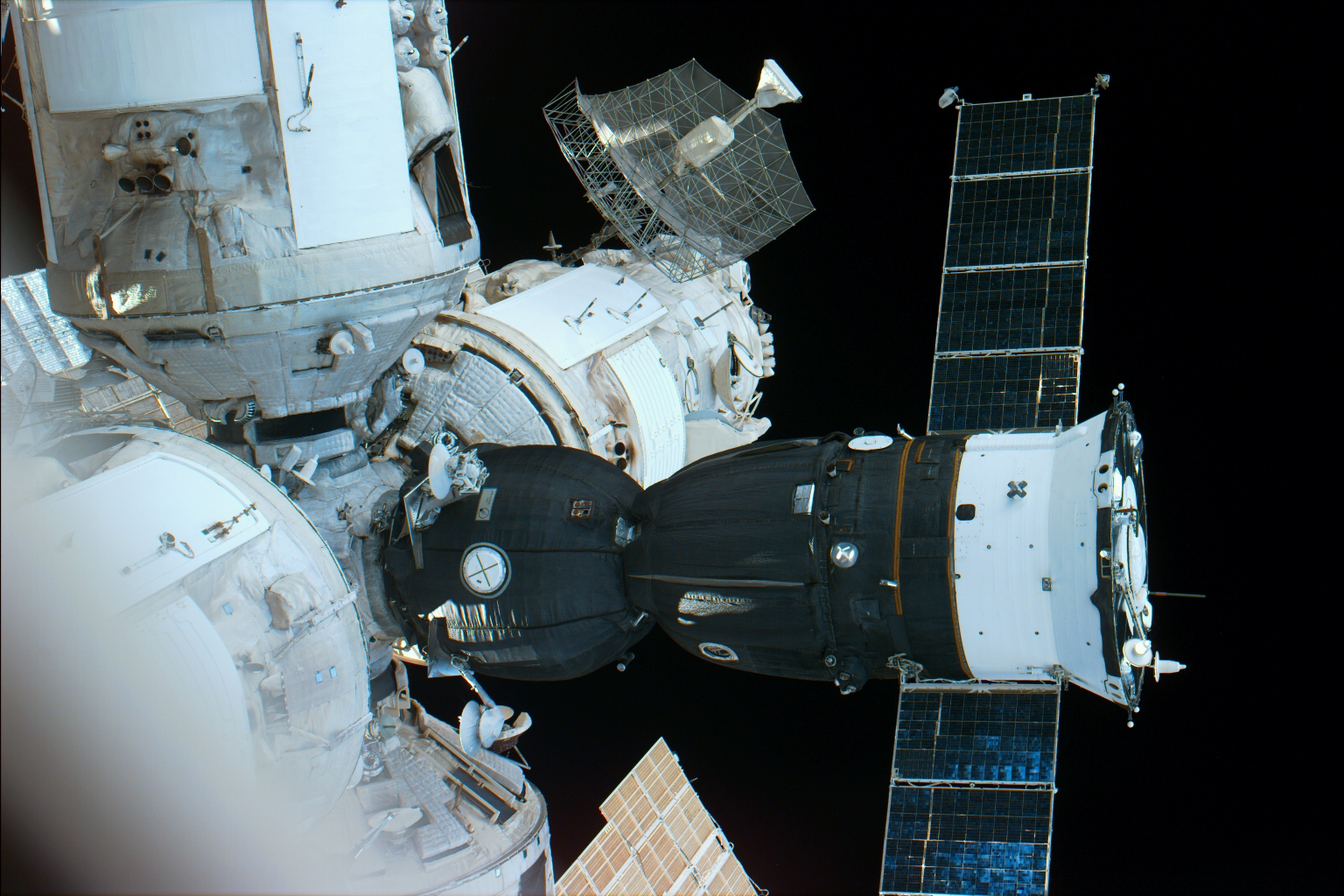
Soyuz TM-24 docked with Mir as seen from the Space Shuttle Atlantis during STS-79

Mir was primarily supported by the Russian Soyuz and Progress spacecraft and had two ports available for docking them. Initially, the fore and aft ports of the core module could be used for dockings, but following the permanent berthing of Kvant-1 to the aft port in 1987, the rear port of the new module took on this role from the core module's aft port. Each port was equipped with the plumbing required for Progress cargo ferries to replace the station's fluids and also the guidance systems needed to guide the spacecraft for docking. Two such systems were used on Mir; the rear ports of both the core module and Kvant-1 were equipped with both the Igla and Kurs systems, whilst the core module's forward port featured only the newer Kurs.

Soyuz spacecraft provided personnel access to and from the station allowing for crew rotations and cargo return, and also functioned as a lifeboat for the station, allowing for a relatively quick return to Earth in the event of an emergency. Two models of Soyuz flew to Mir; Soyuz T-15 was the only Igla-equipped Soyuz-T to visit the station, whilst all other flights used the newer, Kurs-equipped Soyuz-TM. A total of 31 (30 crewed, 1 uncrewed) Soyuz spacecraft flew to the station over a 14-year period.

The uncrewed Progress cargo vehicles were only used to resupply the station, carrying a variety of cargoes including water, fuel, food and experimental equipment. The spacecraft were not equipped with reentry shielding and so, unlike their Soyuz counterparts, were incapable of surviving reentry. As a result, when its cargo had been unloaded, each Progress was refilled with rubbish, spent equipment and other waste which was destroyed, along with the Progress itself, on reentry. To facilitate cargo return, ten Progress flights carried Raduga capsules, which could return around 150 kg of experimental results to Earth automatically. Mir was visited by three separate models of Progress; the original 7K-TG variant equipped with Igla (18 flights), the Progress-M model equipped with Kurs (43 flights), and the modified Progress-M1 version (3 flights), which together flew a total of 64 resupply missions. Whilst the Progress spacecraft usually docked automatically without incident, the station was equipped with a remote manual docking system, TORU, in case problems were encountered during the automatic approaches. With TORU, cosmonauts could guide the spacecraft safely in to dock (with the exception of the catastrophic docking of Progress M-34, when the long-range use of the system resulted in the spacecraft striking the station, damaging Spektr and causing decompression).

In addition to the routine Soyuz and Progress flights, it was anticipated that Mir would also be the destination for flights by the Soviet Buran space shuttle, which was intended to deliver extra modules (based on the same "37K" bus as Kvant-1) and provide a much improved cargo return service to the station. Kristall carried two Androgynous Peripheral Attach System (APAS-89) docking ports designed to be compatible with the shuttle. One port was to be used for Buran; the other for the planned Pulsar X-2 telescope, also to be delivered by Buran. The cancellation of the Buran programme meant these capabilities were not realised until the 1990s when the ports were used instead by US Space Shuttles as part of the Shuttle-Mir programme (after testing by the specially modified Soyuz TM-16 in 1993). Initially, visiting Space Shuttle orbiters docked directly to Kristall, but this required the relocation of the module to ensure sufficient distance between the shuttle and Mir's solar arrays. To eliminate the need to move the module and retract solar arrays for clearance issues, a Mir Docking Module was later added to the end of Kristall. The shuttles provided crew rotation of the American astronauts on station and carried cargo to and from the station, performing some of the largest transfers of cargo of the time. With a space shuttle docked to Mir, the temporary enlargements of living and working areas amounted to a complex that was the largest spacecraft in history at that time, with a combined mass of 250 tonnes (280 short tons).

=== Mission control centre ===
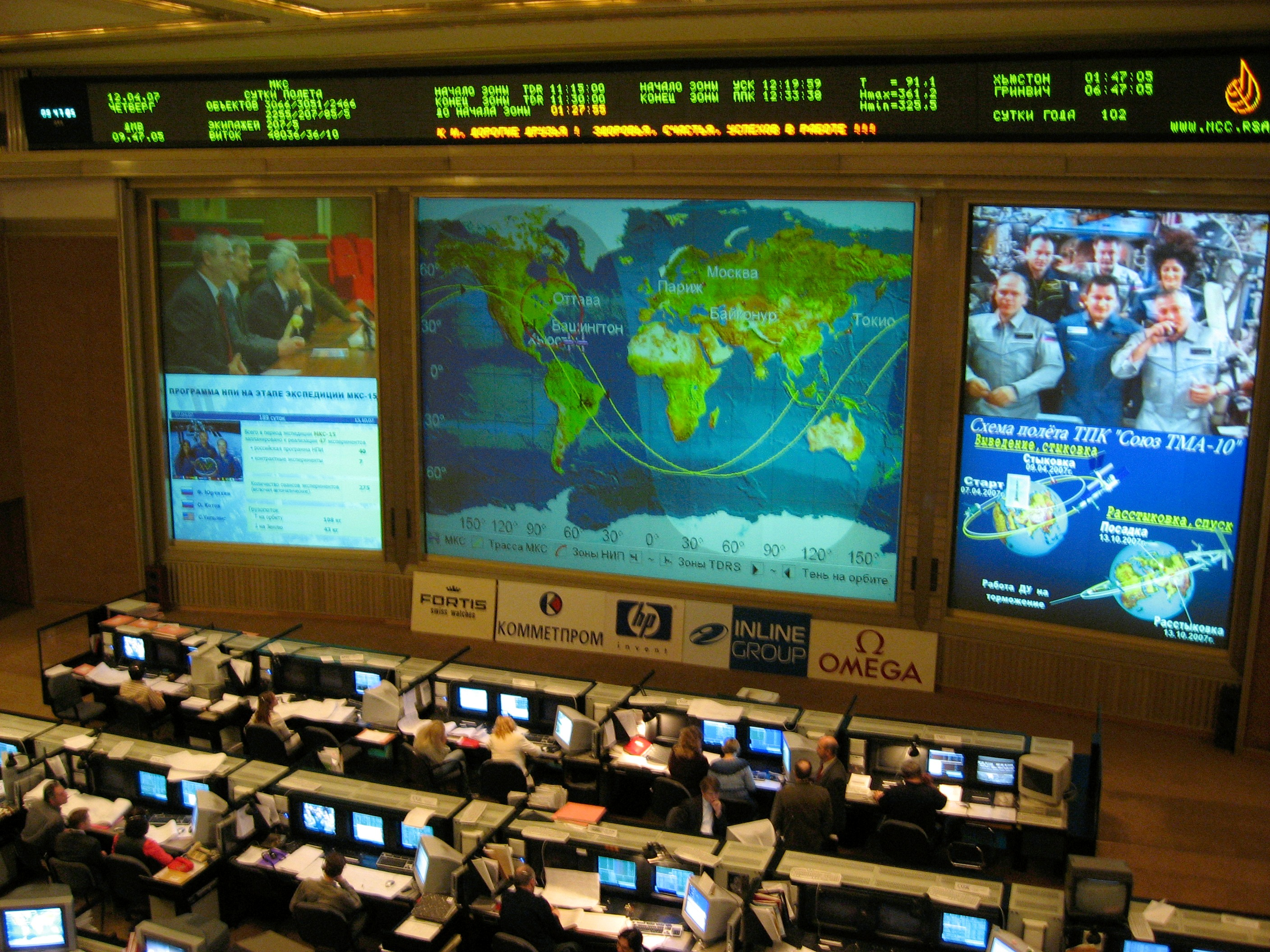
RKA Mission Control Center (2007)

Mir and its resupply missions were controlled from the Russian mission control centre (Russian: Центр управления полётами) in Korolyov, near the RKK Energia plant. Referred to by its acronym ЦУП ("TsUP"), or simply as 'Moscow', the facility could process data from up to ten spacecraft in three separate control rooms, although each control room was dedicated to a single programme; one to Mir; one to Soyuz; and one to the Soviet space shuttle Buran (which was later converted for use with the ISS). The facility is now used to control the Russian Orbital Segment of the ISS. The flight control team were assigned roles similar to the system used by NASA at their mission control centre in Houston, including:

- The Flight Director, who provided policy guidance and communicated with the mission management team;
- The Flight Shift Director, who was responsible for real-time decisions within a set of flight rules;
- The Mission Deputy Shift Manager (MDSM) for the MCC was responsible for the control room's consoles, computers and peripherals;
- The MDSM for Ground Control was responsible for communications;
- The MDSM for Crew Training was similar to NASA's 'capcom,' or capsule communicator; usually someone who had served as the Mir crew's lead trainer.

=== Unused equipment ===
Three command and control modules were constructed for the Mir program. One was used in space; one remained in a Moscow warehouse as a source of repair parts if needed, and the third was sold to an educational and entertainment complex in the US in 1997. Tommy Bartlett Exploratory purchased the unit and had it shipped to Wisconsin Dells, Wisconsin, where it became the centrepiece of the complex's Space Exploration wing.

=== Safety aspects ===
==== Ageing systems and atmosphere ====
In the later years of the programme, particularly during the Shuttle-Mir programme, Mir suffered from various systems failures. It had been designed for five years of use, but eventually flew for fifteen, and in the 1990s was showing its age, with frequent computer crashes, loss of power, uncontrolled tumbles through space and leaking pipes. Jerry Linenger in his book about his time on the facility says that the cooling system had developed tiny leaks too small and numerous to be repaired, that permitted the constant release of coolant. He says that it was especially noticeable after he had made a spacewalk and become used to the bottled air in his spacesuit. When he returned to the station and again began breathing the air inside Mir, he was shocked by the intensity of the smell and worried about the possible negative health effects of breathing such contaminated air.

Various breakdowns of the Elektron oxygen-generating system were a concern; they led crews to become increasingly reliant on the backup Vika solid-fuel oxygen generator (SFOG) systems, which led to a fire during the handover between EO-22 and EO-23. (see also ISS ECLSS)

==== Accidents ====
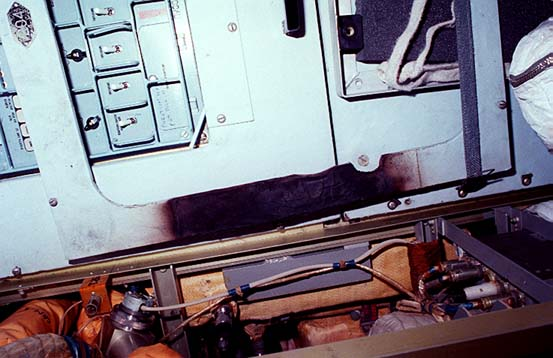
A charred panel in Kvant-1 following the Vika fire

Several accidents occurred which threatened the station's safety, such as the glancing collision between Kristall and Soyuz TM-17 during proximity operations in January 1994. The three most alarming incidents occurred during EO-23. The first was on 23 February 1997 during the handover period from EO-22 to EO-23, when a malfunction occurred in the backup Vika system, a chemical oxygen generator later known as solid-fuel oxygen generator (SFOG). The Vika malfunction led to a fire which burned for around 90 seconds (according to official sources at the TsUP; astronaut Jerry Linenger insists the fire burned for around 14 minutes), and produced large amounts of toxic smoke that filled the station for around 45 minutes. This forced the crew to don respirators, but some of the respirator masks initially worn were broken. Some of the fire extinguishers mounted on the walls of the newer modules were immovable.

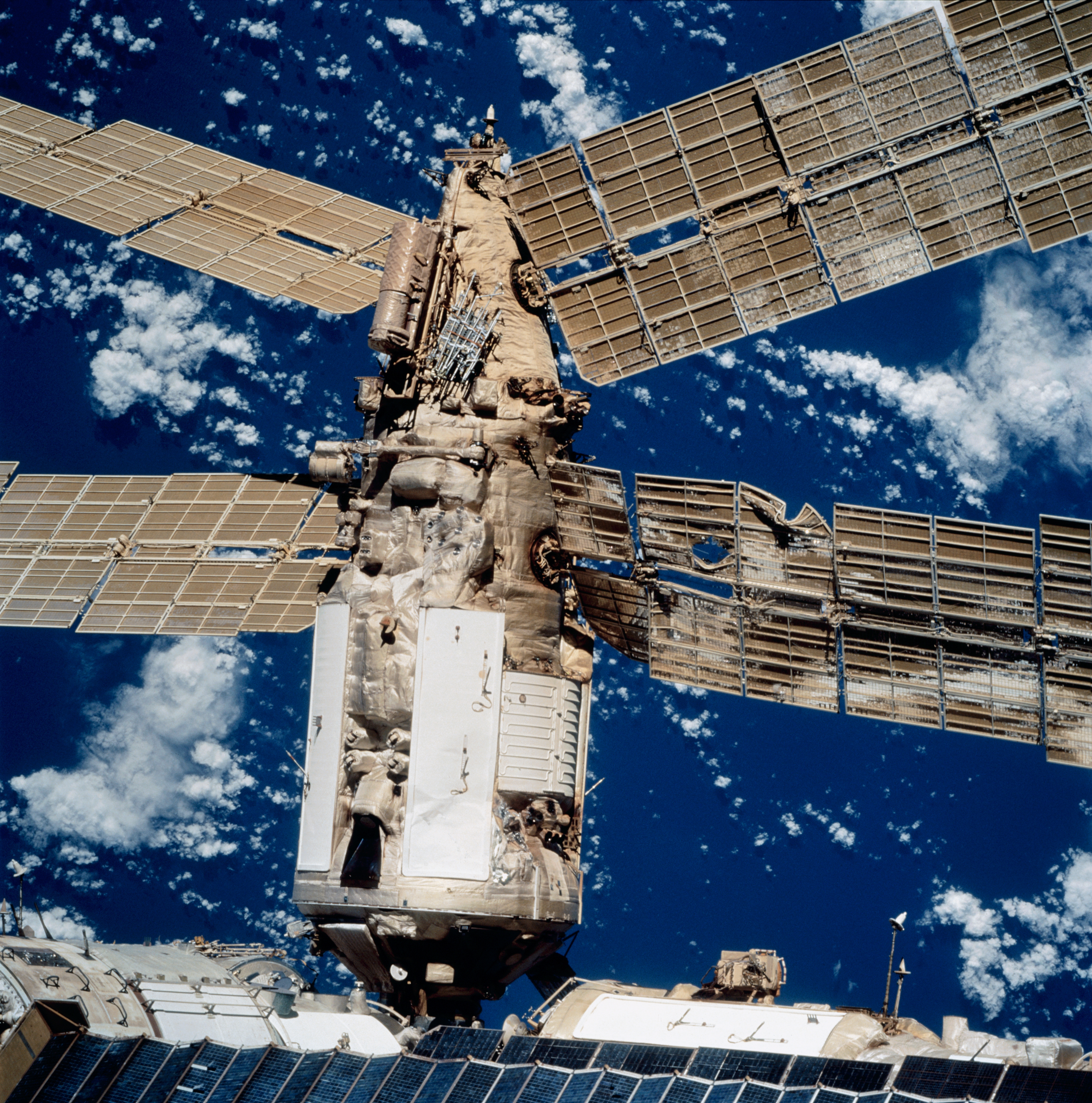
Picture of the damage caused by the collision with Progress M-34. Picture was taken by Space Shuttle Atlantis during STS 86

The other two accidents concerned testing of the station's TORU manual docking system to manually dock Progress M-33 and Progress M-34. The tests were to gauge the performance of long-distance docking and the feasibility of removal of the expensive Kurs automatic docking system from Progress spacecraft. Due to malfunctioning equipment, both tests failed, with Progress M-33 narrowly missing the station and Progress M-34 striking Spektr and puncturing the module, causing the station to depressurise and leading to Spektr being permanently sealed off. This in turn led to a power crisis aboard Mir as the module's solar arrays produced a large proportion of the station's electrical supply, causing the station to power down and begin to drift, requiring weeks of work to rectify before work could continue as normal.

==== Radiation and orbital debris ====
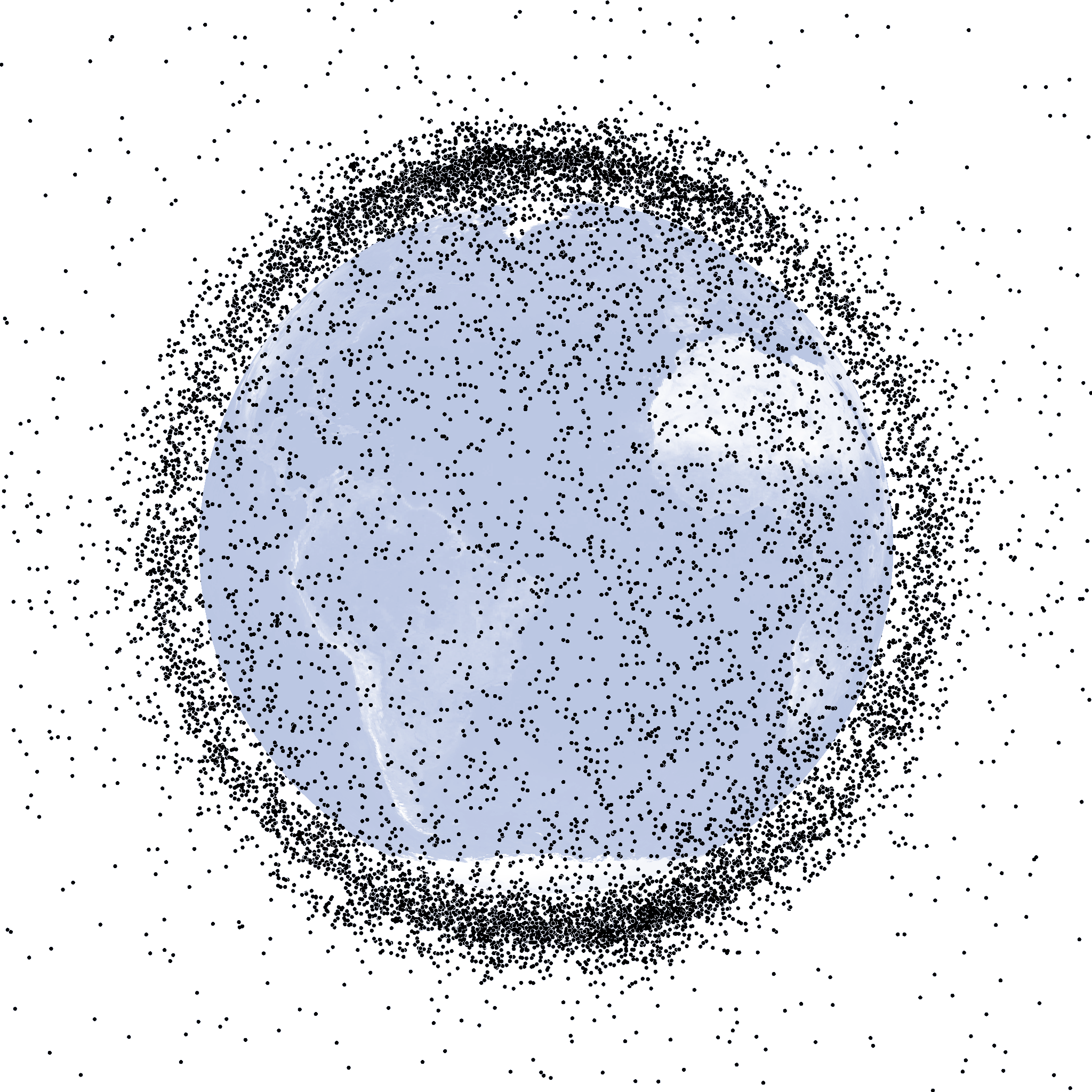
Space debris in low Earth orbit

Without the protection of the Earth's atmosphere, cosmonauts were exposed to higher levels of radiation from a steady flux of cosmic rays and trapped protons from the South Atlantic Anomaly. The station's crews were exposed to an absorbed dose of about 5.2 cGy over the course of the Mir EO-18 expedition, producing an equivalent dose of 14.75 cSv, or 1133 μSv per day. This daily dose is approximately that received from natural background radiation on Earth in two years. The radiation environment of the station was not uniform; closer proximity to the station's hull led to an increased radiation dose, and the strength of radiation shielding varied between modules; Kvant-2's being better than the core module, for instance.

The increased radiation levels pose a higher risk of crews developing cancer, and can cause damage to the chromosomes of lymphocytes. These cells are central to the immune system and so any damage to them could contribute to the lowered immunity experienced by cosmonauts. Over time, in theory, lowered immunity results in the spread of infection between crew members, especially in such confined areas. To avoid this only healthy people were permitted aboard. Radiation has also been linked to a higher incidence of cataracts in cosmonauts. Protective shielding and protective drugs may lower the risks to an acceptable level, but data is scarce and longer-term exposure will result in greater risks.

At the low altitudes at which Mir orbited there is a variety of space debris, consisting of everything from entire spent rocket stages and defunct satellites, to explosion fragments, paint flakes, slag from solid rocket motors, coolant released by RORSAT nuclear powered satellites, small needles, and many other objects. These objects, in addition to natural micrometeoroids, posed a threat to the station as they could puncture pressurised modules and cause damage to other parts of the station, such as the solar arrays. Micrometeoroids also posed a risk to spacewalking cosmonauts, as such objects could puncture their spacesuits, causing them to depressurise. Meteor showers in particular posed a risk, and, during such storms, the crews slept in their Soyuz ferries to facilitate an emergency evacuation should Mir be damaged.

== See also ==
- Orphans of Apollo, a 2008 documentary film which describes how a band of entrepreneurs tried to privatize the space station Mir and the resulting story of MirCorp.
- Out of the Present, 1995 documentary

== Footnotes ==
Preceded by Salyut 7	Mir; 1986–2001	Succeeded by Mir-2 as the ROS in the ISS
