= Progress M-34 =

Russian uncrewed cargo spacecraft of 1997

- Mission type: Mir resupply
- COSPAR ID: 1997-014A
- SATCAT no.: 24757

Spacecraft properties
- Spacecraft type: Progress-M 11F615A55
- Manufacturer: NPO Energia
- Launch mass: 7,156 kilograms (15,776 lb)

Start of mission
- Launch date: 6 April 1997, 16:04:05 UTC
- Rocket: Soyuz-U
- Launch site: Baikonur Site 1/5

End of mission
- Disposal: Deorbited
- Decay date: 2 July 1997, 06:31:50 UTC

Orbital parameters
- Reference system: Geocentric
- Regime: Low Earth
- Inclination: 51.6 degrees

Docking with Mir
- Docking port: Kvant-1 Aft
- Docking date: 8 April 1997, 17:30:01 UTC
- Undocking date: 24 June 1997, 10:22:45 UTC
- Time docked: 76.7 days

Docking with Mir
- Docking port: Kvant-1 Aft
- Docking date: 25 June 1997, c.09:20 UTC; Docking failed

Drawing of a Progress-M spacecraft

Progress M-34 (Russian: Прогресс М-34) was a Russian uncrewed cargo spacecraft which was launched in 1997 to resupply the Mir space station, and which subsequently collided with Mir during a docking attempt, resulting in significant damage to the space station.

== Spacecraft ==
The 52nd of 64 Progress spacecraft to visit Mir, it used the Progress-M 11F615A55 configuration, and had the serial number 234. It carried supplies including food, water, and oxygen for the EO-23 crew aboard Mir, as well as equipment for conducting scientific research, and fuel for adjusting the station's orbit and performing maneuvers. Among its cargo were two new spacesuits, three fire extinguishers, oxygen candles, and equipment to facilitate repairs to Mir's life support system.

== Launch and docking ==
Progress M-34 was launched at 16:04:05 UTC on 6 April 1997, atop a Soyuz-U carrier rocket flying from Site 1/5 at the Baikonur Cosmodrome. Following two days of free flight, it docked with the Aft port of Mir's Kvant-1 module at 17:30:01 GMT on 8 April.

== Collision ==
Progress M-34 undocked from Mir at 10:22:45 UTC on 24 June 1997, in preparation for a docking test planned for the next day. On 25 June 1997, the spacecraft re-approached Mir under manual control (TORU), in a test intended to establish whether Russia could reduce the cost of Progress missions by eliminating the Kurs automated docking system. At 09:18 UTC, whilst under the control of Vasily Tsibliyev, the Progress spacecraft collided with the space station's Spektr module, damaging both the module itself, and a solar panel. Following the collision, Progress M-34 was manoeuvred away from the station, before being deorbited on 2 July. Its deorbit burn was conducted at 05:34:58 UTC, with the spacecraft being destroyed during reentry over the Pacific Ocean at 06:31:50.

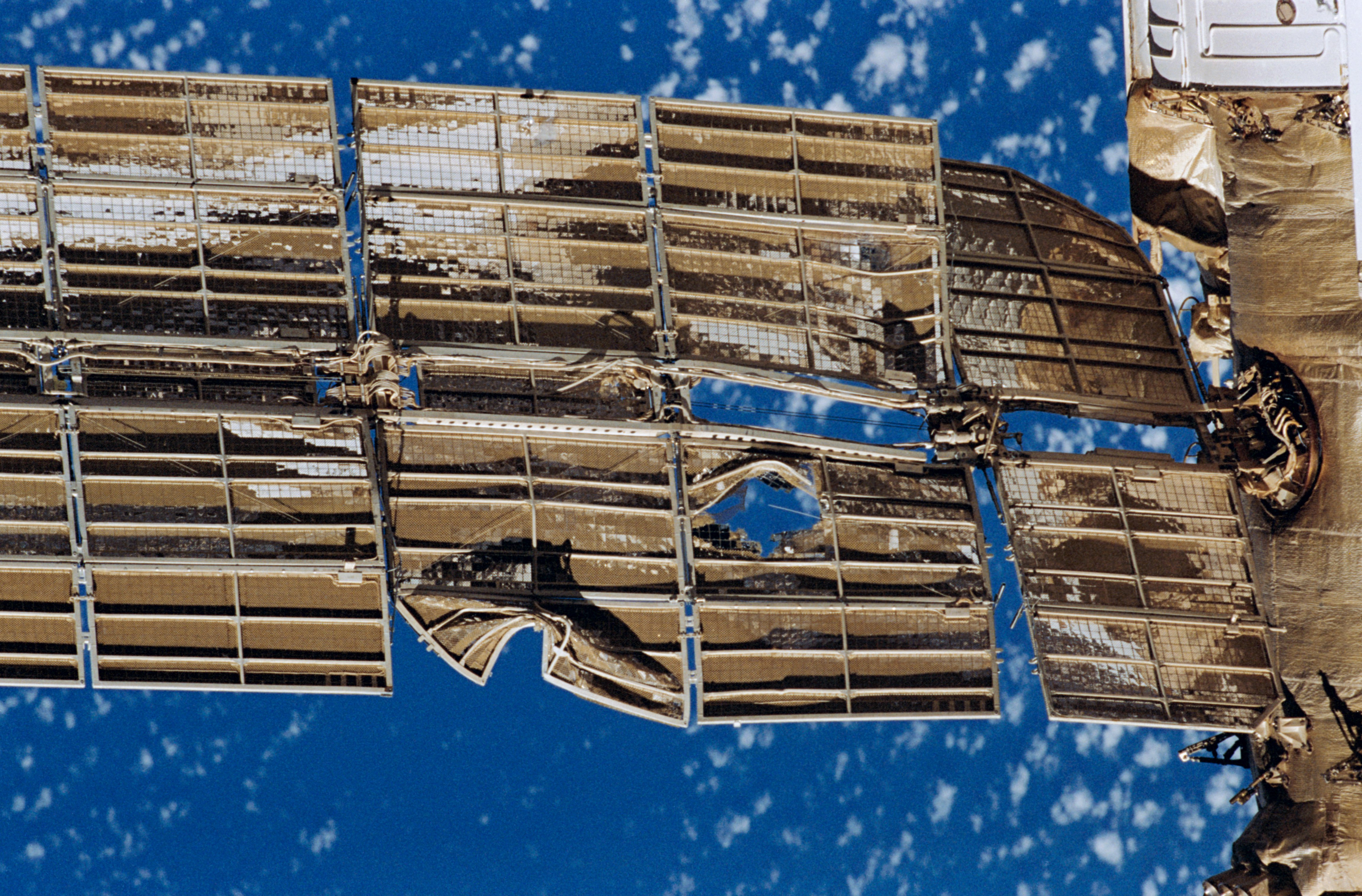
The damaged solar array of the Spektr module following the collision between Mir and the Progress M-34 freighter on 25 June 1997

== See also ==
- 1997 in spaceflight
- List of Progress flights
- List of uncrewed spaceflights to Mir
