= Soyuz TM-25 =

1997 Russian crewed spaceflight to Mir

- Operator: Rosaviakosmos
- COSPAR ID: 1997-003A
- SATCAT no.: 24717
- Mission duration: 184 days, 22 hours, 7 minutes, 40 seconds
- Orbits completed: ~2,950

Spacecraft properties
- Spacecraft type: Soyuz-TM
- Manufacturer: RKK Energia
- Launch mass: 7,150 kilograms (15,760 lb)

Crew
- Crew size: 3 up 2 down
- Members: Vasili Tsibliyev; Aleksandr Lazutkin
- Launching: Reinhold Ewald
- Callsign: Си́риус (Sirius)

Start of mission
- Launch date: February 10, 1997, 14:09:30 UTC
- Rocket: Soyuz-U

End of mission
- Landing date: August 14, 1997, 12:17:10 UTC
- Landing site: 170 kilometres (110 mi) SE of Dzhezkazgan

Orbital parameters
- Reference system: Geocentric
- Regime: Low Earth
- Perigee altitude: 378 kilometres (235 mi)
- Apogee altitude: 394 kilometres (245 mi)
- Inclination: 51.56 degrees

Docking with Mir
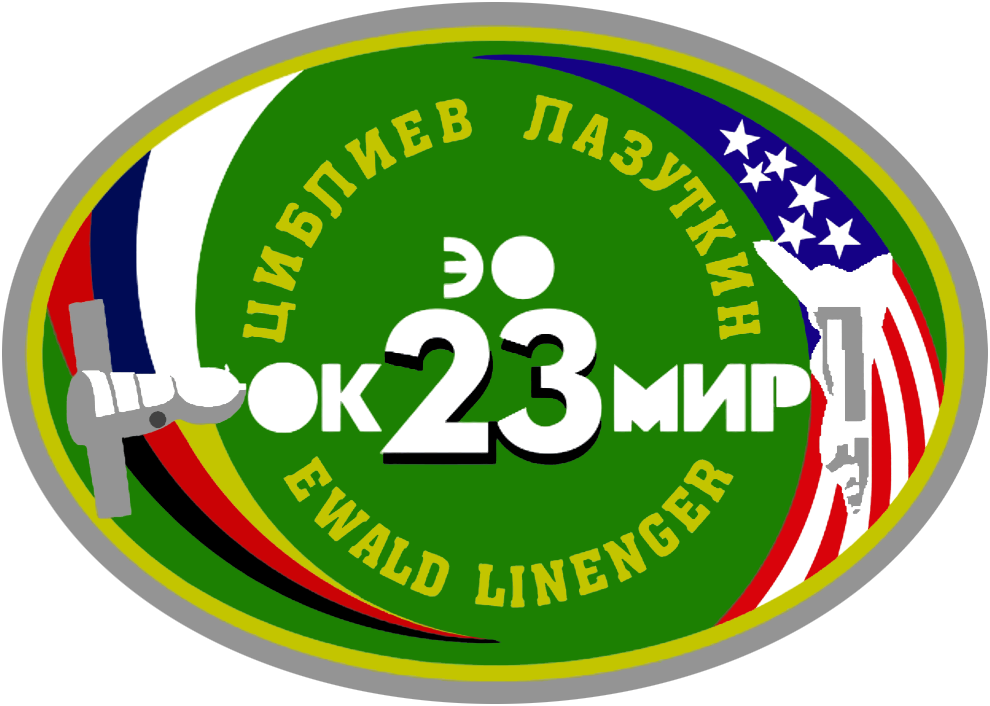
- Soyuz programme (Crewed missions)

Soyuz TM-25 was a crewed Soyuz spaceflight, which launched on February 10, 1997. It transported Russian cosmonauts Vasily Tsibliyev, Aleksandr Lazutkin, and German cosmonaut Reinhold Ewald to Mir.

== Crew ==
Position	Launching crew	Landing crew
Commander	Vasili Tsibliyev; Second and last spaceflight	
Flight engineer	Aleksandr Lazutkin; Only spaceflight	
Research cosmonaut	Reinhold Ewald, DLR; Only spaceflight	None

== Mission highlights ==
This was the 30th expedition to Mir. An ESA astronaut from Germany was included on the mission.

Soyuz TM-25 is a Russian spacecraft that was launched to carry astronauts and supplies to Mir station. It was launched by a Soyuz-U rocket from Baykonur cosmodrome at 14:09 UT to ferry three cosmonauts for a 162-day stay at the station; it docked with the station at 15:51 UT on 12 February 97. Within meters of automatic approach to the station, a slight misalignment was noted, and the commander of the module had to dock it by manual steering.
