= Reinhold Ewald =

German physicist and astronaut (born 1956)

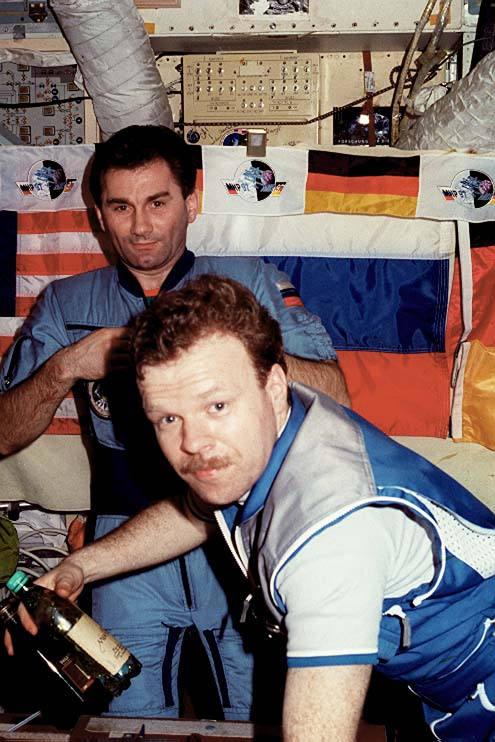
- Born: 18 December 1956 (age 69); Mönchengladbach, West Germany
- Occupation: Physicist
- Space career

DFVLR/ESA astronaut
- Time in space: 19d 16h 34min
- Selection: 1990 German Group
- Missions: Soyuz TM-25 / Soyuz TM-24

Reinhold Ewald (born 18 December 1956) is a German physicist and ESA astronaut.

== Biography ==
Born in Mönchengladbach, West Germany, he received a Diploma in experimental physics from the University of Cologne in 1983 and a Ph.D. in 1986, with a minor degree in human physiology.

In 1990, he was selected to the German astronaut team, training for the Mir '92 mission. He was the backup of Klaus-Dietrich Flade for the Soyuz TM-14 mission. In 1995 he began training for the second German Mir mission. In February 1997 he flew to the space station Mir with Soyuz TM-25, spending 20 days in space. He performed experiments in biomedical and material sciences, and carried out operational tests in preparation for the International Space Station.

In February 1999, he joined the European Astronaut Corps at the European Astronaut Centre (EAC) in Cologne, Germany.

From 2006 to 2011, Ewald headed the Flight Operations Division within ESA's ISS Operations department at the Columbus Control Centre near Munich. In this role, he directed a team of ESA Mission Directors managing the Columbus laboratory delivery flight in February 2008 and the Columbus science activities thereafter.

He served as an Advisor to the Head of Director General's Cabinet at ESA's headquarters in Paris from 2011 to 2014, followed by a position at the European Astronaut Centre in Cologne, promoting the scientific achievements of the ESA research programme on the International Space Station.

In September 2015 he was appointed as Professor for Astronautics and Space Stations at the Institute of Space Systems (IRS) at the University of Stuttgart as the successor to Ernst Messerschmid.
