= Stephen Daley =

Stephen Daley may refer to:

- Stephen Daley (cricketer), Australian scientific researcher, veterinarian and cricketer
- Stephen Daley (American football), American football player

== See also ==
- Steve Daley, English footballer
- Steve Daley (journalist), American newspaper journalist
