= Eileen Collins =

American astronaut and test pilot (born 1956)

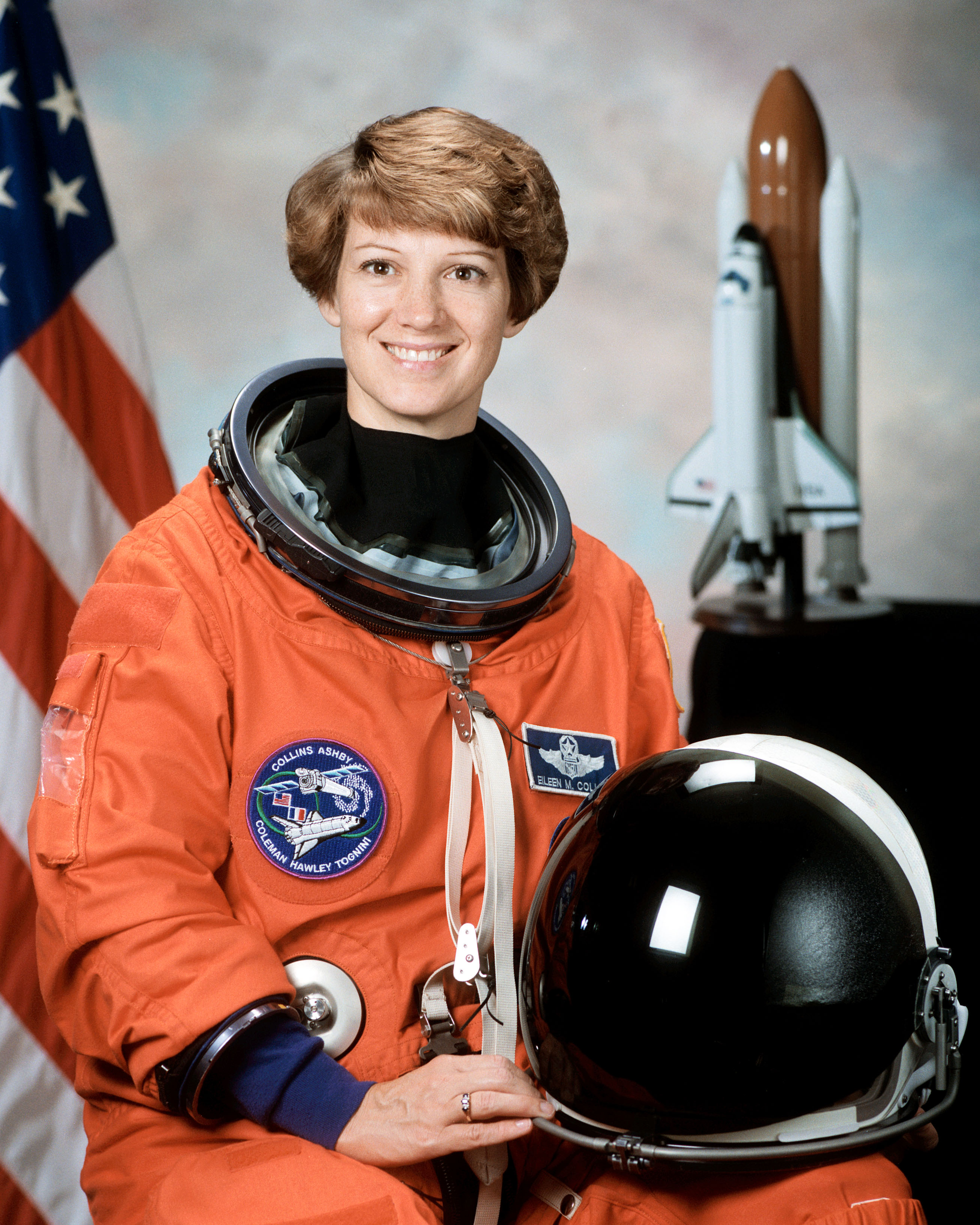
- Collins in 1998
- Born: Eileen Marie Collins; 19 November 1956 (age 69); Elmira, New York, U.S.
- Education: Corning Community College (AA); Syracuse University (BA); Stanford University (MS); Webster University (MA)
- Awards: Distinguished Flying Cross; Legion of Merit; Defense Meritorious Service Medal; Meritorious Service Medal (2); Air Force Commendation Medal (2); NASA Distinguished Service Medal; NASA Outstanding Leadership Medal; NASA Exceptional Service Medal; NASA Exceptional Public Service Medal; NASA Space Flight Medal (4)
- Space career

NASA astronaut
- Rank: Colonel, USAF
- Time in space: 36d 7h 11m
- Selection: NASA Group 13 (1990)
- Missions: STS-63; STS-84; STS-93; STS-114
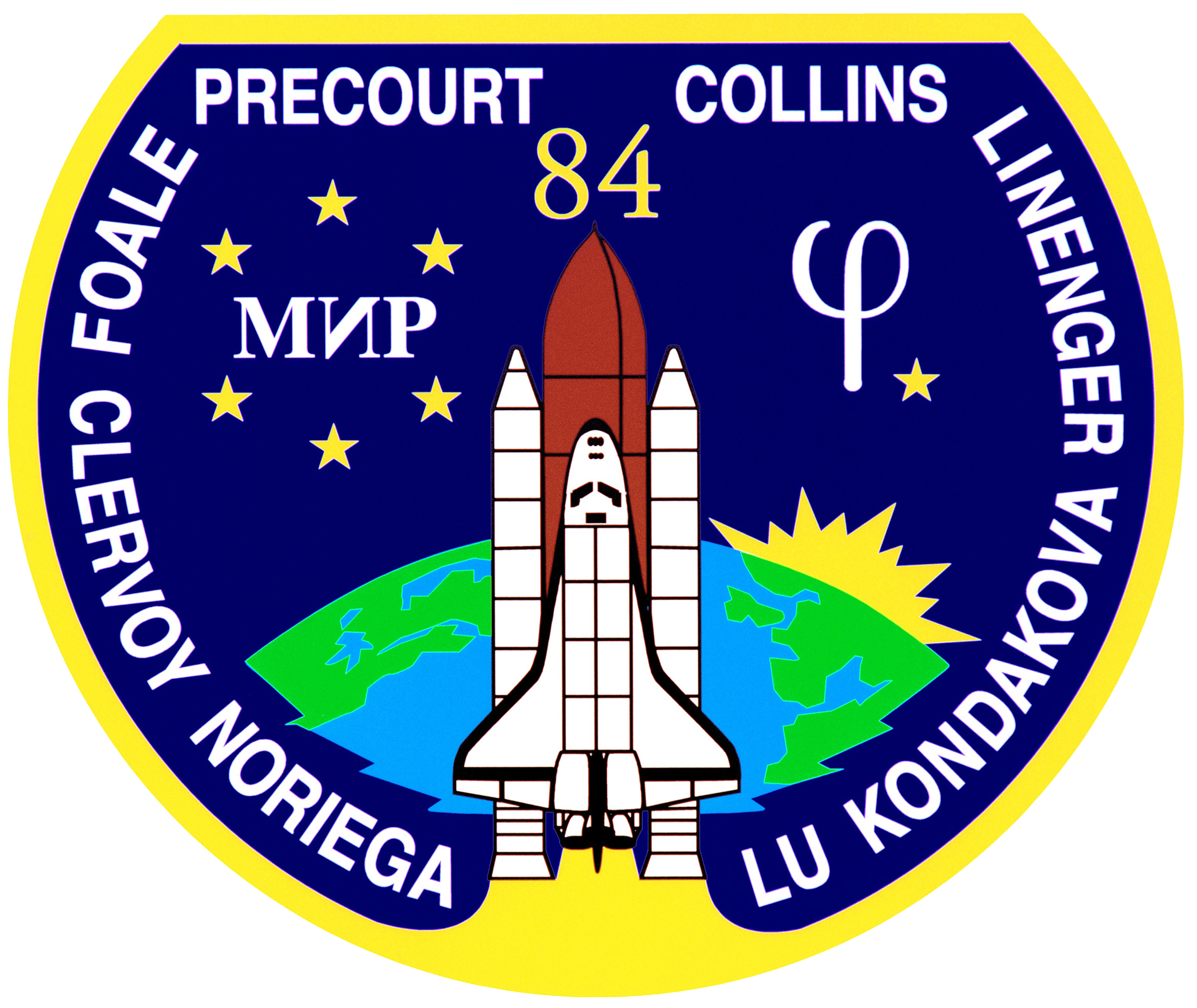
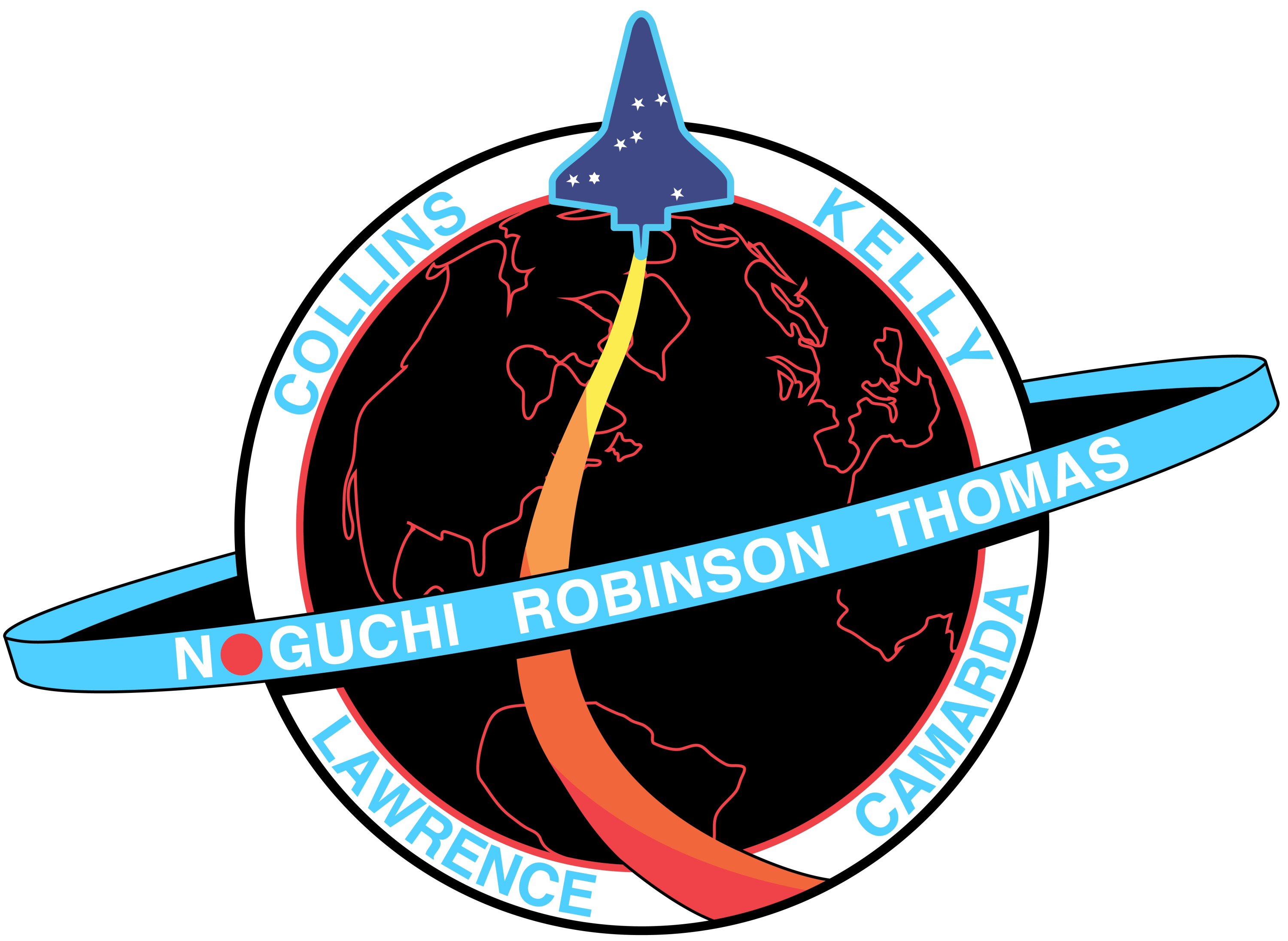
- Mission insignia
- Retired: 1 May 2006
- Military career
- Service years: 1978–2005
- Conflicts: United States invasion of Grenada
- Website: https://www.eileencollins.com/

Eileen Marie Collins (born 19 November 1956) is an American retired NASA astronaut and Air Force colonel. A flight instructor and test pilot, Collins was the first woman to pilot the Space Shuttle and the first to command a Space Shuttle mission.

A graduate of Corning Community College, where she earned an associate degree in mathematics in 1976, and Syracuse University, where she graduated with a Bachelor of Arts degree in mathematics and economics in 1978, Collins was commissioned as an officer in the USAF through Syracuse's Air Force Reserve Officer Training Corps program. She was one of four women chosen for Undergraduate Pilot Training at Vance Air Force Base, Oklahoma. After earning her pilot wings, she stayed on at Vance for three years as a T-38 Talon instructor pilot before transitioning to the C-141 Starlifter at Travis Air Force Base, California. During the U.S. invasion of Grenada in October 1983, her aircraft flew troops of the 82nd Airborne Division from (then) Pope Air Force Base in North Carolina to Grenada, and took thirty-six medical students back. From 1986 to 1989, she was an assistant professor in mathematics and a T-41 instructor pilot at the U.S. Air Force Academy in Colorado. She earned a Master of Science degree in operations research from Stanford University in 1986, and a Master of Arts degree in space systems management from Webster University in 1989. That year, she became the second woman pilot to attend the USAF Test Pilot School, graduating with class 89B.

In 1990, Collins was selected to be a pilot astronaut with NASA Astronaut Group 13. She flew the Space Shuttle as the pilot of the 1995 STS-63 mission, which involved a space rendezvous between Space Shuttle Discovery and the Russian space station Mir. She was also the pilot for STS-84 in 1997. She became the first woman to command a US spacecraft with STS-93, which launched in July 1999 and deployed the Chandra X-Ray Observatory. In 2005 she commanded STS-114, NASA's "return to flight" mission after the Space Shuttle Columbia disaster, to test safety improvements, and resupply the International Space Station (ISS). During this mission she became the first astronaut to fly the Space Shuttle orbiter through a complete 360-degree pitch maneuver so astronauts aboard the ISS could take photographs of its belly to ensure there was no threat from debris-related damage during re-entry. She retired from the USAF in January 2005 with the rank of colonel, and from NASA in May 2006.

== Early life ==
Eileen Marie Collins was born in Elmira, New York, on 19 November 1956. Her parents were James Edward Collins and his wife Rose Marie née O'Hara. Her father's ancestors came to the United States from County Cork in Ireland in the mid-1800s, settling in Pennsylvania and Elmira, New York. She had three siblings: an older brother, a younger sister, and a younger brother. Her father served in the US Navy in the Pacific Theater during World War II. After the war he managed the family bar, and then became a surveyor. Her parents separated when she was young, and her mother took a job as a stenographer at the Elmira Correctional Facility. As a child, Collins was shy and needed speech therapy for her stutter. She joined the Girl Scouts. She expressed an early interest in becoming a pilot, subscribing to Air Force Magazine and reading books about World War II-era military aviators such as Fate Is the Hunter and God Is My Co-Pilot.

Collins attended St. Patrick's School in Elmira up to the eighth grade and then Notre Dame High School, a Catholic high school, but was unhappy there. The family home was badly damaged by flooding caused by Hurricane Agnes in June 1972, and with finances tight, she was able to convince her mother to allow her to transfer to Elmira Free Academy, a public high school. After graduating from Elmira Free Academy in 1974, Collins considered enlisting in the US Air Force, but her father was adamantly opposed. Instead, she attended Corning Community College, where she earned an associate degree in mathematics in 1976. She then entered Syracuse University, which she chose because it had an Air Force Reserve Officer Training Corps (AFROTC) program.

In 1975, the United States Air Force (USAF) changed its policy to allow women to train as pilots, although only for non-combat missions. The first ten women chosen for pilot training in September 1976 were all serving Air Force officers with four-year college degrees. They graduated in September 1977. Collins noted their names and followed their progress and subsequent careers with interest, hoping to soon follow in their footsteps.

Six weeks after graduating from Corning, Collins reported to (then) Rickenbacker Air Force Base, Ohio for her six-week AFROTC basic officer Field Training prior to commencing the AFROTC program at Syracuse that fall. Women had different fitness standards from men, but Collins was granted permission to do the morning run with the men, who had to run 12 furlongs (2.4 km) in less than 12 minutes. The training included classes on the history of the USAF and the theory of flight, a ride in a Fairchild C-123 Provider, and a flight in a Cessna T-37 Tweet with an instructor. She took flying lessons in a Cessna 150 at Elmira Corning Regional Airport, eventually flying solo, but did not have time to complete all the requirements for a private pilot license.

In January 1978, Collins received orders to report to Offutt Air Force Base upon graduation from Syracuse, to become a computer systems engineer. Before this could occur, the Syracuse AFROTC commander, Colonel Vernon Hagen, informed her that the USAF was now accepting up to ten women from AFROTC programs for pilot training; the first ten women graduated on 2 September 1977. He offered to put her name forward. Collins eagerly accepted the offer, but a physical examination at Hancock Field Air National Guard Base revealed that although she had 20/20 visual acuity in her right eye, she had only 20/25 in the left, leading to her being rejected. Hagen told her to rest her eyes, and ordered a re-test, which she passed. She graduated later that year with a Bachelor of Arts in mathematics and economics.

== Air Force career ==
Upon graduation from Syracuse, Collins was commissioned as a second lieutenant in the USAF. She received orders to report to Lackland Air Force Base in Texas for the Flight Screening Program (FSP) In August 1978. She was one of four women in the class; there were ten men. The purpose of the FSP was to screen out unsuitable pilots before sending them to the more expensive Undergraduate Pilot Training (UPT) program. Collins was almost eliminated on medical grounds due to her left eye and a suspected heart murmur, but was cleared to fly. Training flights were conducted from nearby Hondo Municipal Airport in Cessna T-41 Mescalero aircraft.

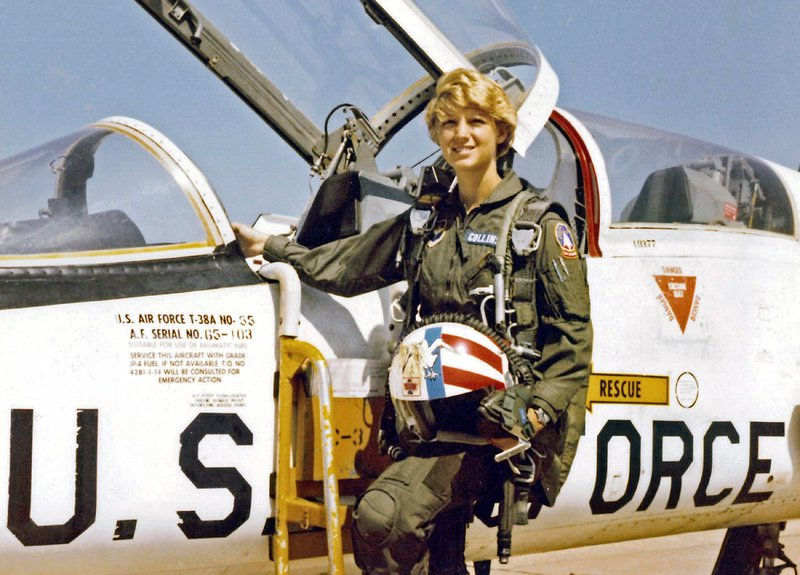
Collins with her T-38 when she graduated from flight school at Vance Air Force Base in Oklahoma in August 1979

For her UPT, Collins requested that she be assigned to Williams Air Force Base in Arizona, where the first ten women had trained, but the USAF personnel office decided to send her to Vance Air Force Base in Enid, Oklahoma. There were three other women in her class, 79–08. She decorated her helmet with the logo E = mc^{2}, an allusion to both her initials and Albert Einstein's mass–energy equivalence equation. Flight training was conducted in the T-37 Tweet. On 24 November 1978, she became the first member of her class to fly solo.

The second phase of instruction began in March 1979 in the Northrop T-38 Talon, a jet trainer. She received her pilot wings at the conclusion of this training, and was selected to become a flight instructor. There remained some training before she could join an operational unit. First, there was a week of Survival, Evasion, Resistance, and Escape training. The top-ranking members of the class went on to fly single-pilot aircraft, while the others became co-pilots. Most single-pilot aircraft were combat aircraft, which woman could not yet fly, so she stayed on at Vance as a T-38 Talon instructor pilot. This involved four weeks of pilot instructor training, which was conducted at Randolph Air Force Base in San Antonio, Texas. She was the first woman to become a T-38 instructor pilot, and the only woman flight instructor at Vance between September 1979 and December 1982.

Now a captain, Collins set her sights on becoming an astronaut. To achieve this goal, she aimed to graduate from the USAF Test Pilot School. Entry required at least one year as an aircraft commander in an operational aircraft and over one thousand hours flying time. She had already accumulated over a thousand hours flying as an instructor at Vance, but the USAF does not consider a trainer an operational aircraft, unlike a fighter, bomber, reconnaissance, transport, or refueling aircraft. Collins requested an assignment flying the Convair F-106 Delta Dart, McDonnell Douglas F-4 Phantom II, or Fairchild Republic A-10 Thunderbolt II, but women were still not permitted to fly combat aircraft, so she was assigned to Travis Air Force Base in California, to fly the Lockheed C-141 Starlifter, a transport aircraft that had been her 21st choice, as a co-pilot. She flew long-range missions such as the "Double Diego" run to Diego Garcia via Hickam Air Force Base in Hawaii, Andersen Air Force Base on Guam, and Clark Air Base in the Philippines. The aircraft then flew to Clark and Diego Garcia again, before heading homeward via Singapore, Kadena Air Base on Okinawa, Yokota Air Base in Japan and Elmendorf Air Force Base in Alaska. She also flew the "coral run" to Kwajalein Atoll, Wake Island, Johnston Atoll, and Midway Atoll, and to European destinations in Germany, Spain, Italy, Turkey, and the United Kingdom in support of the annual Reforger exercises.

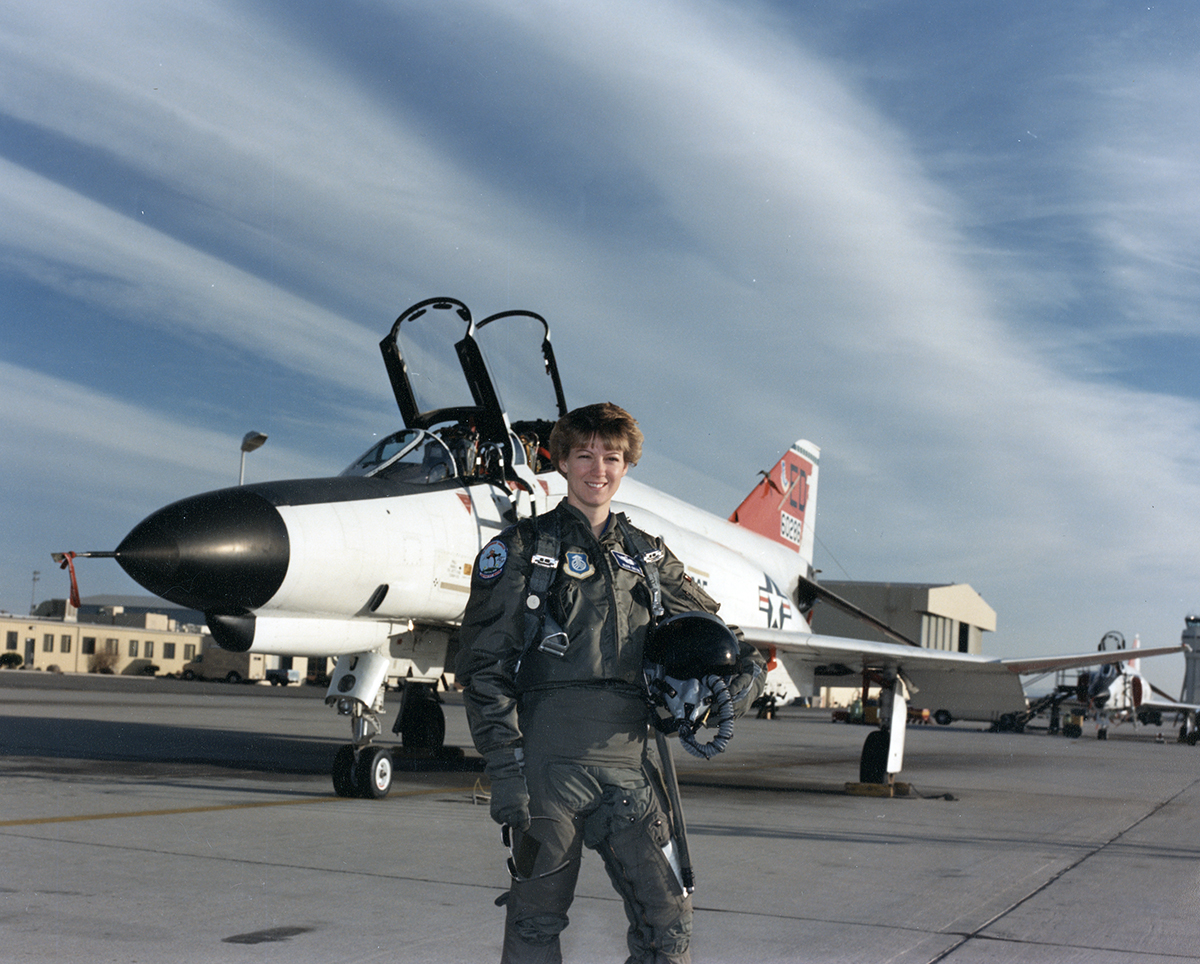
Collins with an F-4 Phantom II at Edwards Air Force Base on graduation from the USAF Test Pilot School in June 1990

During the invasion of Grenada in October 1983, her aircraft flew troops of the 82nd Airborne Division from (then) Pope Air Force Base in North Carolina to Grenada, and took thirty-six medical students back. Although women were not supposed to fly in combat, the USAF gave her combat pay for the mission, and awarded her the Armed Forces Expeditionary Medal. After nine months as a co-pilot, she was upgraded to first pilot. After attending aircraft commander school at Altus Air Force Base in Oklahoma, and aerial refueling training, she was upgraded to aircraft commander in June 1984.

From August 1986 to June 1989, Collins was assigned to the United States Air Force Academy in Colorado, where she was an assistant professor in mathematics, teaching courses on calculus and linear algebra, and a T-41 instructor pilot. Through the Air Force Institute of Technology, she earned a Master of Science in operations research from Stanford University in 1986, and a Master of Arts in space systems management from Webster University in 1989. She had begun dating a fellow C-141 pilot, James P. (Pat) Youngs, in August 1983. Youngs was also posted to the Air Force Academy, as a golf instructor. They were married on 1 August 1987. Youngs eventually left the USAF to fly as a commercial pilot for Delta Air Lines, thereby giving himself the flexibility to follow Collins as her career progressed.

Earning an advanced degree improved her chances of being selected for the USAF Test Pilot School at Edwards Air Force Base in California, but USAF rules required officers to pay back their tuition by serving with the duty assignment that provided the funding. This meant that she was supposed to remain at the Air Force Academy for three years. She hoped that this rule would be waived, but her first two applications for the USAF Test Pilot School were rejected on these grounds. When she applied for a third time in 1989, she had been in the USAF for longer than the ten-year maximum allowed before entering the USAF Test Pilot School, but this time a waiver was granted. In the meantime, Captain Jacquelyn Susan "Jackie" Parker became the first woman to graduate from the USAF Test Pilot School in 1988.

Collins became the second woman pilot to attend when she joined Class 89B in June 1989. She was also the most senior member of the class, as she was the only one with the rank of major, which made her the class leader. At Edwards she flew several types of aircraft, including the Lockheed TR-1, P-3 Orion, and C-130 Hercules, the de Havilland Canada UV-18 Twin Otter, the Boeing KC-135 Stratotanker, Cessna A-37 Dragonfly, Learjet 24, Beechcraft King Air, General Dynamics F-16 Fighting Falcon, and F-111, McDonnell Douglas F-4 Phantom II, Vought A-7 Corsair II, and the Goodyear Blimp. She graduated in June 1990.

== Astronaut career ==
=== Selection and training ===
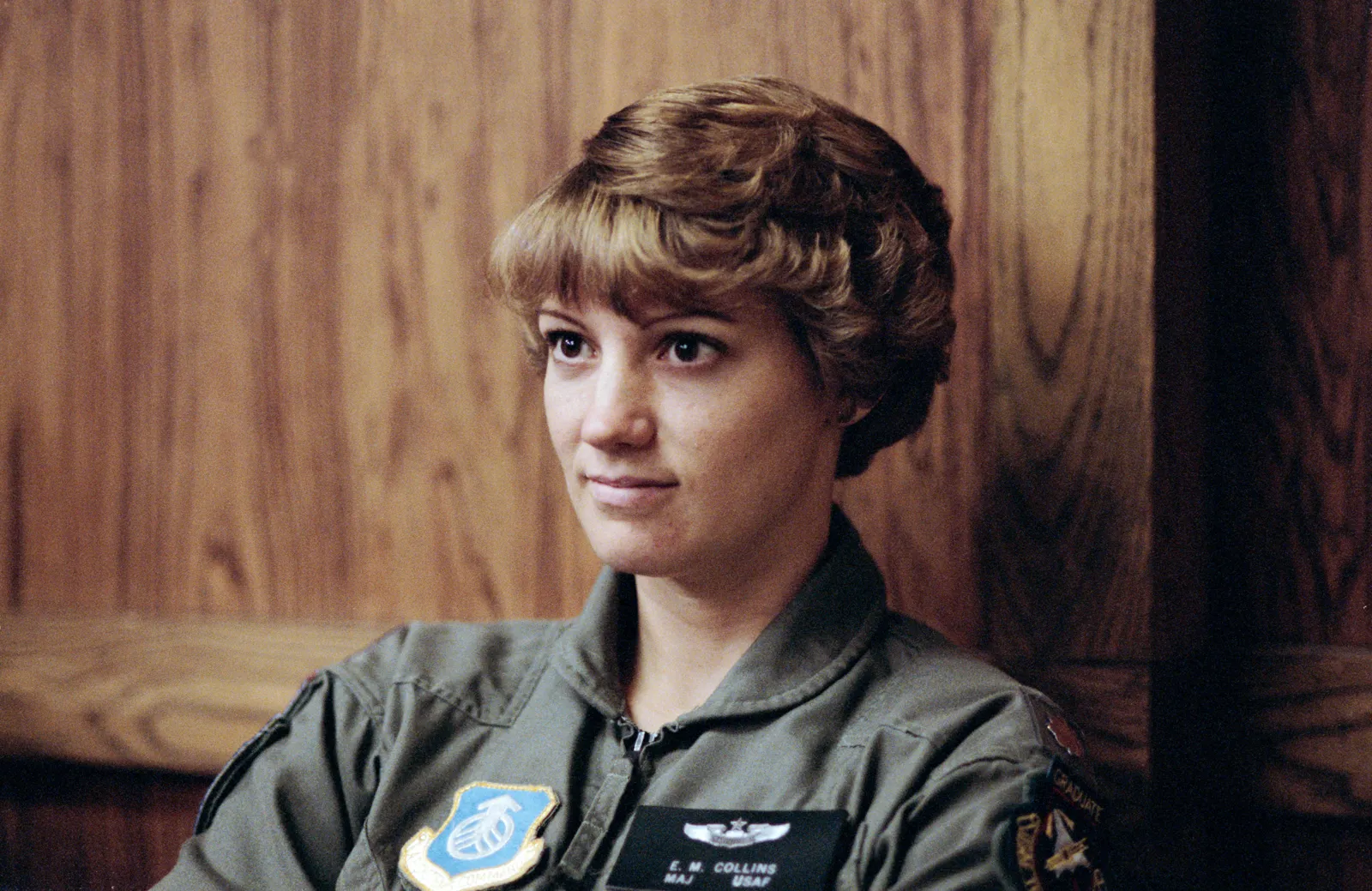
Collins attending a survival training course at Vance Air Force Base, Oklahoma

On 17 April 1989, the National Air and Space Administration (NASA) announced that it was selecting another class of astronauts. Collins's application was one of nearly 2,500 received by the 30 June 1989 deadline, of which 1,945 met the minimum requirements for pilots or mission specialists. Because she had not yet graduated from the USAF Test Pilot School, the USAF submitted her application as one for a mission specialist. NASA convened a selection board chaired by the Director of Flight Crew Operations, Don Puddy, which also included Carolyn Huntoon, the Director of Life Sciences; Joseph Atkinson, the Chief of Equal Opportunity Programs; and astronauts John Young, Charles Bolden, Hoot Gibson, Rhea Seddon, Jerry Ross, and Mary Cleave.

In September 1989, Collins received a call from Duane Ross, the selection board's administrative officer, inviting her to come to the Johnson Space Center (JSC) with the second of five groups of hopefuls for a week of interviews, examinations, medical evaluations, and orientation, commencing on 2 October 1989. Once again, her eyesight proved a problem; she failed the depth perception test, but the doctor allowed her to take an alternative test, which she passed. On 16 January 1990, she saw a note on the message board asking her to call Duane Ross. When she called she was put through to John Young, who informed her that she had been selected. When he asked if she had any questions, she asked if she was to be a pilot or a mission specialist. Young laughed and told her: "Pilot! Yes, pilot. You will be the first woman to pilot the Space Shuttle!"

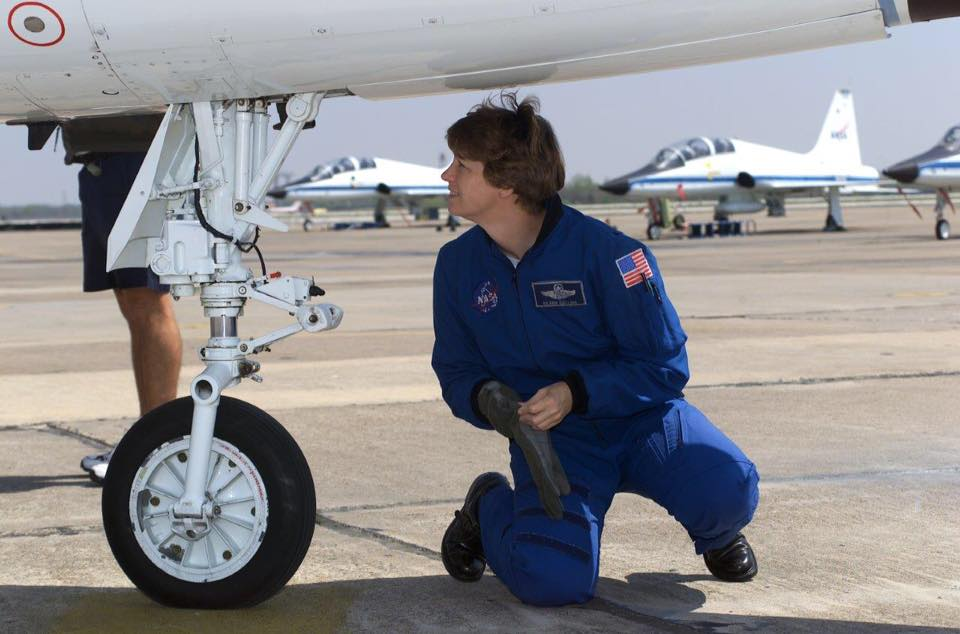
Collins with a NASA T-38 trainer jet at Ellington Field near the Johnson Space Center in Houston

Collins's selection as one of the twenty-three astronaut candidates (ASCANs) in NASA Astronaut Group 13 was publicly announced on 17 January 1990. The group called themselves the "Hairballs". She reported for duty at JSC on 16 July 1990, after graduating from the USAF Test Pilot School. She knew one other member of the group well: Susan Helms had been a fellow assistant professor at the Air Force Academy and graduate student at Stanford. Pilot ASCANs honed their skills flying the T-38, an aircraft with which Collins was already familiar. They attended classes on the Space Shuttle and its systems, and trained in a low-fidelity simulator. Land survival training was conducted at Fairchild Air Force Base in Washington, water survival training at Naval Air Station Pensacola in Florida, and parachute training at Vance Air Force Base. Although their training was intended to take a year, the ASCANs were moved on to operational roles after nine months. Collins was assigned to orbiter systems, with particular responsibility for the auxiliary power units.

After nine months in this assignment, Collins was sent to the Kennedy Space Center (KSC) in Florida as an astronaut support person (ASP), also known as a Cape Crusader. This was another routine assignment that astronauts did to familiarize them with the Space Shuttle's systems and procedures. ASPs handled the checkout of the systems in the hangar and on the launch pad. As members of the KSC closeout crew, they strapped the astronauts into their seats before takeoff, and helped them out again after landing. Collins spent sixteen months as an ASP, assisting with ten Space Shuttle missions between February 1992 and June 1993. After so long away from JSC, her skills in the simulator had become rusty, so the Chief of the Astronaut Office, Hoot Gibson, returned her to JSC for duty as a capsule communicator (CAPCOM).

=== STS-63 ===
Collins first flew the Space Shuttle as pilot in 1995 aboard STS-63. This was the first time a woman had piloted the Space Shuttle. Delays in the flight schedule meant that she was the second-last member of her class to fly in space. Two more women pilots joined the Astronaut Corps in 1995 with NASA Astronaut Group 15: Pamela Melroy and Susan Still. They would be the only other women to pilot the Space Shuttle in its thirty-year history.

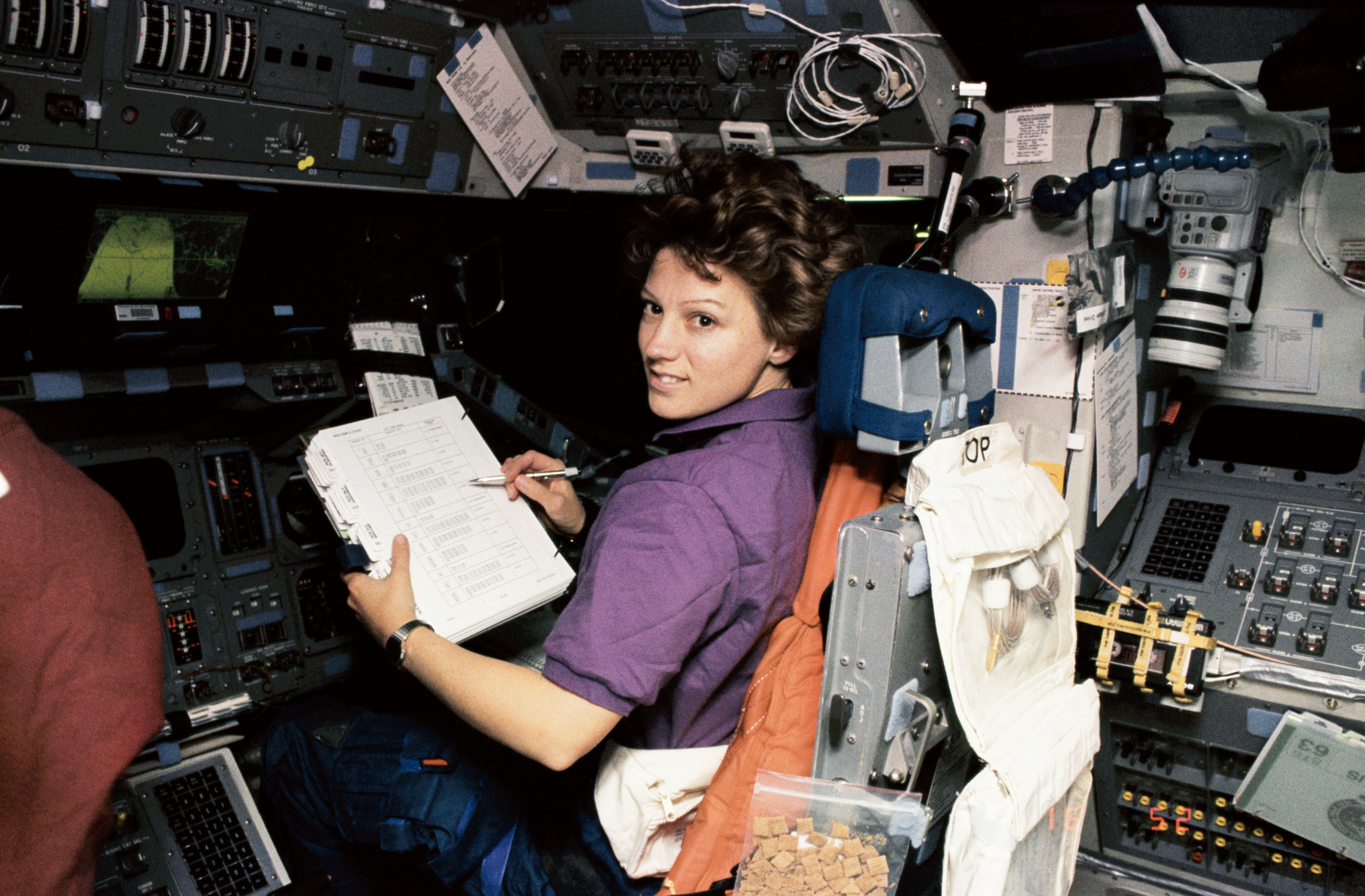
Collins at the pilot's station onboard Space Shuttle Discovery on flight day one of the STS-63 mission during a "hotfiring" procedure prior to rendezvous with the Russian Mir Space Station

The STS-63 mission included a space rendezvous between the Space Shuttle Discovery and the Russian space station Mir. This was the first time a Space Shuttle made an approach and flyaround of Mir, although it did not dock. The crew included a cosmonaut, Vladimir Georgiyevich Titov, who had lived on Mir for a year. He became the second cosmonaut to fly on the Space Shuttle.

In preparation for the mission, Collins flew over 500 approaches and landings in the Shuttle Training Aircraft (STA), a NASA training vehicle that duplicated the orbiter's approach profile and handling qualities. The crew paid a visit to Russia and visited Star City and aircraft and spacecraft museums in the Moscow area, and sat in the cockpit of the Buran spacecraft, the Russian equivalent of the Space Shuttle. On Collins's invitation, seven of the surviving members of the Mercury 13 attended the launch on 3 February 1995.

A series of thruster burns brought Discovery into line with Mir. The mission plan called for an approach to no less than 10 meters (11 yd) of Mir, followed by a flyaround. This was delayed by problems with three of the orbiter's 44 Reaction Control System (RCS) thrusters, which sprang leaks. Some thrusters could be shut off, but one thruster, R1U, was required for rendezvous, and could not. Eventually all its contents leaked into space and it was safe to approach Mir.

As well as rendezvousing with Mir, Discovery carried the Spacehab module and the SPARTAN-204 astronomy satellite. Collins had never experienced airsickness, but felt nauseous. This was remedied by a Phenergan shot, but she only ate Chex on the first three days, taking dinner for the first time on the fourth. Her responsibilities included running the Fluids Generic Bioprocessing Apparatus-1 (FGBA-1), a Coca-Cola dispensing machine. Astronauts rated control samples before and after flight. Discovery landed back at KSC on 11 February 1995, after 8 days, 6 hours, and 28 minutes in flight.

Soon after returning from space, Collins became pregnant. Her first child, Bridget, was born nine months later.

=== STS-84 ===
In August 1995, Collins was assigned to her second mission, STS-84. This mission would dock with Mir, leave astronaut Michael Foale behind for a four-month stay, and return with astronaut Jerry Linenger at the conclusion of his stay on Mir. Foale had been with Collins on the STS-63 mission. This time the cosmonaut on the mission would be Yelena Kondakova, who had spent 169 days on Mir between October 1994 to March 1995 as part of the Mir EO-17 mission. Collins had glimpsed her during the STS-63 mission. The mission commander, Charles Precourt, spoke Russian fluently. The crew also included a French ESA astronaut, Jean-François Clervoy.

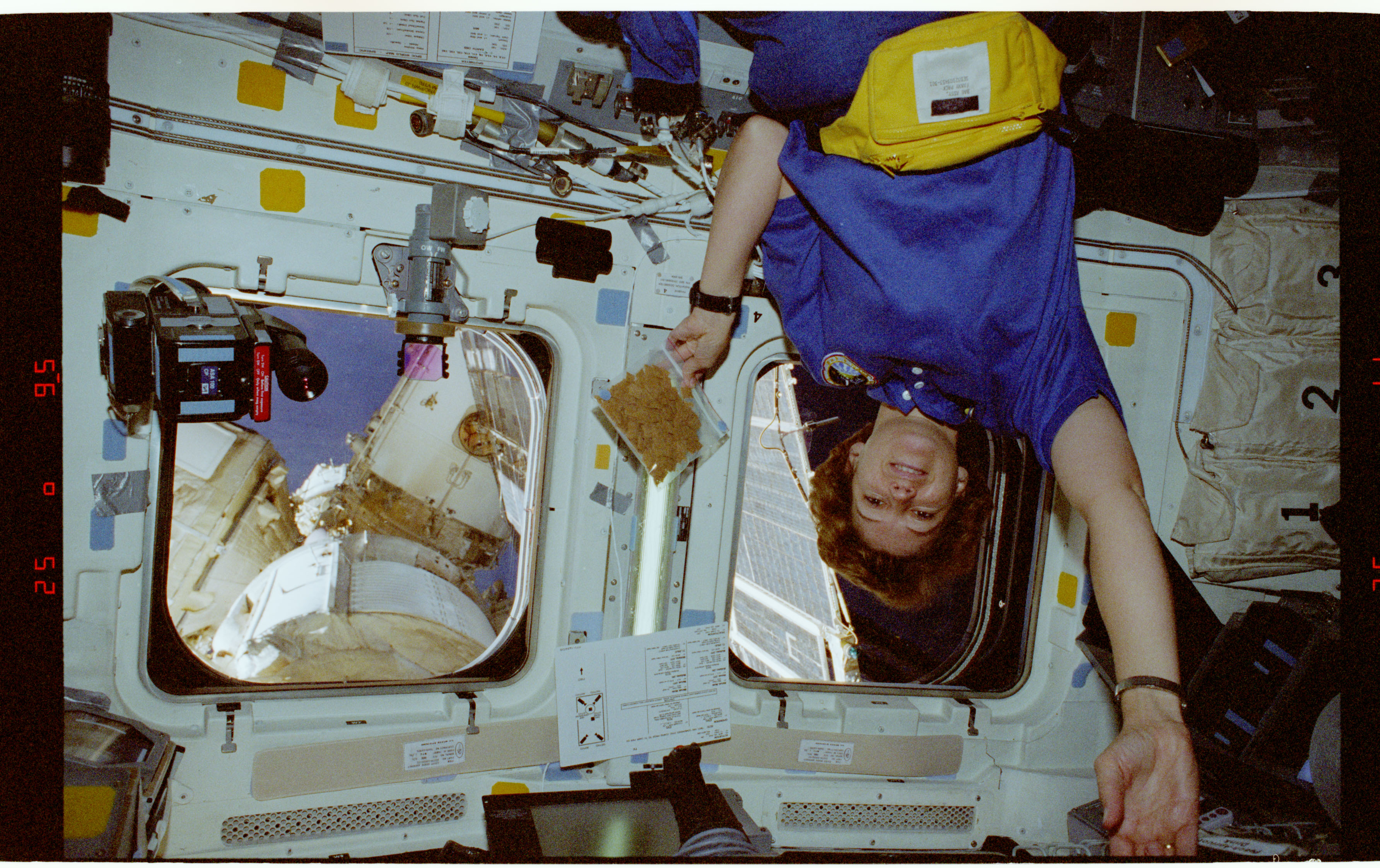
In front of the overhead flight deck windows where the Mir Space Station is visible during the STS-84 mission

The STS-84 mission used the Space Shuttle Atlantis, which had a reputation as the least troublesome orbiter, and for this mission carried two Spacehab modules instead of just one. In preparation for the mission, Collins completed one hundred hours of Russian language classroom training, but she usually relied on Precourt translating for her. The crew traveled to Star City to study Mir's systems and had dinner at the home of Kondakova and her husband, cosmonaut Valeri Ryumin, now the president of Energia, the Russian space agency.

Atlantis lifted off from KSC on 15 May 1997. For Collins, it was the first and only time a launch had occurred without delays. Nor were there any leaking thrusters; Atlantis docked with Mir without incident the next day. This time, Collins felt no nausea. Crew members were exchanged, and 7,300 pounds (3,300 kg) of equipment, spare parts, experiments, and supplies were transferred to Mir, of which 1,000 pounds (450 kg) was water.

Collins spent most of the time filling bags with drinking water. She also carried out a photographic survey of the exterior of Mir through portholes on Mir and the overhead windows on Atlantis's flight deck. The Mir EO-23 mission commander, Vasily Tsibliyev produced a small bottle of Courvoisier cognac, and everyone had a couple of sips. Alcohol consumption was banned on the Space Shuttle, but not on Mir. The rest of the mission was taken up conducting experiments. Collins photographed Comet Hale–Bopp, the brightest comet seen in the sky for many years. Atlantis returned to KSC on 24 May after a flight lasting 9 days, 23 hours, and 20 minutes.

=== STS-93 ===
The usual practice at this time was for a pilot astronaut to fly two missions as a pilot and then go on to command a mission. Collins had heard of the Advanced X-ray Astrophysics Facility (AXAF) and indicated to the Chief of the Astronaut Office, Bob Cabana, that she was interested in flying the mission to deploy it. A few months later, JSC deputy director Jim Wetherbee and director George Abbey informed her that she was to be assigned to the mission, which was designated STS-93. This would be the first time that a woman commanded a Space Shuttle mission, so the official announcement of her assignment was made by the first lady, Hillary Clinton, in the Roosevelt Room of the White House on 5 March 1998.

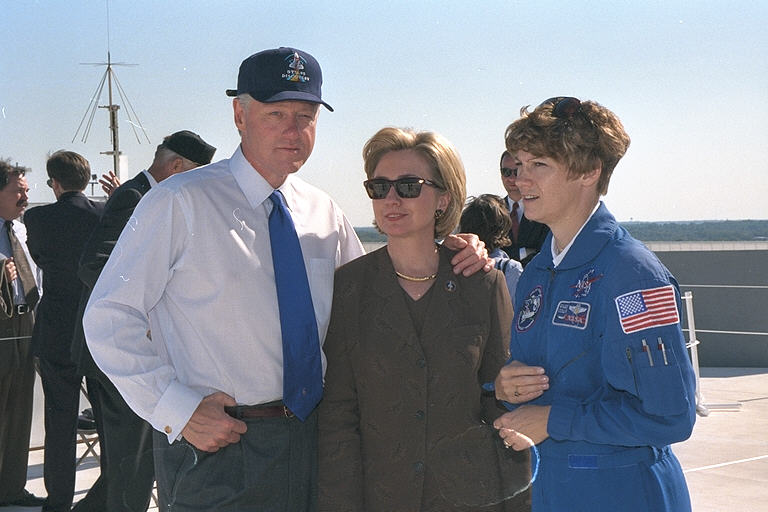
Collins with President Bill Clinton and First Lady Hillary Clinton on 29 October 1998

Jeffrey Ashby, a rookie astronaut, was assigned as Collins's pilot. To deploy the AXAF, she had NASA mission specialist astronaut Cady Coleman and French CNES astronaut Michel Tognini. Originally, Winston E. Scott was to be the second mission specialist, but NASA headquarters wanted an astronomer with experience with the inertial upper stage (IUS) that would deploy the AXAF. Steven Hawley was the only available astronaut who met both these requirements. Hawley was a very senior astronaut who had been selected with NASA Astronaut Group 8 in 1978, and had helped deploy the Hubble Space Telescope in 1990 and service it in 1997. Collins was apprehensive that Hawley would attempt to command the mission. Her fears proved groundless; Hawley offered wisdom and advice but made no attempt to interfere with Collins's command of the mission.

The STS-93 mission was not routine. The Space Shuttle Columbia had to be used because its airlock was inside the crew compartment instead of the payload bay. This meant that it was the only orbiter that could accommodate the AXAF and the IUS. Initially scheduled for January 1999, the launch date was delayed due to an investigation of a failed USAF Titan IV launch using the IUS and problems that were discovered during testing of the AXAF (now named the Chandra X-ray Observatory). This pushed the launch date back to April and then to July, when Columbia was scheduled for fifteen months' maintenance in Palmdale, California.

Because the AXAF weighed 30,852 pounds (13,994 kg) and the IUS weighed 12,930 pounds (5,860 kg), this was the heaviest payload ever launched by the Space Shuttle. To save weight, the crew was reduced to five members, and consumables to those needed for a five-day mission. This made it the shortest scheduled mission since 1990. Two of the five pairs of tanks holding hydrogen and oxygen for the fuel cells were removed, as was the robotic arm, so any problems had to be resolved in the payload bay, as the Chandra could not be retrieved. The large mass shifted Columbia's center of gravity, rendering a landing after an emergency abort extremely hazardous.

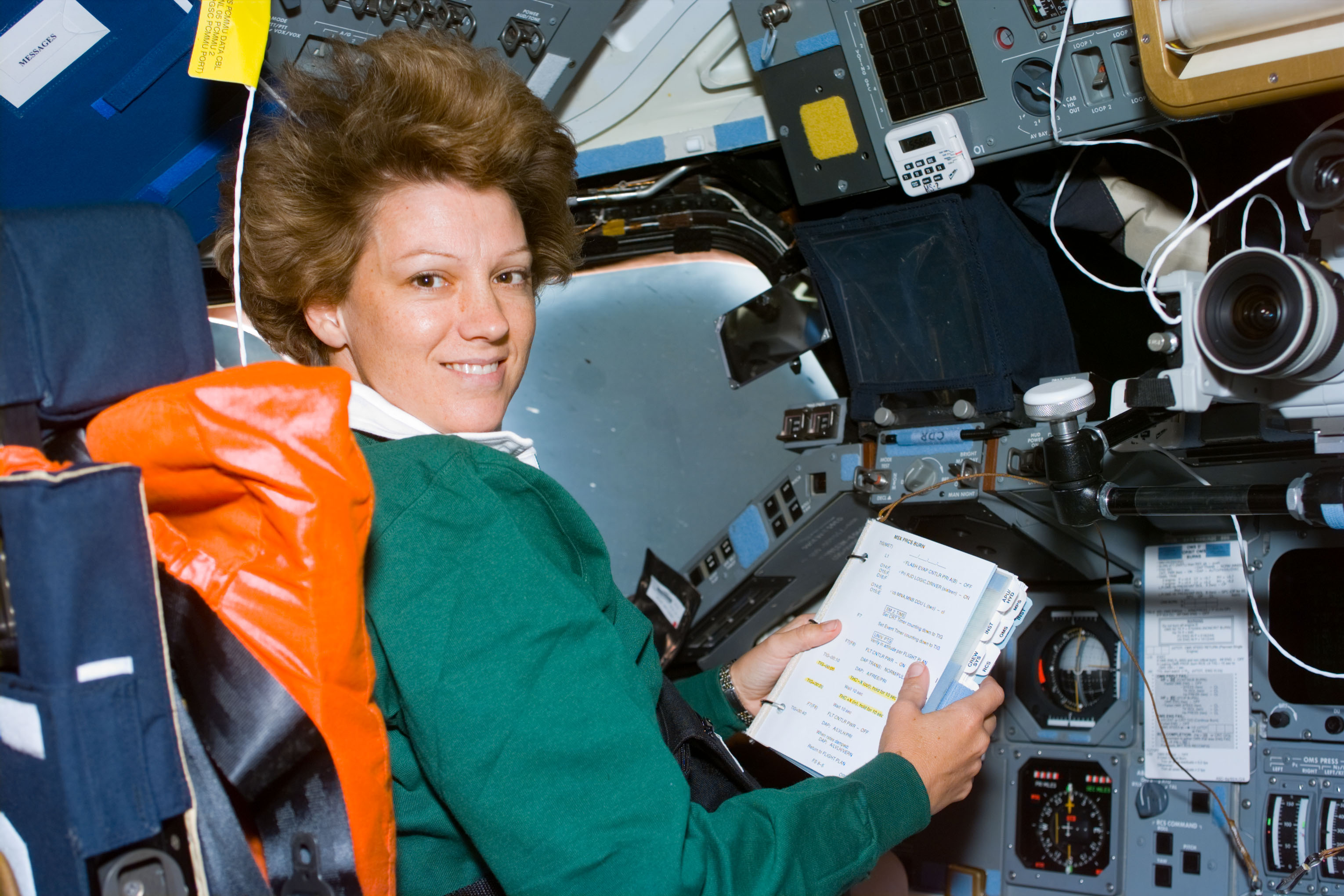
Collins at the commander's station on Space Shuttle Columbia on the first day of the STS-93 mission

The launch day of 20 July 1999, coincided with the thirtieth anniversary of the Apollo 11 Moon landing mission, so former astronauts Neil Armstrong, Buzz Aldrin, and Michael Collins were at KSC to watch the launch. Observers also included Hillary Clinton and the United States women's national soccer team, who had recently won the 1999 FIFA Women's World Cup. The launch countdown proceeded smoothly until Columbia's hazardous gas detection system highlighted an unacceptably high hydrogen concentration in the aft engine compartment, and the countdown was halted less than half a second before the Space Shuttle main engines (SSMEs) were to have started. Had they been started, they would have had to be replaced, which would have taken a month, pushing it into the scheduled maintenance window.

There was no fuel leak; the sensor was faulty. The launch was rescheduled for two days later. It then had to be postponed a further day due to bad weather. On the third launch attempt, there was a seven-minute delay due to a communications problem, but Columbia lifted off at last on 23 July. One of the main engine controllers failed during takeoff, and one of the main engines cut out prematurely. As a result, the orbit reached was 7 miles (11 km) lower than intended but the situation could have been much worse; the engine problem was caused by a pin that had come loose and struck the nozzle, rupturing three liquid hydrogen coolant tubes. Had the controller not been faulty, it might have pumped more liquid oxygen and caused the engine to explode. After the flight, faults were found not just in Columbia, but in Discovery and Endeavour as well, and the whole Space Shuttle fleet was grounded until December.

Columbia eventually reached the proper orbit and the Chandra X-ray Observatory was successfully deployed. For the remainder of the mission, the crew used the Southwest Ultraviolet Imaging System (SWUIS) to take ultraviolet images of the Earth, the Moon, Mercury, Venus, and Jupiter. Collins used the Shuttle Amateur Radio Experiment (SAREX) to talk to children on amateur radio stations with her call sign KD5EDS. On 27 July, Collins brought Columbia in for a night landing, the twelfth of the Space Shuttle program. The flight had lasted 4 days, 22 hours, and 50 minutes. She was awarded the Distinguished Flying Cross for this mission.

After a flight astronauts usually carried out a publicity tour. Collins appeared with Coleman on The Tonight Show with Jay Leno on 16 August. She opened the New York Stock Exchange on 7 January 2000, and appeared on the Oprah Winfrey show on 25 April 2000. She had a miscarriage in November 1999, but a son, Luke, was born in November 2000.

=== STS-114 ===
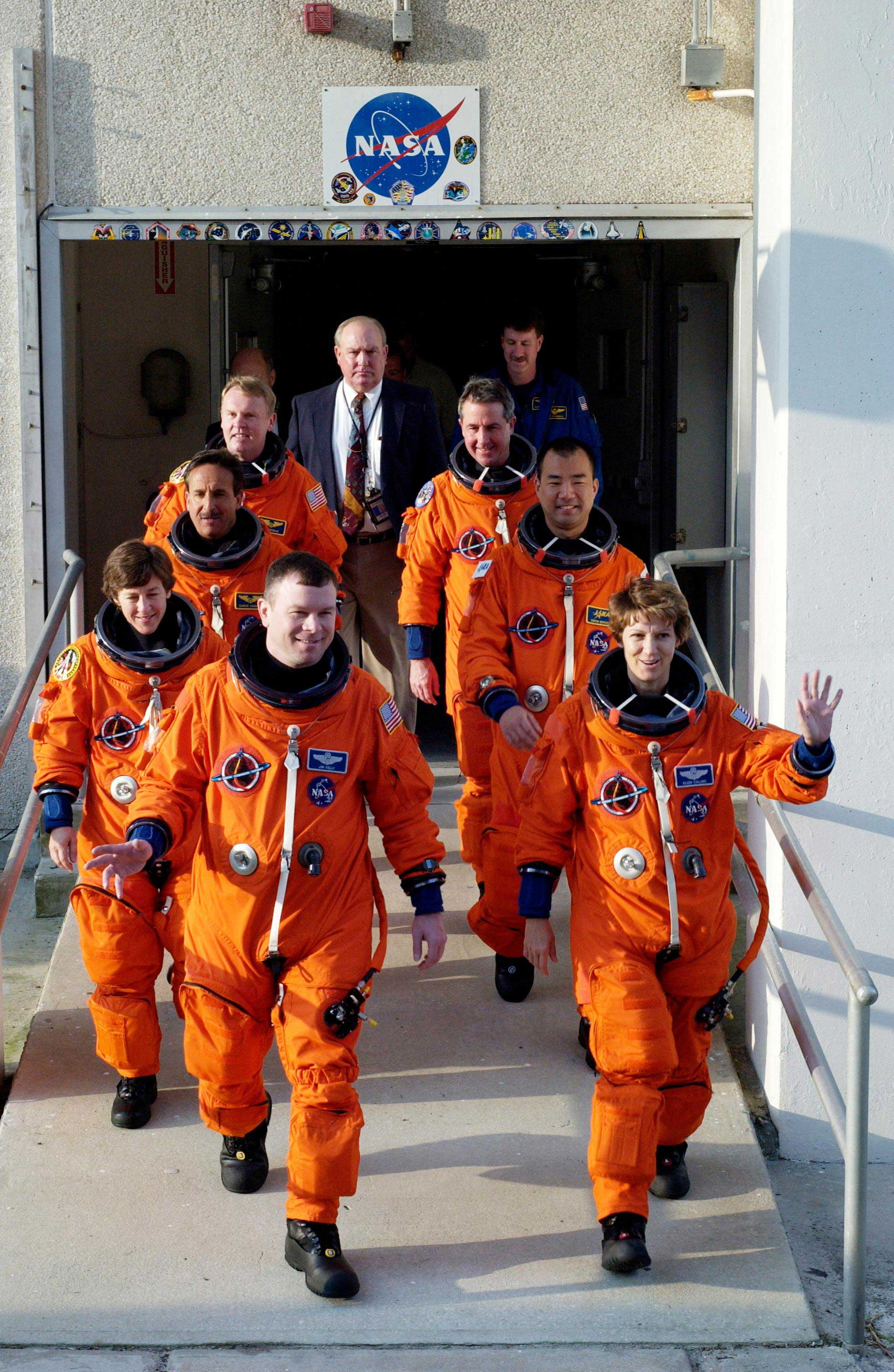
Collins with the STS-114 crew on their way to launch pad

After the STS-84 mission, Collins had become the head of the Vehicle Systems Branch of the Astronaut Office, which she had renamed the Spacecraft Systems Branch, as the scope of its work now included the International Space Station (ISS) as well as the Space Shuttle. She relinquished this position on being assigned to command STS-93. After returning from that mission, she became the chief information officer at the Astronaut Office. In that role she automated the scheduling system, an initiative of the new Chief of the Astronaut Office, Charles Precourt. She then became the chief of the Space Shuttle Branch, remaining in this role until November 2000, when she left on maternity leave. On returning to work in January 2001, she became the chief of the Safety Branch, replacing Rick Husband, who left to command the STS-107 mission. In turn, Collins handed over the position to Dom Gorie when she was assigned to command STS-114 in late 2001.

The STS-114 mission involved docking Atlantis with the ISS to transfer crewmen and supplies. Jim Kelly was assigned as the mission's pilot and Stephen Robinson and Japanese JAXA astronaut Soichi Noguchi were assigned as mission specialists. The mission would take Expedition 7 to the ISS and bring Expedition 6 back. Some 1,100 cubic feet (31 m^{3}) of supplies would be transferred to the ISS from the Multi-Purpose Logistics Module, which would then be filled with experiments, equipment that was no longer required, and garbage to be returned to Earth. Three spacewalks were scheduled, to install an external stowage platform on the ISS Quest Joint Airlock and to replace a gyroscope that had failed. Collins was concerned about the proposed workload; she knew from her experience on STS-93 that a hectic schedule and pressure to get things done often resulted in mistakes.

Problems discovered with the propellant feed lines on Atlantis and then on Discovery in June 2002 led to the entire Space Shuttle fleet being grounded again until October, pushing the launch date back to 6 March 2003. The fleet was then grounded again after the Space Shuttle Columbia disaster in February 2003. STS-114 now became NASA's "return to flight" mission to test safety improvements in addition to resupplying the ISS. The crew remained the same, but instead of the ISS expedition crew members, STS-114 would take three additional mission specialists to handle the greater workload: Andy Thomas to coordinate the spacewalks and Wendy Lawrence to operate the robotic arm, which was equipped with specialized cameras so that the Space Shuttle could be surveyed for damage. STS-114 was already scheduled to be the next mission flown, but it is unlikely that it would have remained so if Collins and Kelly had not already flown a mission as commander and pilot respectively. Collins advocated for at least one rookie astronaut to be assigned to the flight, and Charles Camarda was added.

Rick Hauck, who had commanded the return to flight mission after the Space Shuttle Challenger disaster, advised her to visit the contractors where the Space Shuttle components were made. She visited the Rockwell International plant in Canoga Park, California, where the SSMEs were refurbished, the Thiokol factory in Brigham City, Utah, where the solid rocket boosters (SRBs) were made, and the Michoud Assembly Facility in New Orleans, Louisiana, where the Space Shuttle external tank was assembled. Asked if she felt afraid after the loss of Columbia, Collins replied: "I would have to say no. I want to fly again. I am very mentally ready to go fly again." Then pausing, noting that she wanted to be precise, she added "I am mentally ready to go fly again when the shuttle is cleared to fly."

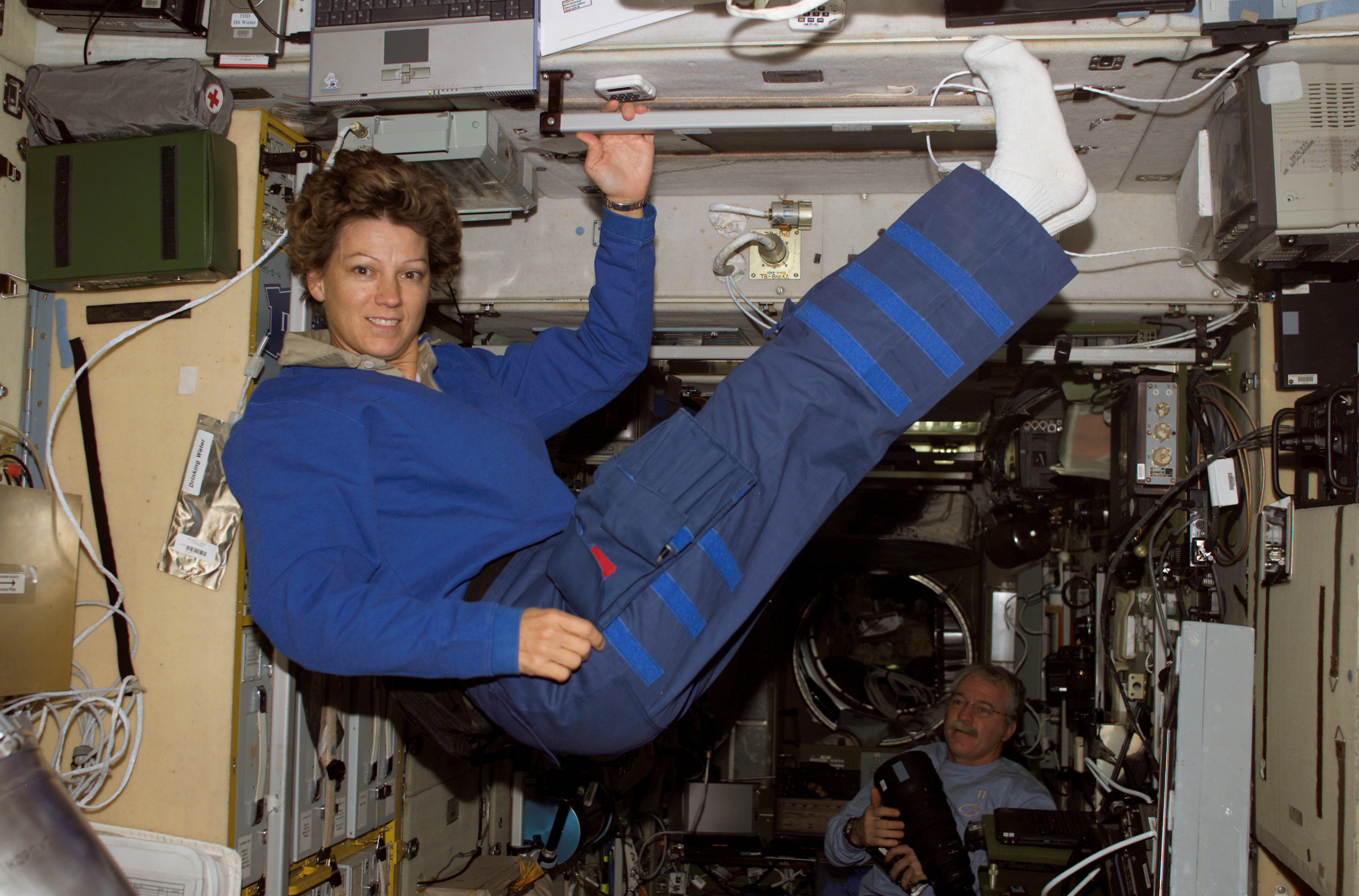
Collins floating in the Zvezda service module of the International Space Station while the Space Shuttle Discovery was docked

She expressed reservations about the studs that held the Space Shuttle in place on the launch pad. The bolts holding them were supposed to be ruptured by explosive charges on lift off, but not all had done so on every mission; nuts had failed to rupture on one in five missions. If too many failed to separate, the result could be catastrophic. A new detonator system was devised, but would not be available for STS-114. She also had concerns about the booster separation motors that separated the SRBs from the orbiter. These were redesigned for STS-114. Finally, she expressed concern about rudder/speed brake (RSB) actuators. An inspection of the RSB actuators on Discovery revealed problems; these were rectified by taking parts from Endeavour. Since it would take a month to inspect Atlantis, Discovery was substituted for Atlantis for the STS-114 mission.

Discovery was rolled out to the launch pad on 6 April 2005, but problems with the sensors in the external tank led to it being taken back to the Vehicle Assembly Building at KSC to swap the external tank. This pushed the launch date back to 13 July. Then the same problem recurred, causing another postponement. The mission was launched on 26 July 2005, after a flawless countdown. Although Discovery was not damaged, video of the launch revealed that the problem with debris striking the Space Shuttle had not been resolved. Ten pieces of foam had broken off the external tank during liftoff, including a 92-by-279-by-17-centimeter (36.3 in × 110 in × 6.7 in) piece that was the largest ever recorded. This was the problem that had doomed Columbia, and it had evidently not been fixed. Collins blamed herself for not pushing Michoud harder to effect changes.

The STS-114 mission continued, as Discovery was already in orbit, but the Space Shuttle fleet was grounded again. Collins became the first astronaut to fly an orbiter through a complete 360-degree pitch maneuver. This was necessary so the astronauts aboard the ISS could take photographs of Discovery's belly to ensure there was no threat from debris-related damage to the orbiter upon reentry. It was a difficult maneuver, but one that she had practised many times in the simulator. She then flew under the ISS and docked with it. The inspections revealed some concerns: gap fillers were protruding between some of the tiles, which could cause them to pop out during re-entry. The three spacewalks and the transfer of supplies were carried out without problems. On the third spacewalk, Robinson rode the robotic arm to the underside of Discovery and removed the two most prominent protruding gap fillers.

Discovery was supposed to land at KSC on 8 August but unfavorable weather led to a postponement until the next day, and the landing site was changed to Edwards Air Force Base. Discovery touched down after a mission lasting 13 days, 21 hours, and 33 minutes. This time, Collins was unhappy with her landing, feeling that it was slightly fast. She was relieved to find that the tires were in good shape. Although she had felt well in space on this mission, her feet hurt as the bones moved back into position back on the ground, and the pain took two weeks to subside.

== Later life ==
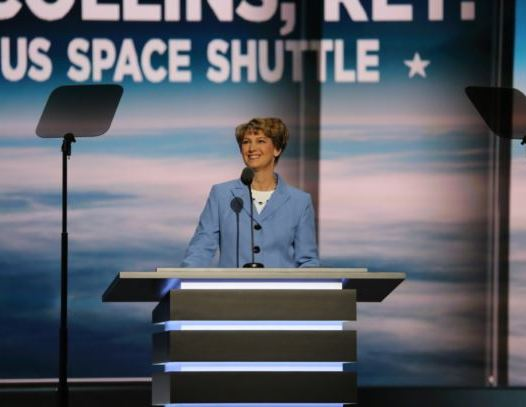
Collins speaking at the 2016 Republican National Convention

Collins retired from the U.S. Air Force in January 2005 with the rank of colonel. On 1 May 2006, NASA announced that she was leaving NASA to spend more time with her family and pursue other interests. She had flown 6,751 hours in thirty different types of aircraft, and logged over 872 hours in space flights.

After her retirement from the USAF and NASA, Collins served on the Board of Directors of USAA, a San Antonio banking and insurance company, from 2006 to 2021. She remained involved with NASA, as chair of the Space Operations Committee of the NASA Advisory Council from 2007 to 2011.

Collins also made occasional public appearances as an analyst covering Shuttle launches and landings for CNN. She was the commencement speaker at the 148th commencement of Syracuse University in May 2001. She addressed the 2016 Republican National Convention in Cleveland, Ohio, on 20 July 2016, leading to speculation that Donald Trump might appoint her NASA administrator.

In 2025, the documentary Spacewoman was released, documenting Collins' life and career, and was directed by Hannah Berryman based on Collins' published memoir.

== Awards and honors ==
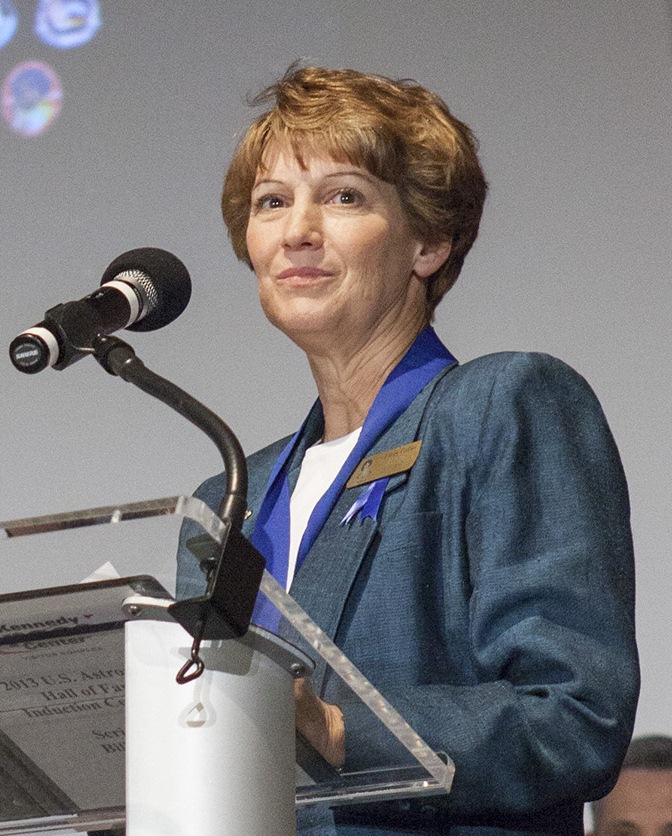
Collins speaks after being inducted into the United States Astronaut Hall of Fame in 2013

As well as USAF Command Pilot (Astronaut) wings, Collins's awards and decorations include the Legion of Merit, the Distinguished Flying Cross, the Defense Meritorious Service Medal, Meritorious Service Medal with an oak leaf cluster, the Air Force Commendation Medal with an oak leaf cluster, the NASA Outstanding Leadership Medal, NASA Exceptional Service Medal, and four NASA Space Flight Medals. She received the Golden Plate Award of the American Academy of Achievement in 2001, the Free Spirit Award, National Space Trophy, and Adler Planetarium Women in Space Science Award in 2006, the Space Foundation Douglas S. Morrow Public Outreach Award in 2007, the Harmon Trophy in 2020, and the Wright Brothers Memorial Trophy in 2022.

Collins was inducted into the National Women's Hall Of Fame in 1995, the National Aviation Hall of Fame in 2009, the United States Astronaut Hall of Fame on 19 April 2013, and the Texas Aviation Hall Of Fame at the Lone Star Flight Museum in Houston, Texas, on 6 May 2020. She was recognized by the Encyclopædia Britannica as one of 300 women who have changed the world.

An astronomical observatory—the Eileen Collins Observatory run by Corning Community College—is named in her honor, as is the main entrance boulevard to Syracuse Hancock International Airport. One of her graduate school alma maters, Webster University, awarded her an honorary Doctor of Science in 1996, and in 2021, she received Syracuse University's highest alumni honor, the George Arents Award. University College Dublin of the National University of Ireland also conferred an honorary Doctor of Science degree on her on 14 June 2006. She was awarded with Wright Brothers Memorial Trophy in 2022.

== Publications ==
- Collins, Eileen M.; Ward, Jonathan H. (2021). Through the Glass Ceiling to the Stars: The Story of the First American Woman to Command a Space Mission. New York: Arcade. ISBN 978-1-950994-05-2. OCLC 1281565457.
