= Eileen M. Collins Observatory =

Observatory in New York state, US

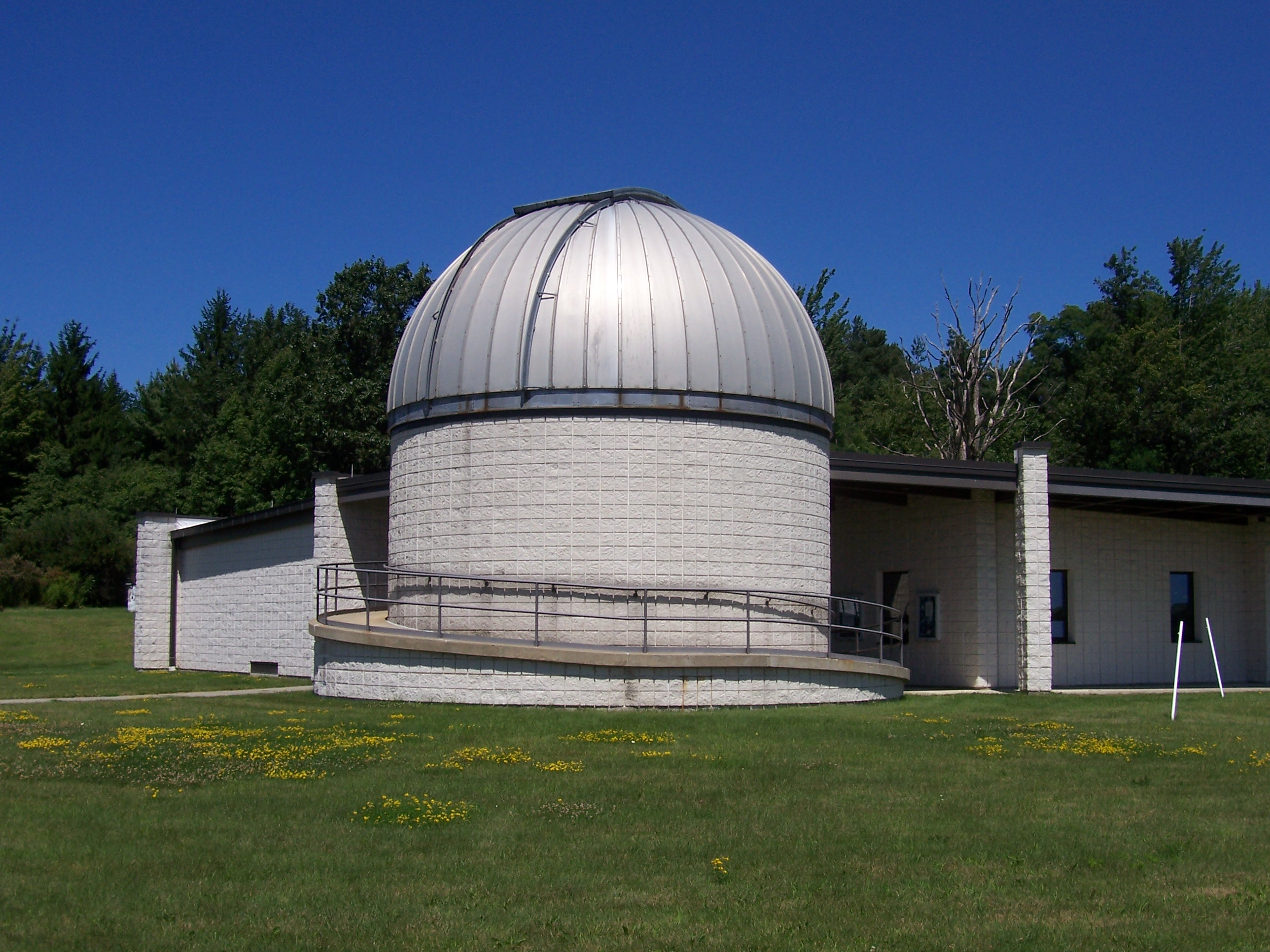
- Organization: Corning Community College
- Observatory code: 911
- Location: Corning, New York
- Coordinates: 42.11803°N 77.07768°W
- Altitude: 826 feet (252 m)
- Established: 2003
- Website: www.corning-cc.edu/visitors/observatory

Telescopes
- One-tenth scale model of the Hale Telescope: 20" reflecting telescope
- 16", 14", 12", 10", 8", 6", 4" reflecting telescopes
- 8" Schmidt–Cassegrain telescope
- Solar telescope

The Eileen M. Collins Observatory is a small astronomical observatory operated by Corning Community College in Corning, New York, United States. It is named for astronaut Eileen Collins. The observatory is primarily used to teach astronomy classes, but the college also provides monthly viewing sessions for the public.

The observatory is equipped with reflecting telescopes ranging from four inches to 20 inches in diameter. The largest telescope is a one-tenth scale model of the Hale Telescope at Mount Palomar. The smaller telescopes were assembled by the Elmira-Corning Astronomical Society. Additionally, the observatory maintains an eight-inch Schmidt–Cassegrain telescope and a solar telescope.

== See also ==
- List of astronomical observatories
