= Corning Community College =

Community college in Corning, New York, U.S.

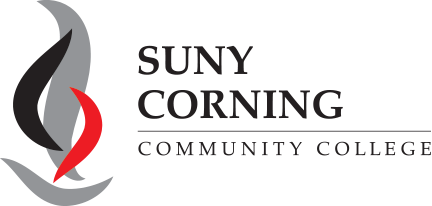
- Type: Public community college
- Established: 1957; 69 years ago
- Parent institution: State University of New York
- President: Dr. Terence L. Finley
- Undergraduates: 3,722 (fall 2025)
- Location: Corning, New York, U.S. 42.117258°N 77.073544°W
- Campus: Suburban, 550 acres (220 ha)
- Colors: Red & white
- Nickname: Red Barons
- Sporting affiliations: National Junior College Athletic Association, Mid-State Athletic Conference
- Mascot: Red Baron
- Website: www.corning-cc.edu

Corning Community College is a public community college in Corning, New York. It was initiated in 1957 and moved to its Spencer Hill campus in 1963. This two-year college serves three counties: Steuben, Chemung, and Schuyler. It is one of the community colleges in the SUNY system.

== Campus and programs ==
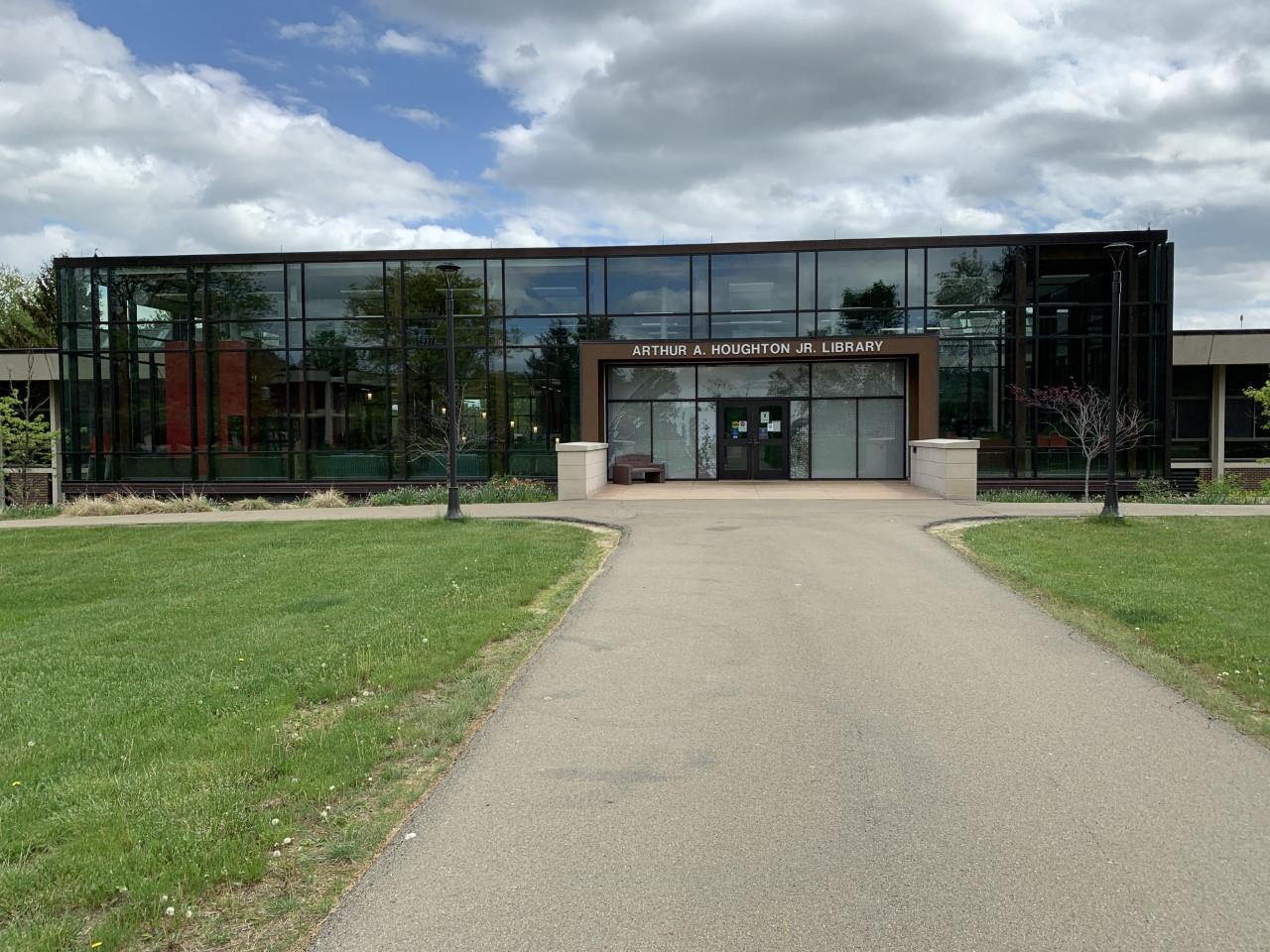
Arthur Houghton Library at Corning Community College

The college offers Associate of Sciences, Associate of Arts, Applied Associate of Science, Associate of Occupation Studies and a number of certificates as well.

The college also operates the Eileen M. Collins Observatory.

== Notable alumni ==
- Eileen Collins, ‘76, Retired Colonel, U.S. Air Force, and Commander, NASA
- Stephen D. Daley, ‘68, Senior VP of Media Relations, Porter Novelli
