= STS-93 =

1999 American crewed spaceflight to deploy the Chandra X-ray Observatory

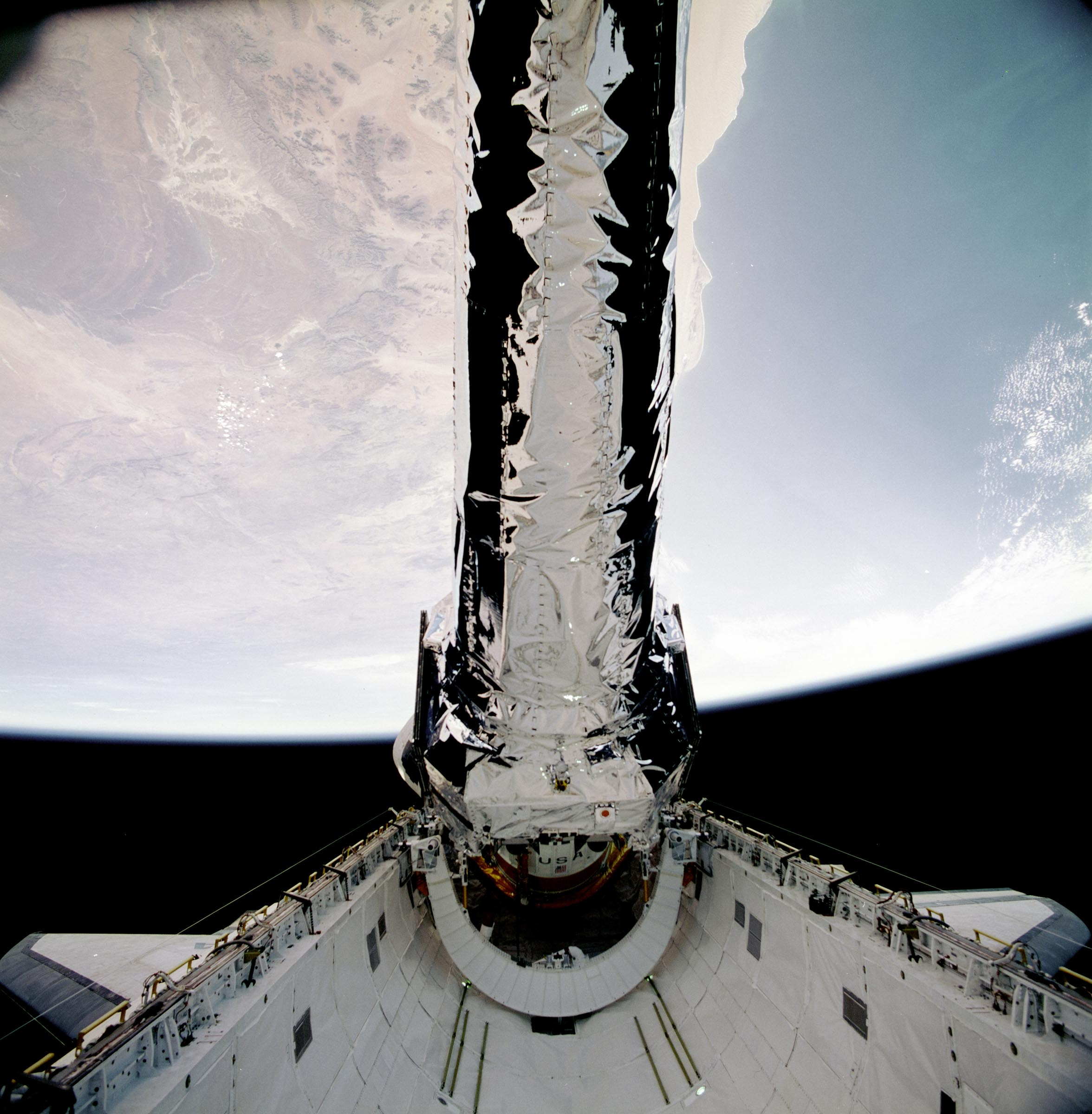
- Chandra and its Inertial Upper Stage, prior to deployment from Columbia's payload bay
- Names: Space Transportation System-93
- Mission type: Chandra X-ray Observatory deployment
- Operator: NASA
- COSPAR ID: 1999-040A
- SATCAT no.: 25866
- Mission duration: 4 days, 22 hours, 49 minutes, 34 seconds
- Distance travelled: 2,890,000 km (1,796,000 mi)
- Orbits completed: 80

Spacecraft properties
- Spacecraft: Space Shuttle Columbia
- Launch mass: 122,534 kg (270,142 lb)
- Landing mass: 99,781 kg (219,980 lb)
- Payload mass: 22,780 kg (50,222 lb)

Crew
- Crew size: 5
- Members: Eileen M. Collins; Jeffrey S. Ashby; Michel Tognini; Steven A. Hawley; Catherine G. Coleman

Start of mission
- Launch date: 23 July 1999, 04:31:00 UTC
- Launch site: Kennedy, LC-39B

End of mission
- Landing date: 28 July 1999, 03:20:35 UTC
- Landing site: Kennedy, SLF Runway 33

Orbital parameters
- Reference system: Geocentric
- Regime: Low Earth
- Perigee altitude: 260 km (160 mi)
- Apogee altitude: 280 km (170 mi)
- Inclination: 28.4°
- Period: 90 minutes
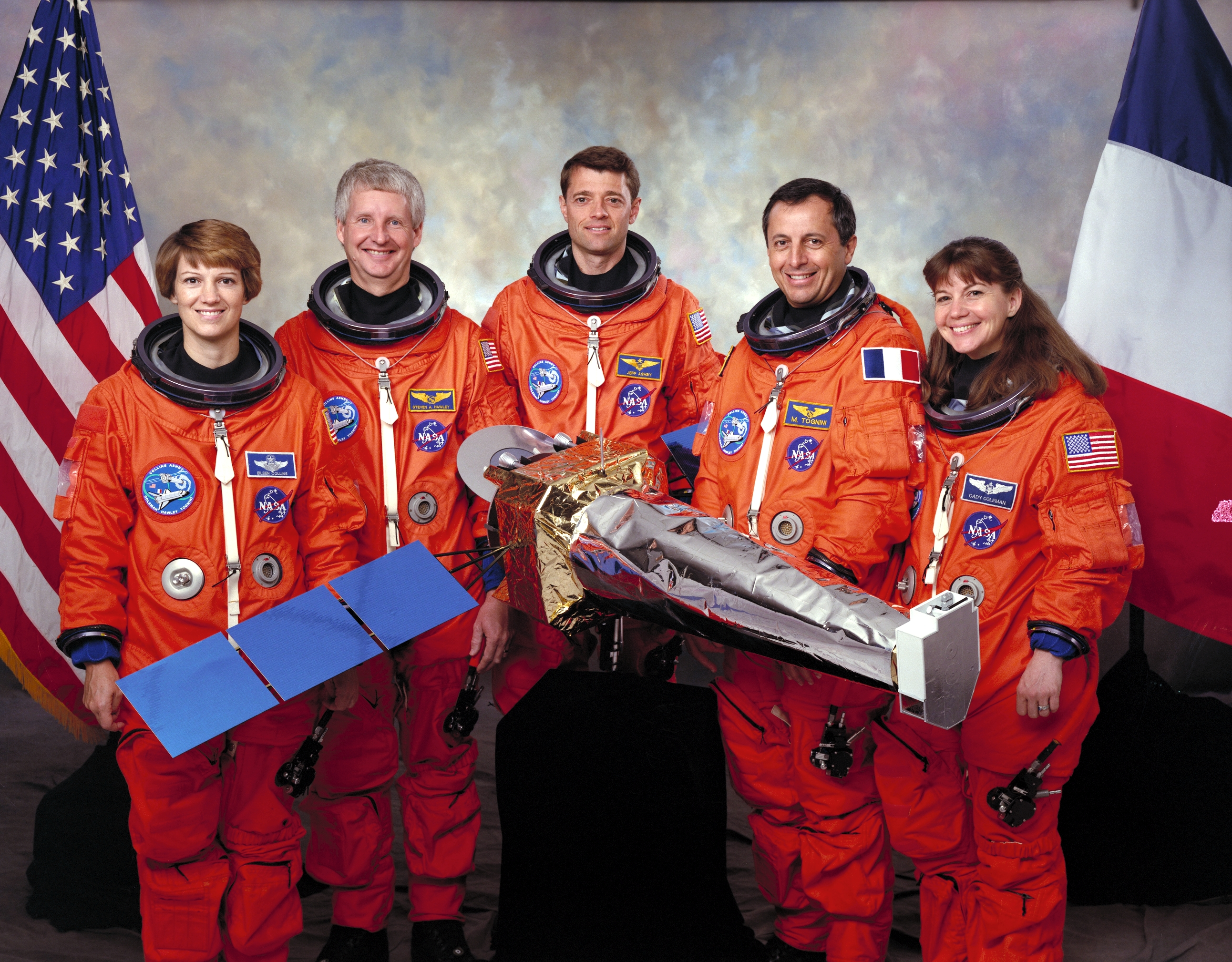
- Left to right: Collins, Hawley, Ashby, Tognini, Coleman Space Shuttle program

STS-93 in 1999 marked the 95th launch of the Space Shuttle, the 26th launch of Columbia, and the 21st night launch of a Space Shuttle. Eileen Collins became the first female shuttle Commander on this flight. Its primary mission was to launch the Chandra X-ray Observatory, the heaviest payload ever carried by the Space Shuttle system, at 22,780 kilograms (50,222 lb).

STS-93 would be Columbia's last mission until March 2002. During the interim, Columbia would be out of service for upgrading and would only fly again on STS-109. The launch was originally scheduled for 20 July, but it was aborted at T−7 seconds. The successful launch of the flight occurred three days later.

== Crew ==
Position	Astronaut
Commander	(United States) Eileen M. Collins; Third spaceflight
Pilot	(United States) Jeffrey S. Ashby; First spaceflight
Mission Specialist 1	(United States) Catherine G. Coleman; Second spaceflight
Mission Specialist 2 Flight Engineer	(United States) Steven A. Hawley; Fifth and last spaceflight
Mission Specialist 3	(France) Michel Tognini, CNES; Second and last spaceflight

=== Crew seat assignments ===
Seat	Launch	Landing	Seats 1–4 are on the flight deck. Seats 5–7 are on the mid-deck.
1	Collins		Seats 1–4 are on the flight deck. Seats 5–7 are on the mid-deck.
2	Ashby		Seats 1–4 are on the flight deck. Seats 5–7 are on the mid-deck.
3	Tognini	Coleman	Seats 1–4 are on the flight deck. Seats 5–7 are on the mid-deck.
4	Hawley		Seats 1–4 are on the flight deck. Seats 5–7 are on the mid-deck.
5	Coleman	Tognini	Seats 1–4 are on the flight deck. Seats 5–7 are on the mid-deck.
6	Unused		Seats 1–4 are on the flight deck. Seats 5–7 are on the mid-deck.
7	Unused		Seats 1–4 are on the flight deck. Seats 5–7 are on the mid-deck.

== Problems during ascent ==
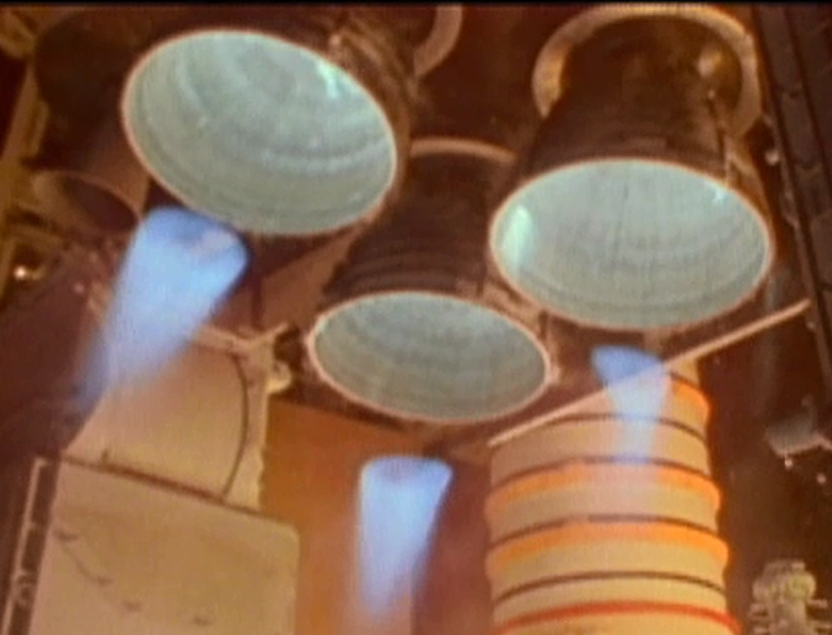
STS-93 SSME hydrogen coolant nozzle leak at liftoff, visible as a bright streak in the right engine nozzle

During the main engine ignition sequence, a gold pin used to plug an oxidizer post in the Space Shuttle's number three (right) engine came loose and was violently ejected, striking the engine nozzle's inner surface and tearing open three cooling tubes containing hydrogen. These ruptures resulted in a leak upstream of the main combustion chamber. This anomalous event and the automatic response to the leak by the right engine's controller did not violate any launch commit criteria and liftoff proceeded normally. However, approximately 5 seconds after liftoff, an electrical short disabled the center engine's primary digital control unit, DCU-A, and the right engine's backup unit, DCU-B. The center and right engines continued to operate on their remaining DCUs for the rest of powered flight to orbit. The redundant set of DCUs in each engine controller saved Columbia and her crew from potential catastrophe, as shutdown of two engines at that point in the flight would have resulted in a very risky contingency abort with no guarantee of success. The electrical short was later discovered to have been caused by poorly routed wiring, which had rubbed on an exposed screw head. This wiring issue led to a program-wide inspection of the wiring in all orbiters.

Because of the leak in the right engine, its controller sensed a decrease in power or thrust—measured indirectly as main combustion chamber pressure—since the leaking hydrogen was not being burned in the SSME's two pre-burners or the main combustion chamber. To bring the engine back up to the commanded thrust level, the controller opened the oxidizer valves a bit more than normal. The hydrogen leak and increased oxidizer consumption resulted in the right engine deviating from the desired oxygen/hydrogen mixing ratio of 6.03 and running hotter than normal. The increased oxidizer consumption during ascent resulted in a premature shutdown of all three engines near the end of the projected burn due to low liquid-oxygen level sensed in the External Tank. Though the premature shutdown resulted in a velocity 15 ft/s (4.6 m/s) lower than targeted, the vehicle safely achieved its intended orbit and completed the mission as planned. This incident brought on a maintenance practice change that required damaged oxidizer posts to be removed and replaced as opposed to being intentionally plugged, as was the practice beforehand.

Three days previously, in the first launch attempt, the launch was stopped at T−7 seconds, just prior to the SSMEs' ignition sequence, due to a senior console operator manually triggering a cutoff in the countdown. It was later determined that the console operator, monitoring the hydrogen gas concentration in the Space Shuttle's aft compartment, where the three SSMEs are located, saw a hydrogen increase spike above the Launch Commit Criteria redline, for a single sample just prior to main engine start. Subsequent troubleshooting and analysis indicated the most likely cause was the mass spectrometer instrument experienced a data anomaly in the high vacuum region of the instrument for a single sample. The system performance was nominal prior to the cut-off and during subsequent launch attempts.

== Mission objectives ==
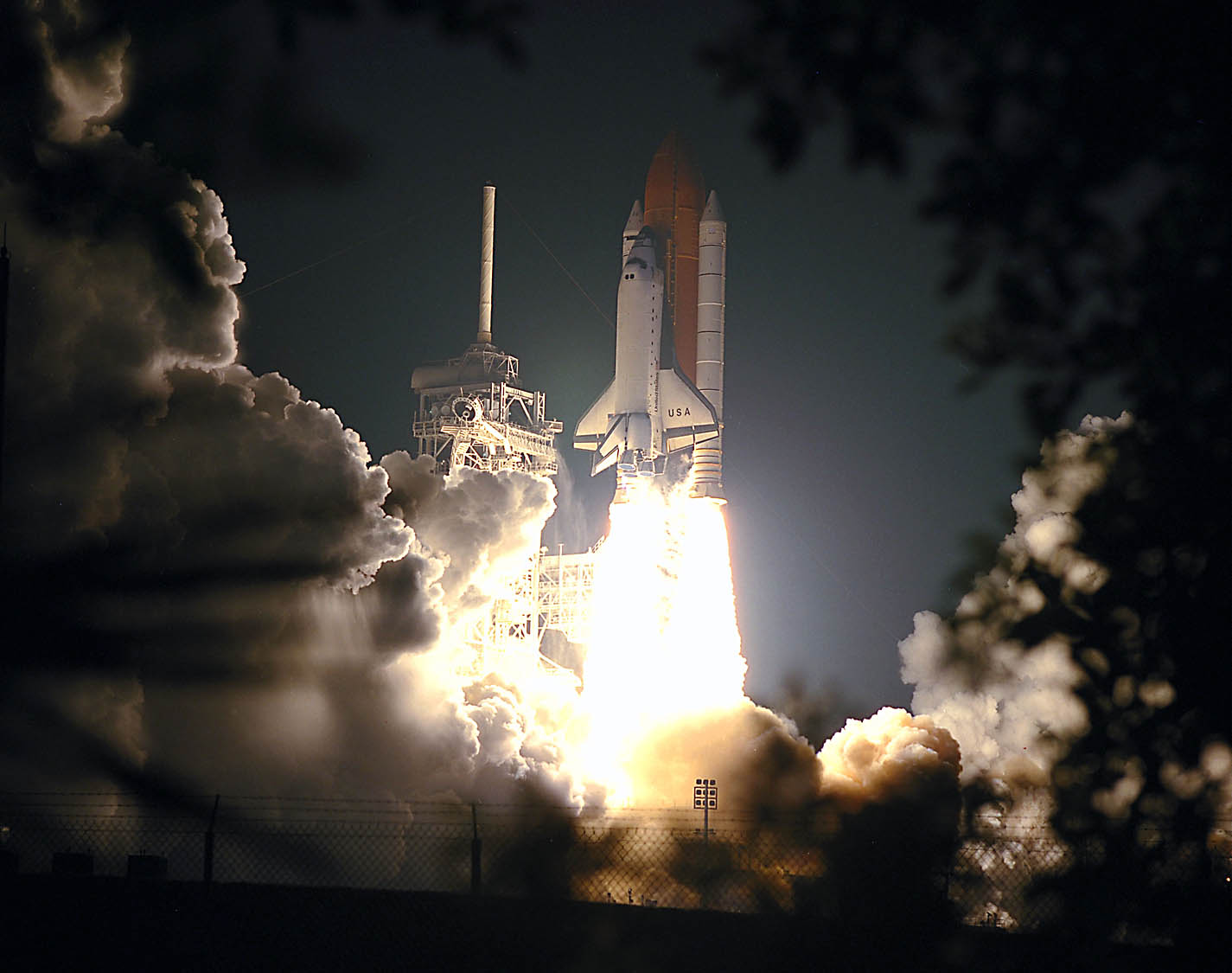
STS-93 launch

The primary objective of the STS-93 mission was to deploy the Chandra X-ray Observatory (formerly the Advanced X-ray Astrophysics Facility) with its Inertial Upper Stage booster. At its launch, Chandra was the most sophisticated X-ray observatory ever built. It is designed to observe X-rays from high energy regions of the universe, such as hot gas in the remnants of exploded stars.

Other payloads on STS-93 included the Midcourse Space Experiment (MSX), the Shuttle Ionospheric Modification with Pulsed Local Exhaust (SIMPLEX), the Southwest Ultraviolet Imaging System (SWUIS), the Gelation of Sols: Applied Microgravity Research (GOSAMR) experiment, the Space Tissue Loss – B (STL-B) experiment, a Light mass Flexible Solar Array Hinge (LFSAH), the Cell Culture Module (CCM), the Shuttle Amateur Radio Experiment – II (SAREX – II), EarthKAM, Plant Growth Investigations in Microgravity (PGIM), the Commercial Generic Bioprocessing Apparatus (CGBA), the Micro-Electrical Mechanical System (MEMS), and the Biological Research in Canisters (BRIC).

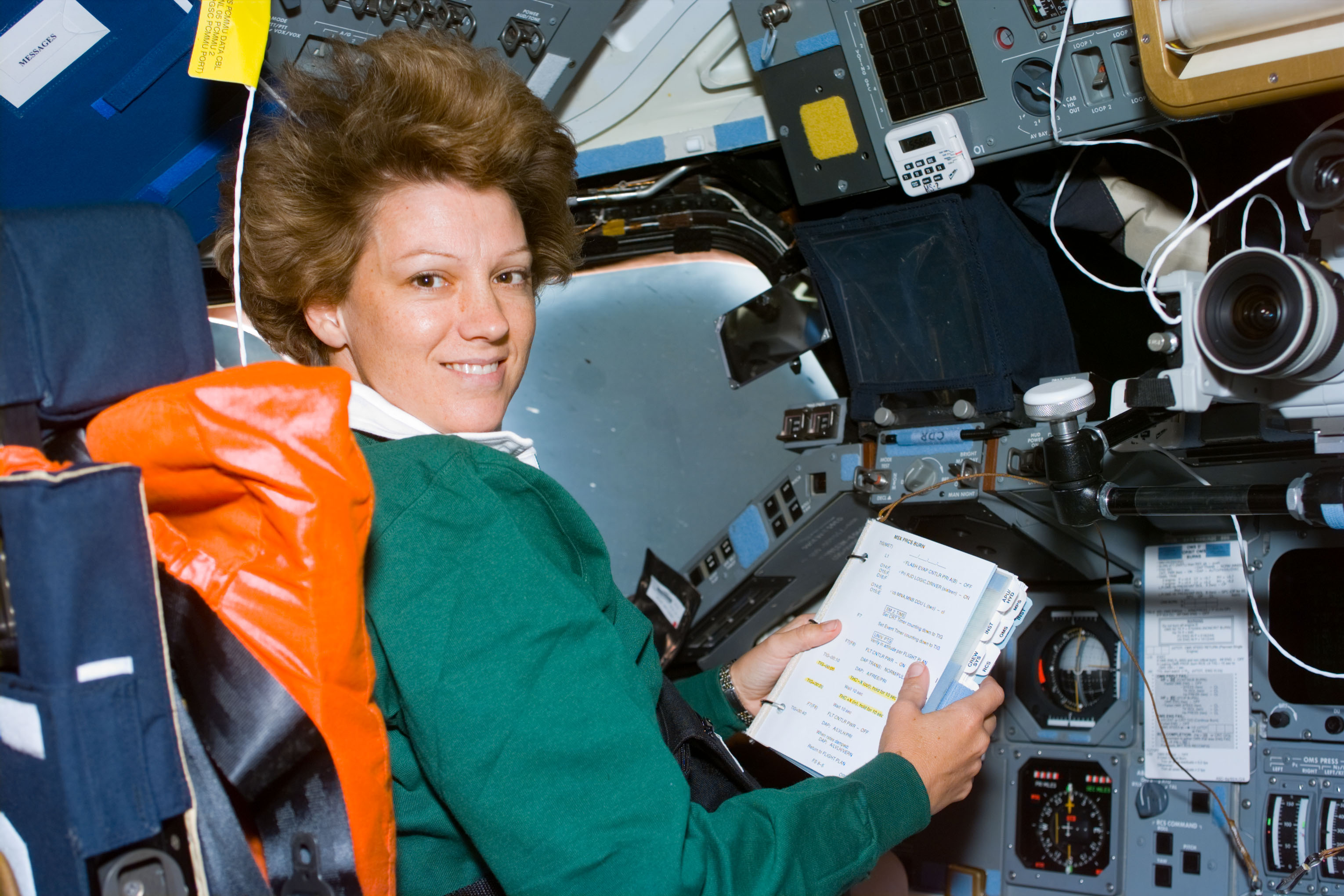
Eileen Collins became the first woman to command a Space Shuttle during this mission.

The Shuttle Ionospheric Modification with Pulsed Local Exhaust (SIMPLEX) payload activity researched the source of Very High Frequency (VHF) radar echoes caused by the orbiter and its OMS engine firings. The Principal Investigator (PI) used the collected data to examine the effects of orbital kinetic energy on ionospheric irregularities and to understand the processes that take place with the venting of exhaust materials.

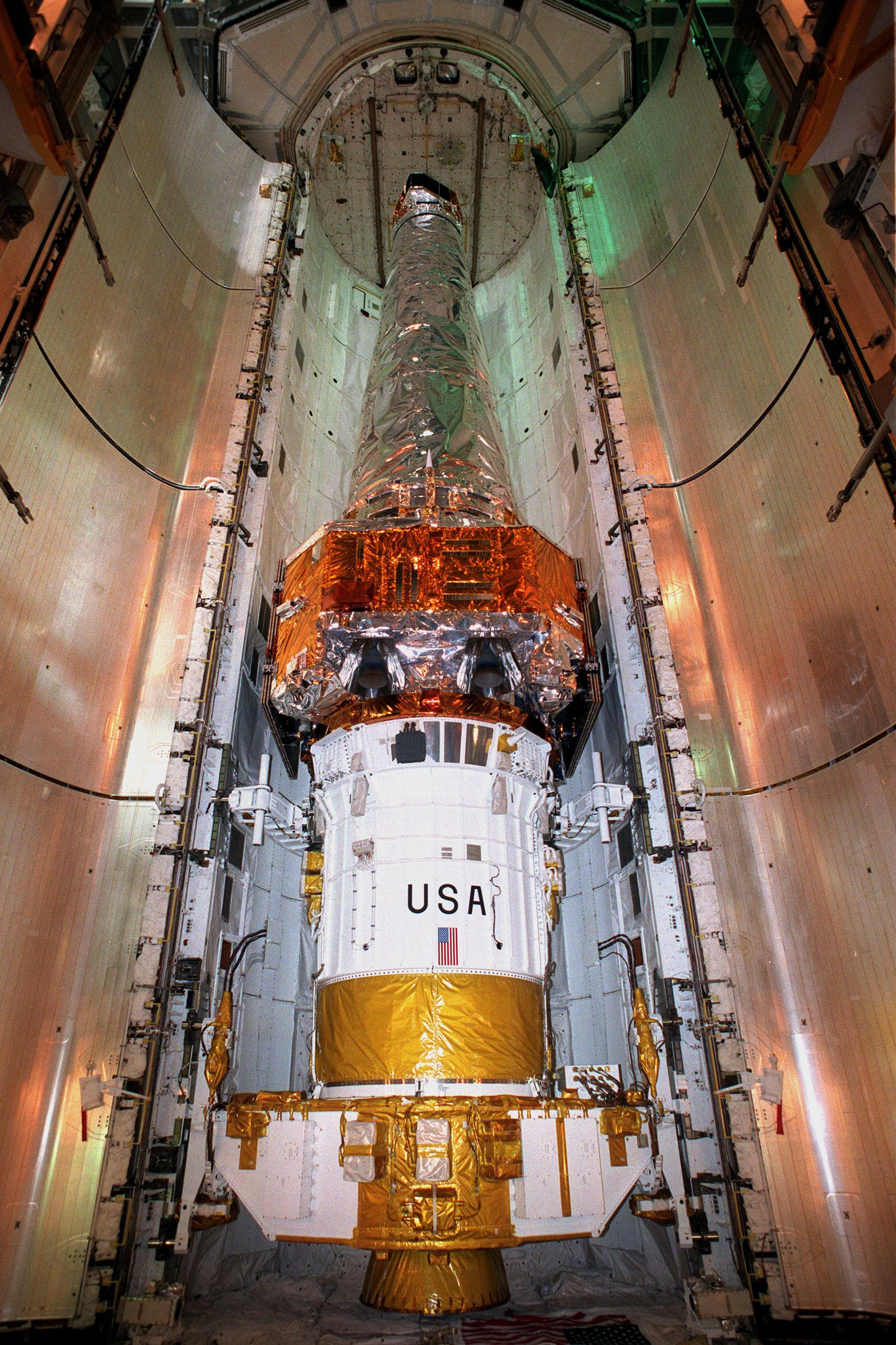
Chandra X-ray Observatory sits inside the payload bay for Columbia's mission STS-93.

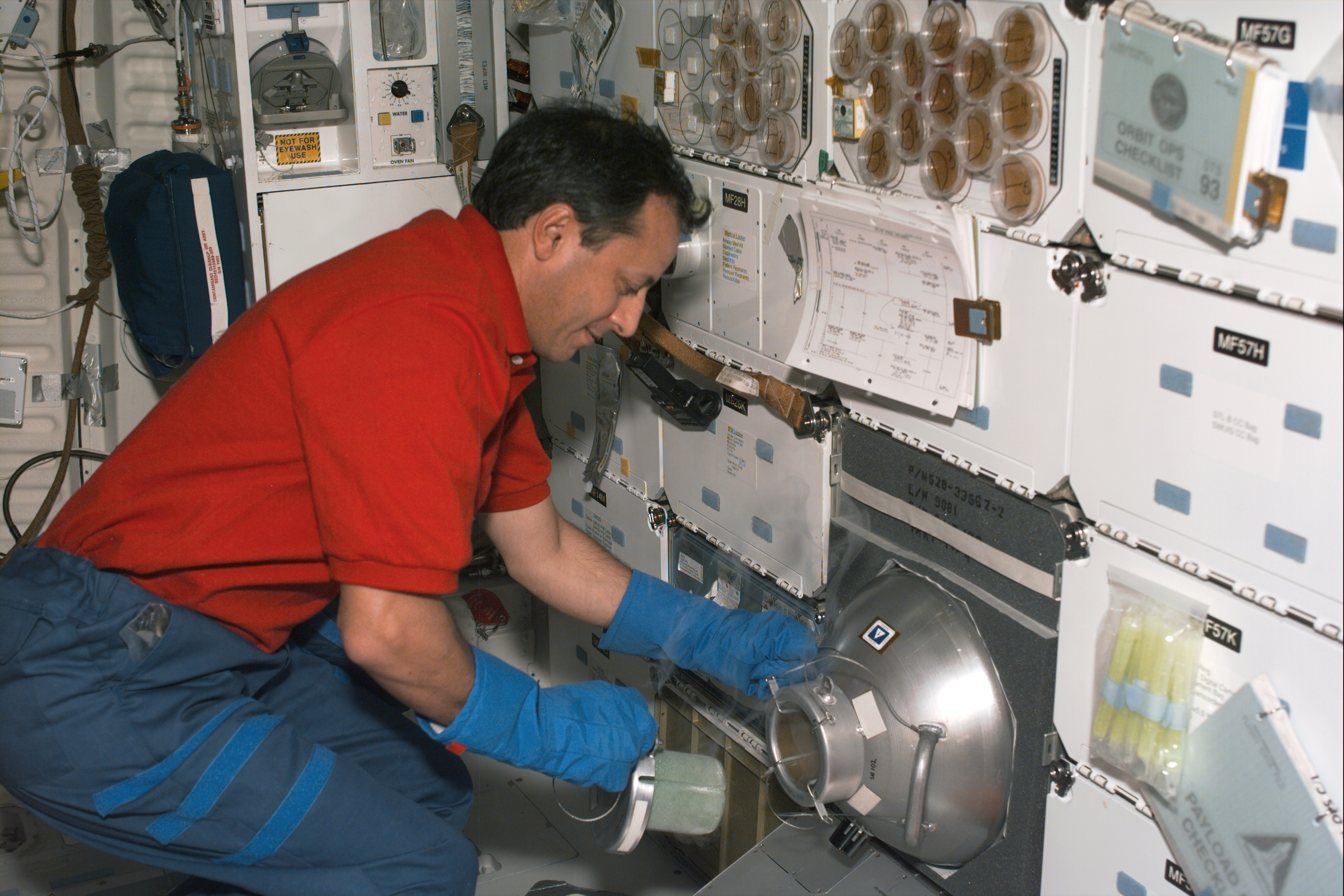
CNES astronaut Michel Tognini works with a nitrogen freezer, which supported the Plant Growth Investigations in Microgravity (PGIM) and Biological Research in Canisters (BRIC) experiments on this mission which took place in 1999

The Southwest Ultraviolet Imaging system (SWUIS) was based around a Maksutov-design ultraviolet (UV) telescope and a UV-sensitive, image-intensified charge-coupled device (CCD) camera that frames at video frame rates. Scientists can obtain sensitive photometric measurements of astronomical targets.

The objective Gelation of Sols: Applied Microgravity Research (GOSAMR) experiment was to investigate the influence of microgravity on the processing of gelled sols. In particular, the purpose was to demonstrate that composite ceramic precursors composed of large particulates and small colloidal sols can be produced in space with more structural uniformity.

The focus of the Space Tissue Loss – B (STL-B) experiment was direct video observation of cells in culture through the use of a video microscope imaging system with the objective of demonstrating near real-time interactive operations to detect and induce cellular responses.

The Light mass Flexible Solar Array Hinge (LFSAH) payload consisted of several hinges fabricated from shape memory alloys. Shape memory deployment hinges offered controlled shockless deployment of solar arrays and other spacecraft appendages. LFSAH demonstrated this deployment capability for a number of hinge configurations.

The objectives of the Cell Culture Module (CCM) were to validate models for muscle, bone, and endothelial cell biochemical and functional loss induced by microgravity stress; to evaluate cytoskeleton, metabolism, membrane integrity and protease activity in target cells; and to test tissue loss medications.

The Shuttle Amateur Radio Experiment (SAREX-II) demonstrated the feasibility of amateur short-wave radio contacts between the shuttle and ground-based amateur radio operators. SAREX also served as an educational opportunity for schools around the world to learn about space by speaking directly to astronauts aboard the shuttle via amateur radio.

The EarthKAM payload was flown but not operated, due to schools being out of session for the summer.

The Plant Growth Investigations in Microgravity (PGIM) payload experiment used plants to monitor the space flight environment for stressful conditions that affect plant growth. Because plants cannot move away from stressful conditions, they have developed mechanisms that monitor their environment and direct effective physiological responses to harmful conditions.

The Commercial Generic Bioprocessing Apparatus (CGBA) payload hardware allowed for sample processing and stowage functions. The Generic Bioprocessing Apparatus – Isothermal Containment Module (GBA-ICM) was temperature controlled to maintain a preset temperature environment, controlled the activation and termination of the experiment samples, and provided an interface for crew interaction, control and data transfer.

The Micro-Electrical Mechanical System (MEMS) payload examined the performance, under launch, microgravity, and reentry conditions of a suite of MEMS devices. These devices included accelerometers, gyroscopes, and environmental and chemical sensors. The MEMS payload was self-contained and required activation and deactivation only.

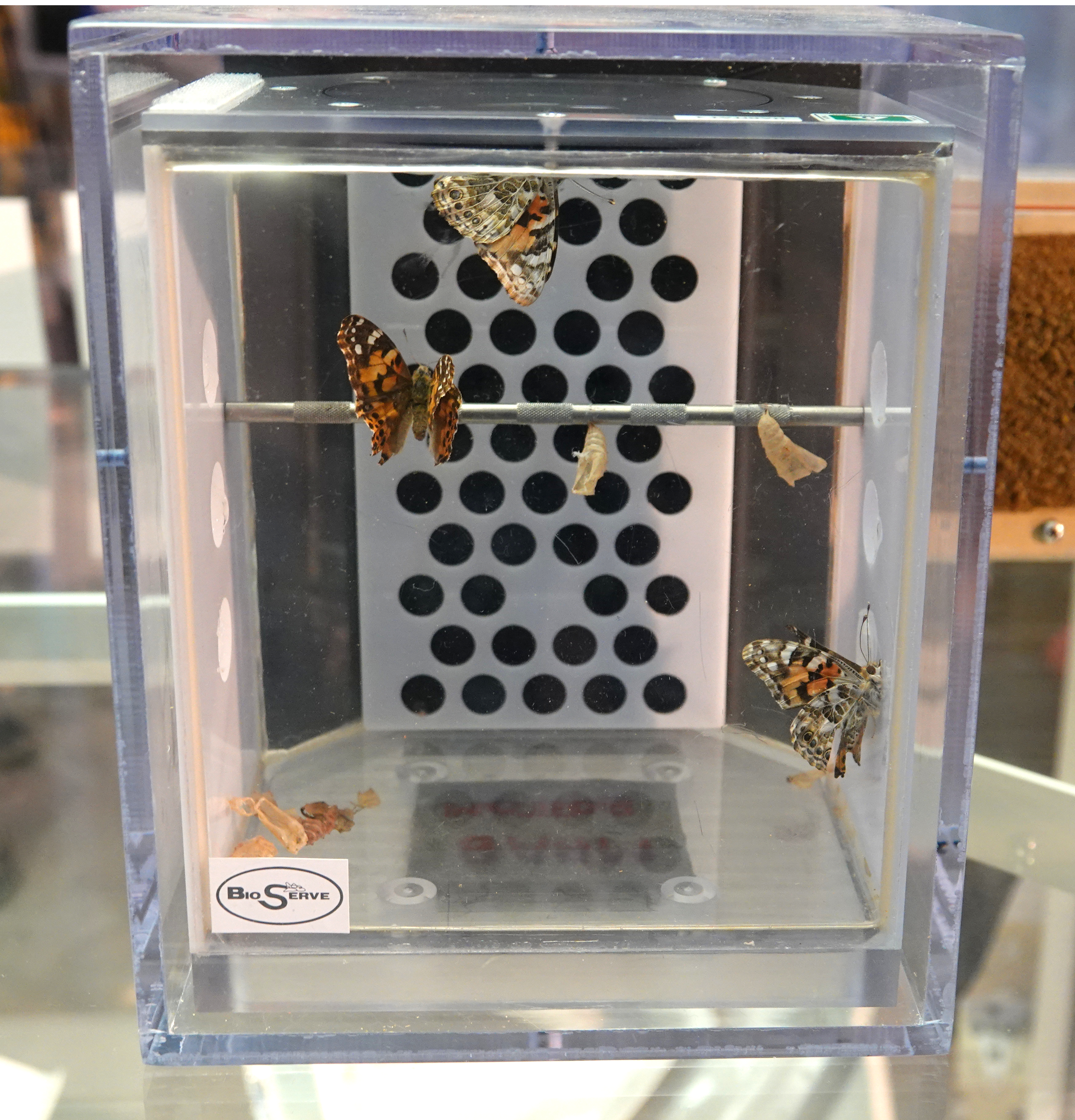
Butterflies and habitat

The Biological Research in Canisters (BRIC) payload was designed to investigate the effects of space flight on small arthropod animals and plant specimens. The flight crew was available at regular intervals to monitor and control payload/experiment operations.

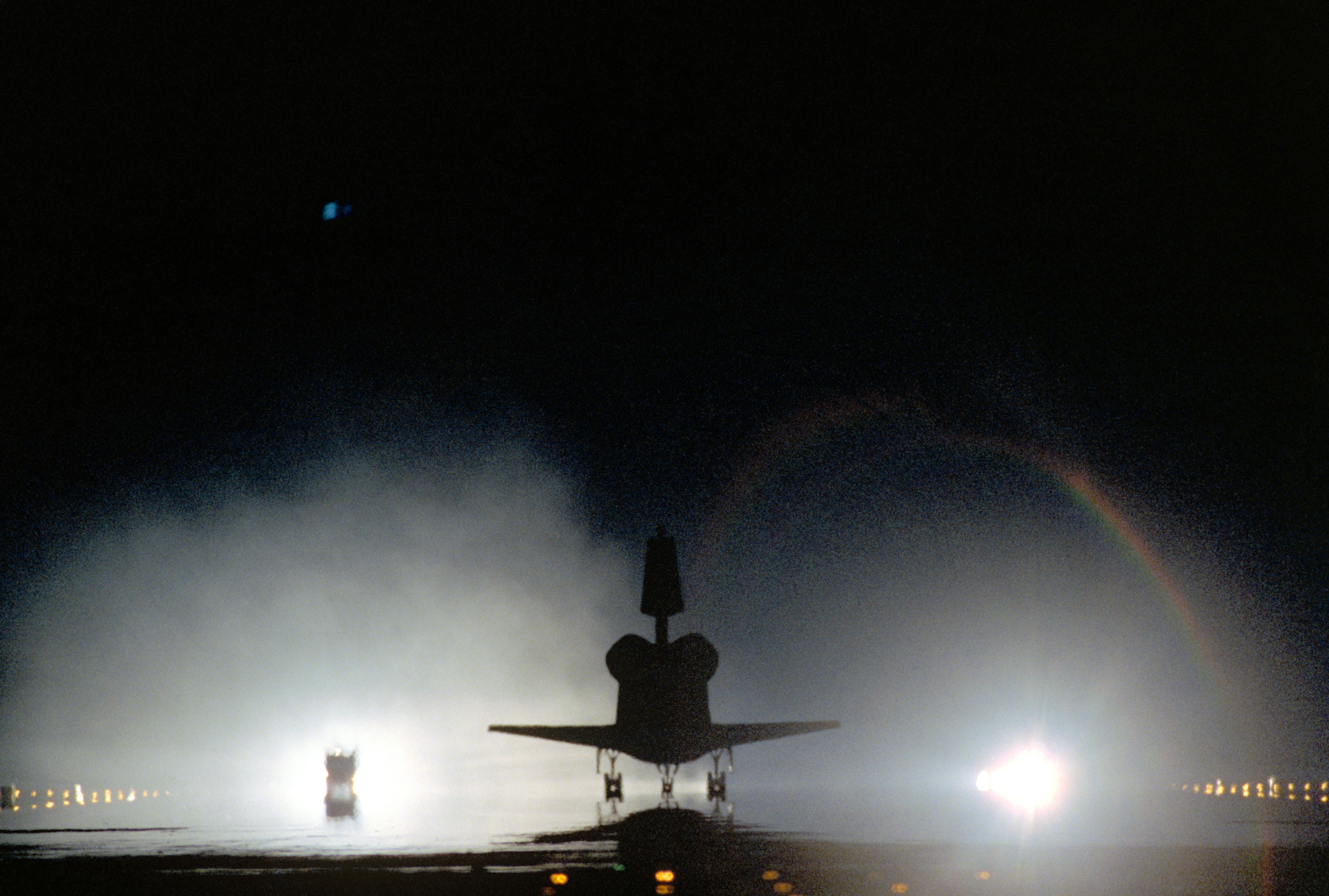
Space Shuttle Columbia lands at KSC.

Columbia's landing at Kennedy Space Center marked the twelfth night landing in the Shuttle program's history. Five had been at Edwards Air Force Base in California and the rest KSC. To date, there had been 19 consecutive landings at KSC and 25 of the last 26 had been there.

== Launch attempts ==
Attempt	Planned	Result	Turnaround	Reason	Decision point	Weather go (%)	Notes
1	20 Jul 1999, 12:36:00 am	Scrubbed	—	Technical	20 Jul 1999, 12:35 am (T−00:00:07)	70	Excessive hydrogen detected.
2	22 Jul 1999, 12:28:00 am	Scrubbed	1 day 23 hours 52 minutes	Weather	22 Jul 1999, 1:18 am (T−00:05:00)	Initially 100, later deteriorated	Although the weather was initially reported 100%, a thunderstorm unexpectedly developed and moved towards KSC.
3	23 Jul 1999, 12:31:00 am	Success	1 day 0 hours 3 minutes			80	T−20 minute hold extended due to a communications problem. An electrical short with two SSME controllers occurred five seconds after liftoff, and all three engines shut down prematurely seven miles short of the intended orbit due to a hydrogen leak.

== Special cargo ==
In 2001, Coin World reported the revelation (via a FOIA document request) that the United States Mint had struck 39 examples of the 2000 Sacagawea dollar in gold in June 1999 at the West Point Mint. The planchets came from specially prepared ½ troy-oz $25 American Gold Eagle Bullion Planchets. Why they were struck is not known; speculation is that this was an attempt by the mint to offer "Premium" collectibles in conjunction with the newly released Sacagawea dollar in 2000.

Twenty-seven were soon melted and the remaining 12 were on board Space Shuttle Columbia for the July 1999 STS-93 mission. Two examples then popped up at two separate events; one during a Private Congressional Dinner in August 1999, and another example at the Official First-Strike ceremonies in November. The coins remained at Mint Headquarters under lock and key until they were transferred in 2001 to Fort Knox. The strikes are considered to be illegal due to the Coinage regulations in place.

In 2007, the Mint announced it would for the first time publicly display the 12 space-flown gold dollars at the American Numismatic Association's World's Fair of Money in Milwaukee, Wisconsin.

== Wake-up calls ==
Sleeping shuttle astronauts were often awakened with a short piece of music, a tradition that began during the Gemini and Apollo missions. Each track was specially chosen, sometimes by their families, and usually had a special meaning to an individual member of the crew or was applicable to their daily activities.

Flight day	Song	Artist/composer	Played for	Link
Day 2	"Beep! Beep!"	Louis Prima	Eileen Collins	WAV
Day 3	"Brave New Girls"	Teresa	Catherine Coleman	WAV
Day 4	"Someday Soon"	Judy Collins / Suzy Bogguss	Jeff Ashby	WAV
Day 5	"The Sound of Silence"	Simon and Garfunkel	Michel Tognini	WAV
Day 6	"A Little Traveling Music" "The Air Force Song"	Barry Manilow; Robert MacArthur Crawford	Steven Hawley; Eileen Collins, Catherine Coleman	WAV
