= Michel Tognini =

French test pilot, engineer, airman, & astronaut (born 1949)

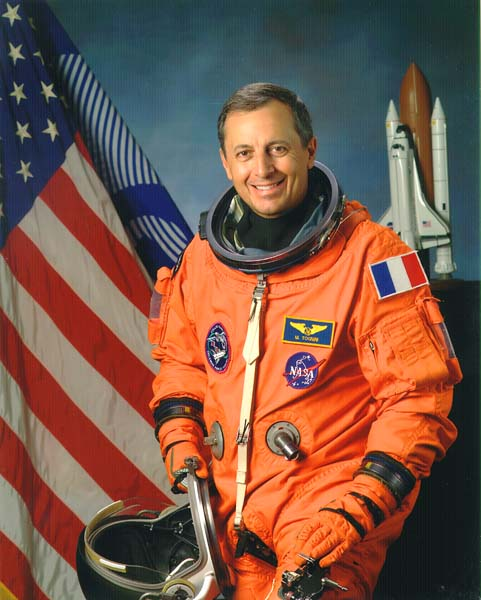
- Born: 30 September 1949 (age 77); Vincennes, France
- Occupation: Test Pilot
- Space career

CNES/ESA astronaut
- Status: Retired
- Rank: Brigadier General, French Air Force
- Time in space: 18d 17h 46m
- Selection: 1985 CNES Group 2, NASA Group 15 (1994), 1999 ESA Group
- Missions: Soyuz TM-15/14, STS-93
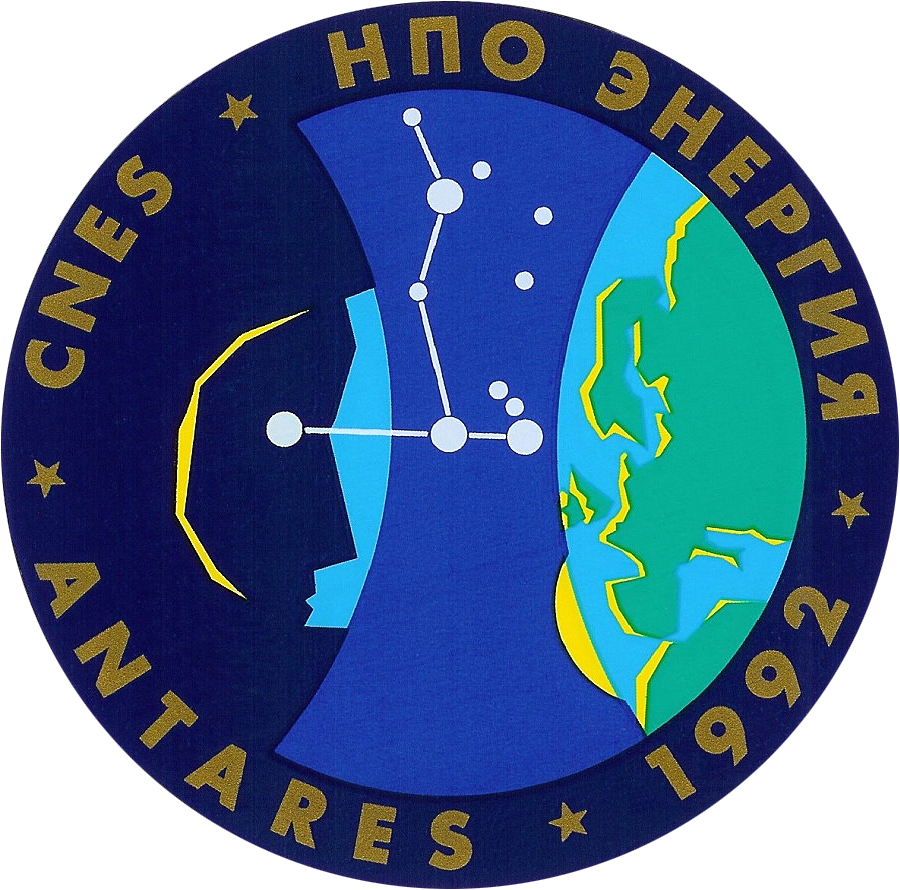
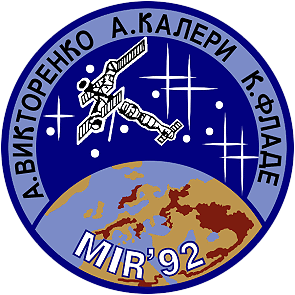
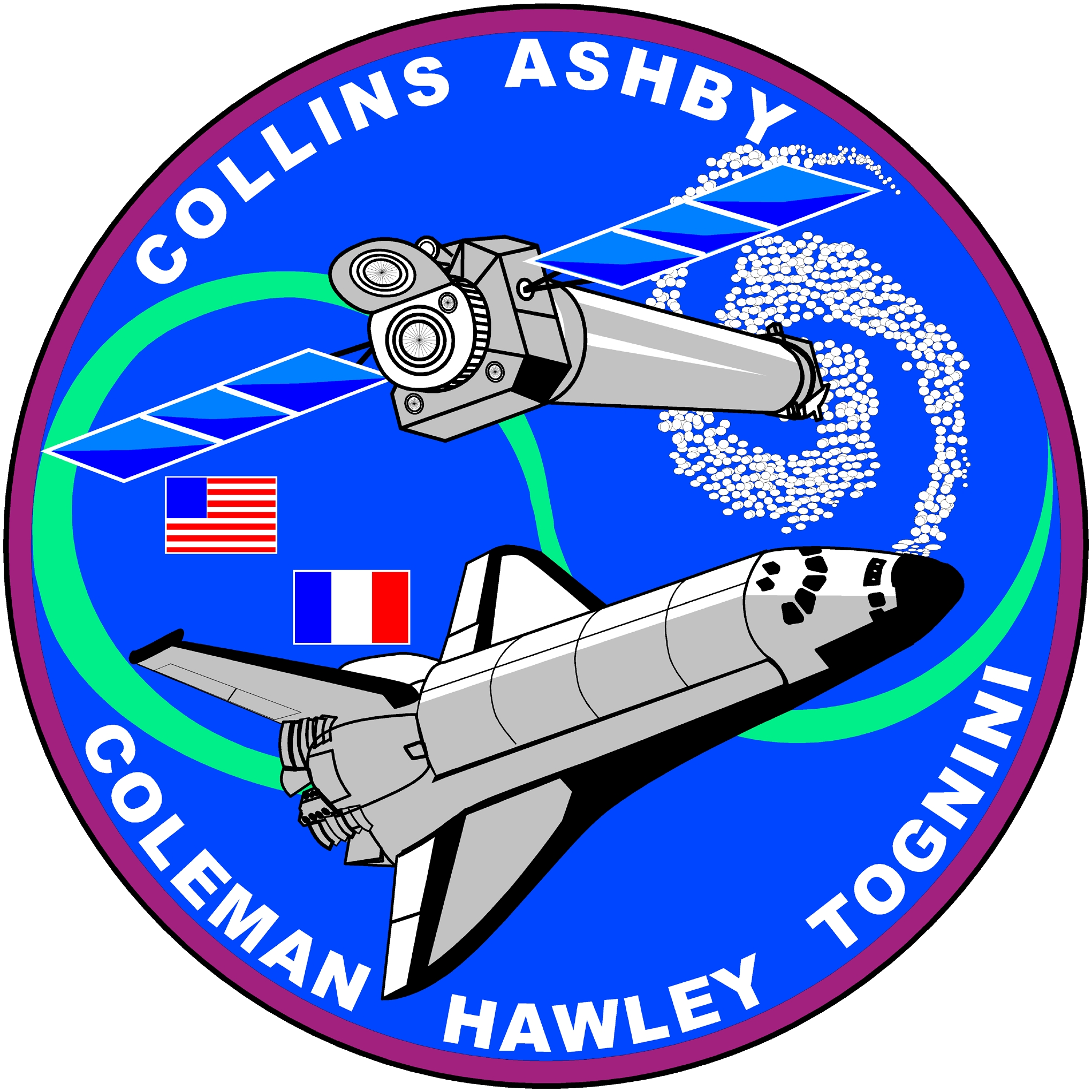
- Mission insignia

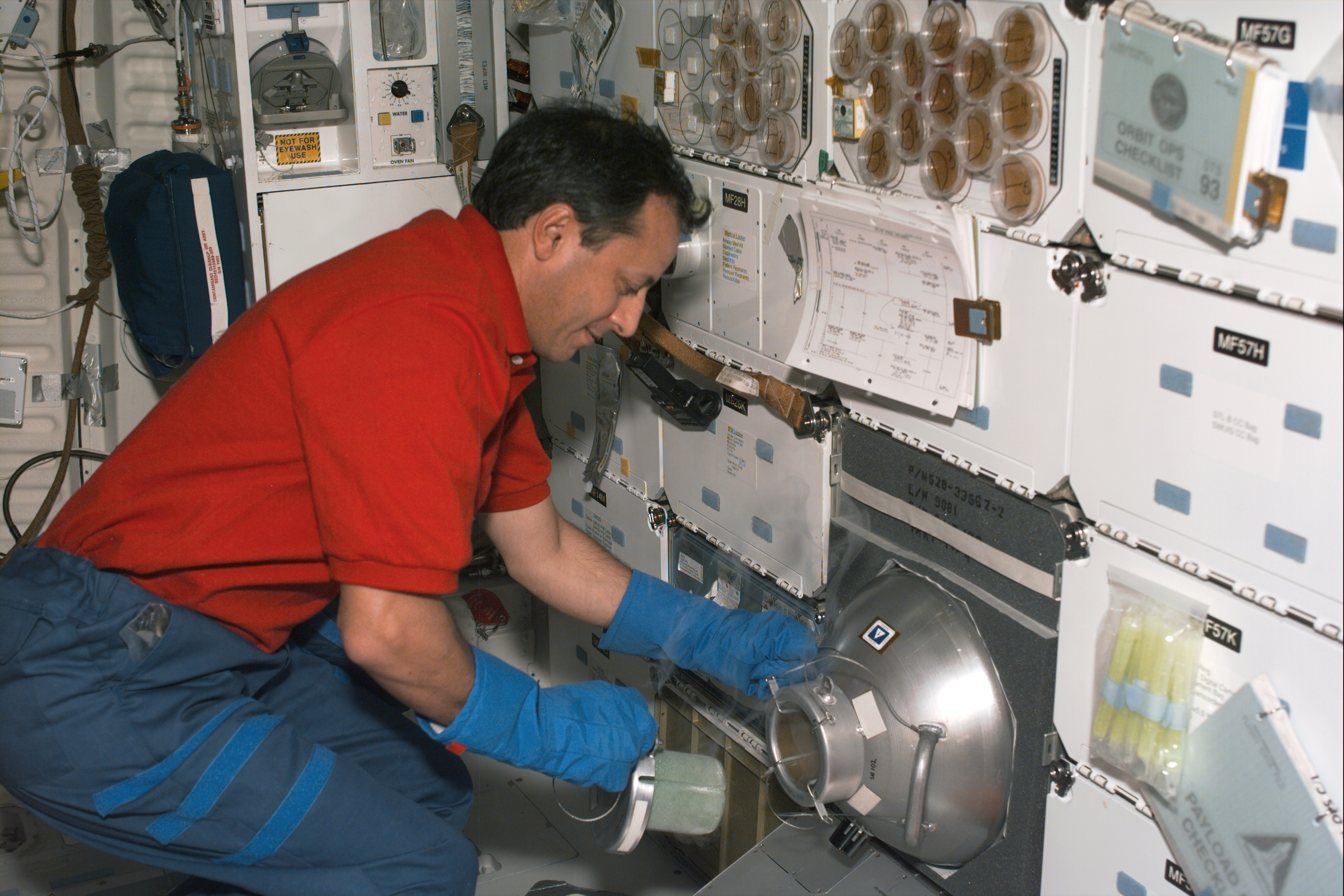
CNES astronaut Michel Tognini works with a nitrogen freezer on the STS-93 Space Shuttle mission, which supported the Plant Growth Investigations in Microgravity (PGIM) and Biological Research in Canisters (BRIC) experiments on this mission which took place in 1999. This mission also launched the Chandra X-ray telescope.

Michel Ange-Charles Tognini (born 30 September 1949 in Vincennes, France) is a French test pilot, engineer, brigadier general in the French Air Force, and a former CNES and ESA astronaut who served from 1 January 2005 to 1 November 2011 as head of the European Astronaut Centre of the European Space Agency. A veteran of two space flights, Tognini has logged a total of 19 days in space. Tognini has 4000 flight hours on 80 types of aircraft (mainly fighter aircraft, including the MiG-25, Tupolev Tu-154, Lightning MK-3 and MK-5, Gloster Meteor, and F-104). He is fluent in English and Russian.

== Early life ==
Tognini was born on 30 September 1949 in Vincennes, France. Following graduation from Lycée de Cachan in Paris, He attended EPA Grenoble military school (French: École des pupilles de l'air 749 Grenoble-Montbonnot) and then went on to study at the Ecole de l'Air, graduating in 1973.

== Military career ==
Following graduation from the academy, Tognini was posted to advanced fighter pilot training at a squadron based at Normandie-Niemen where he served for one year before obtaining his advanced fighter pilot training. From 1974–1981, he served in the French Air Force as an operational fighter pilot (Cambrai Air Base), at the 12th Escadre de Chasse, flying SMB2 and Mirage F1 aircraft. During this tour of duty he served as flight leader in 1976, and flight commander in 1979.

In 1982, he was admitted to the Empire Test Pilots' School in Boscombe Down, United Kingdom, and later that year was awarded his test pilot diploma. He was awarded his military studies diploma in 1983. Tognini was then posted to the Cazaux Flight Test Center, France, initially as a test pilot and subsequently as chief test pilot. During his time there, he helped test a great deal of French flight hardware. He did the weapon systems testing for the Mirage 2000-C, Mirage 2000-N, Jaguar ATLIS, and FLIR aircraft, and was also responsible for flight safety for pilots, experimenters and flight engineers.

== Astronaut career ==
In 1985, France opened a recruitment program to expand its astronaut corps, and Tognini was one of seven candidates selected by CNES. In July 1986, he was one of four candidates to undergo medical examinations in Moscow. In August 1986, he was assigned as a back-up crew member for the Soyuz TM-7 mission. Although Tognini remained a French Air Force officer, he was placed on detachment to CNES for his space flight activities from September 1986 onwards. In November 1986 he reported to the Yuri Gagarin Cosmonaut Training Center, Star City, Russia, for alternate cosmonaut training, including EVA, for the Soviet-French ARAGATZ mission.

During 1989–1990 he supported the Hermes program in Toulouse, France.

=== Antares ===
In 1991 he returned to Star City, Russia, to start prime crew training for the third Soviet-French ANTARES mission. During his stay in Russia, Tognini also gained piloting experience of BURAN simulators (MiG-25, Tupolev 154).

Tognini made his first spaceflight on 27 July 1992 aboard Soyuz TM-15 (returning on Soyuz TM-14 on 10 August). Together with Anatoly Solovyev and Sergei Avdeyev he linked up with Mir (ANTARES mission) and joined the crew of Alexander Viktorenko and Alexander Kaleri already on board. They spent 14 days carrying out a program of joint Soviet-French experiments before returning to Earth. He returned to France following the mission. During 1993–94, he attended a training cycle of the French Institute for High Studies of National Defense (IHEDN).

Tognini attended ASCAN Training at the Johnson Space Center during 1995. He was initially assigned to the Operations Planning Branch of the Astronaut Office working technical issues on the International Space Station, and was subsequently assigned to the Robotics Branch. Tognini was then assigned as ISS CAPCOM in Mission Control.

=== STS-93 ===
Following training at the JSC, Tognini was made available for assignment as a space shuttle mission specialist.

Tognini flew aboard Space Shuttle Columbia on STS-93 (22–27 July 1999) (STS: Space transportation System). During the five-day mission his primary task was to assist in the deployment of the Chandra X-Ray Observatory, and to conduct a spacewalk if needed.

He retired from active astronaut status in May 2003.

After having been Head of the European Astronaut Division, he has been the Head of EAC ( European Astronaut Centre) in Cologne, Germany. Now he is in France working for Human Space Exploration with University and performing speeches for general public. He is also the President of GAMA (Groupe Aéronautique du Ministere de l'Air) and President of Space Conseil.

== Awards and honors ==
- Chevalier de l'Ordre National du Mérite
- Commander de l'Ordre de la Légion d'Honneur
- Soviet Order of Friendship between the People
- Russian Order of Friendship between the People
