= Steve Daley (journalist) =

American journalist

Steve Daley (1948 – October 2, 2011) was a newspaper journalist, best known for his work as political correspondent for the Chicago Tribune between 1988 and 1996.

== Early life ==
Daley was born in Corning, New York, in 1948. He attended Corning Community College before moving on to study at American University in Washington, D.C., where he earned a BA in political science.

== Career ==
Following his university graduation, Daley worked as a freelance journalist, supplementing his income by taking bartending work. Whilst working in a restaurant, "The Class Reunion" that was popular with Washington's politicians and journalists, Daley met and struck up a friendship with David Burgin who recruited him to be a sports reporter for the Palo Alto Times.

Daley left California in 1981 having been offered a role as a sports reporter on the Chicago Tribune, a role which also saw him provide sports reports for WGN Radio. During his time at the Tribune, he also worked as a columnist and television critic before being promoted to be national political correspondent in 1988.

Daley spent seven years as part of the White House Press Corps before leaving to join public relations company Porter Novelli in 1996. After thirteen years there, during which he also moonlighted for a short period as an adjunct professor on the Master's course in Communications at Johns Hopkins University, he left to found his own PR firm.

Additional journalism work included (amongst others) contributions to the Washingtonian and the San Francisco Chronicle and the newspaper based comic strip Shoe.

== Personal life ==
Daley married his wife, Jane, in 1992. He died on October 2, 2011, in Arlington, Virginia.
