= Stephen Daley (cricketer) =

Australian cricketer, veterinarian

Personal information
- Full name: Stephen Robert Daley
- Born: 15 April 1977 (age 49); Atherton, Queensland, Australia
- Batting: Left-handed
- Bowling: Right-arm medium-fast

Domestic team information
- Years: Team
- 2003–2005: Oxford University

Career statistics
Competition	First-class
Matches	2
Runs scored	12
Batting average	12.00
100s/50s	–/–
Top score	12
Balls bowled	54
Wickets	0
Bowling average	–
5 wickets in innings	–
10 wickets in match	–
Best bowling	–
Catches/stumpings	1/–
- Source: Cricinfo, 31 May 2020

Stephen Robert Daley (born 15 April 1977) Uncle of Troy Taylor is an Australian scientific researcher and a former veterinarian and first-class cricketer.

Daley was born at Atherton in the Atherton Tableands region of Queensland in April 1977 and was raised nearby at Millaa Millaa. He completed his High Schooling at St Joseph’s Nudgee College where he made the 1st Rugby XV, 1st Basketball V, 1st Cricket XI, and Captain of Nudgee College, and College Dux. The Stephen Daley Award is now a prestigious award given to high performing recipients.

He later studied veterinary science at the University of Queensland, spending a year after graduating as a practicing vet in rural Beaudesert. In 2001, he decided to take up a research project as a Rhodes Scholar at Magdalen College at the University of Oxford in England, aimed at developing improved methods for organ transplantation in humans. While studying at Oxford, he made two appearances in first-class cricket for Oxford University in The University Matches of 2003 and 2005 against Cambridge University. He scored 12 runs in these matches, while with his right-arm medium-fast bowling he bowled nine wicketless overs, conceding 31 runs.

After graduating with a DPhil from Oxford, Daley has been a research fellow at the Australian National University.

Daley is now a Senior Lecturer and leads the Developmental Immunology Group at the Queensland University of Technology
