= Joe F. Edwards Jr. =

American astronaut, aviator and engineer (born 1958)

Joe Edwards
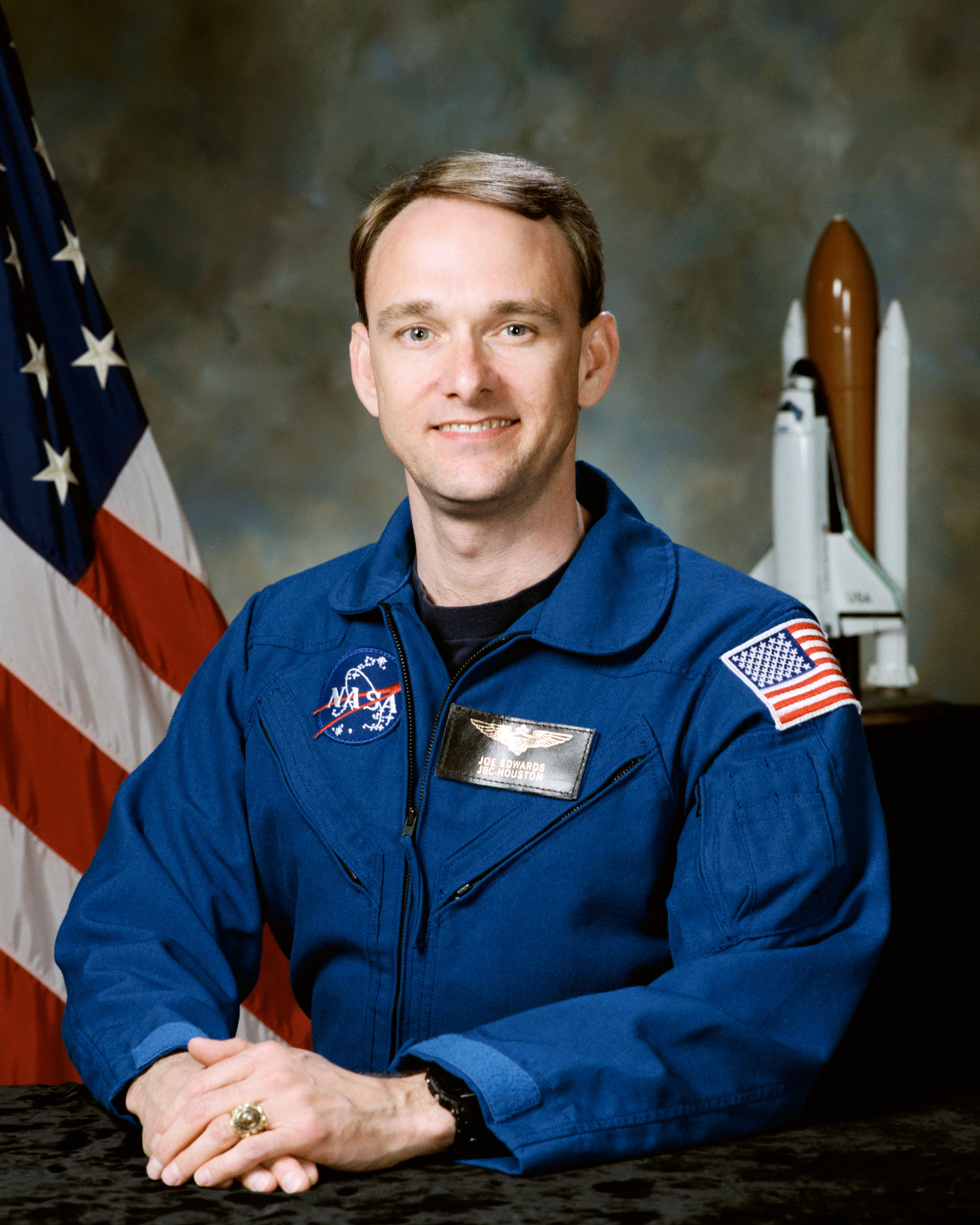
- Born: Joe Frank Edwards Jr. February 3, 1958 (age 68); Richmond, Virginia, U.S.
- Education: United States Naval Academy (BS); University of Tennessee, Knoxville (MS)
- Awards: Distinguished Flying Cross; Air Medal
- Space career

NASA astronaut
- Rank: Commander, USN
- Time in space: 8d 19h 48m
- Selection: NASA Group 15 (1994)
- Mission: STS-89
- Mission insignia
- Retired: April 30, 2000

Joe Frank Edwards Jr. (born February 3, 1958), (Cmdr, USN, Ret.), is an American aerospace engineer, former naval officer, aviator, test pilot and NASA astronaut.

== Early life and education ==
Edwards was born February 3, 1958, in Richmond, Virginia, but considers both Lineville, Alabama, and Roanoke Alabama, to be his hometowns. He graduated from Lineville High School in 1976 and earned a Bachelor of Science degree in Aerospace Engineering from the United States Naval Academy in 1980. In 1994, he received a Master of Science degree in Aviation Systems from University of Tennessee in Knoxville.

== Naval Aviator career ==
Edwards was designated a Naval Aviator in February 1982. He was assigned to Fighter Squadron 143 (VF-143) in 1983, after completion of F-14 Tomcat training, and flew fighter escort and reconnaissance combat missions over Lebanon in 1983.

He graduated from the Navy Fighter Weapons School (TOPGUN) in 1984 and from U.S. Naval Test Pilot School in 1986. He subsequently worked as project flight test officer and pilot for F-14A (PLUS) and F-14D Full Scale Development. He flew the first Navy flight of the F-14D and a high angle of attack/departure from controlled flight test program for the F-14 airframe/F110 engine integration. He served as operations and maintenance officer in Fighter Squadron 142 (VF-142) from 1989 to 1992. He worked as operations officer in the Operations Directorate of the Joint Chiefs of Staff, Washington, D.C. from 1992 to 1994.

He has flown 4,000 hours in over 25 different aircraft and logged over 650 carrier-arrested landings.

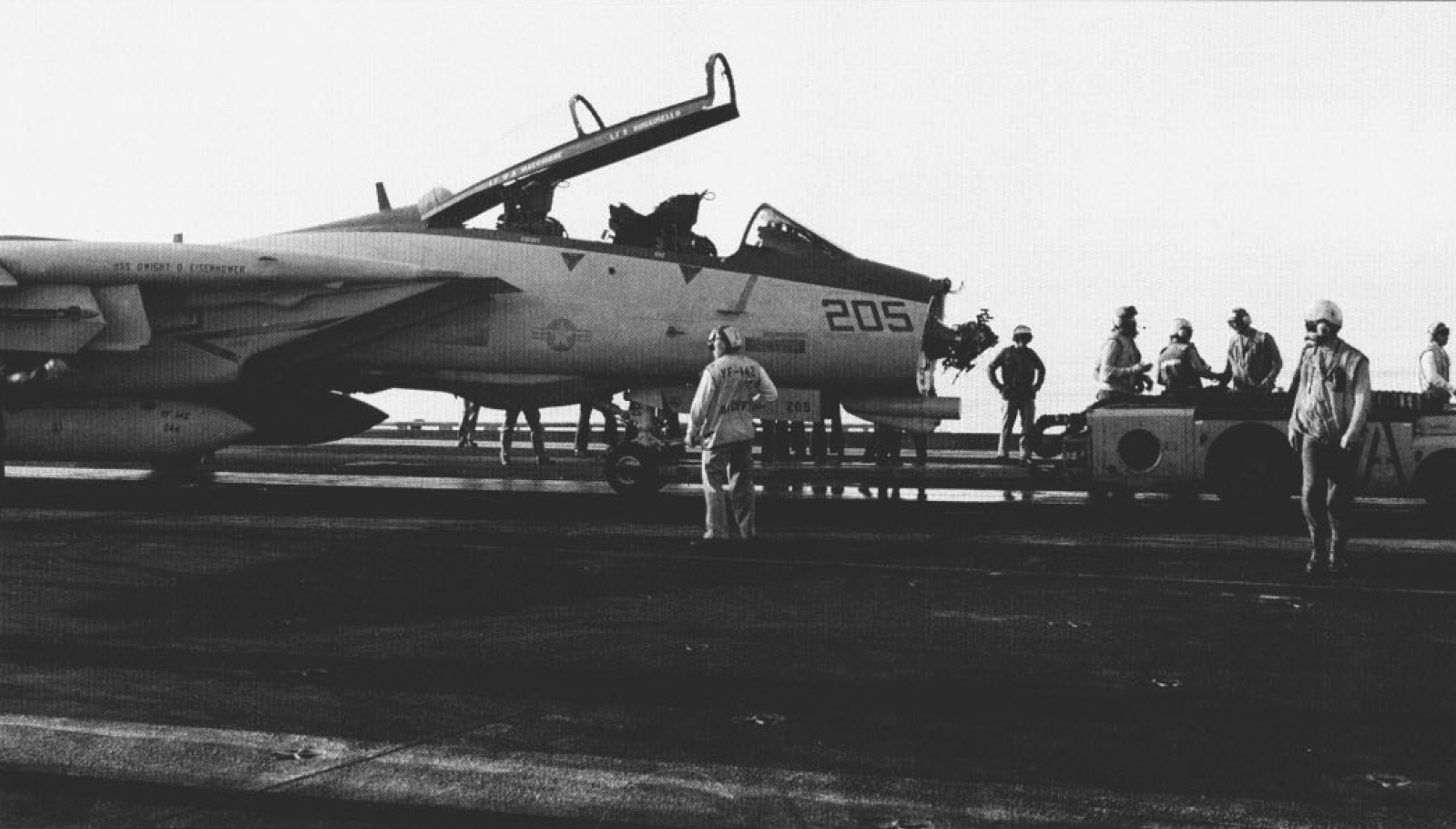
The F-14B which wounded Edwards managed to land on carrier after the radome separated mid-flight. With the radome missing, the radar antenna can be clearly seen.

On November 13, 1991, while serving as maintenance officer of VF-142, he was flying in the Persian Gulf at Mach 0.9 at 29,000 feet (8,800 m) when the radome separated from his airplane, impacted, and destroyed his canopy. With a blinded eye, collapsed lung, broken arm and no communications or flight instruments, he recovered his "convertible" Tomcat with his Radar Intercept Officer LCDR Scott Grundmeier hunkered down in the rear cockpit and landed aboard the aircraft carrier USS Dwight D. Eisenhower. He was awarded the Distinguished Flying Cross for this superior display of airmanship under grave circumstances.

== NASA career ==
Selected as an astronaut by NASA in December 1994, Edwards reported to the Johnson Space Center in March 1995. He worked on technical issues for the Space Shuttle and International Space Station in the Safety Department of the Astronaut Office. He also served as Technical Assistant to the Director, Flight Crew Operations Directorate, NASA Director of Operations (DOR), Russia, and Astronaut CAPCOM representative in Mission Control for Shuttle ascent and entry.

Edwards flew on STS-89 (January 22–31, 1998), the eighth Shuttle-Mir docking mission, during which the crew transferred more than 9,000 pounds (4,100 kg) of scientific equipment, logistical hardware and water from Space Shuttle Endeavour to Mir. In the fifth and last exchange of a U.S. astronaut, STS-89 delivered Andy Thomas to Mir and returned with David Wolf. Mission duration was 8 days, 19 hours and 47 seconds, traveling 3.6 million miles (5.8 million km) in 138 orbits of the Earth.

== Awards and memberships ==
Edwards is a member of the Society of Experimental Test Pilots, Association of Naval Aviation, and the U.S. Naval Institute.

He has received the Defense Superior Service Medal, Distinguished Flying Cross, Defense Meritorious Service Medal, Air Medal, Navy Commendation Medal, Navy Achievement Medal, Daedalian Superior Airmanship Award 1992, Fighter Squadron 143 Fighter Pilot of the Year, 1984, 1985, Fighter Squadron 142 Fighter Pilot of the Year, 1990, 1991, 1992. Carrier Air Wing 7 Pilot of the Year, 1985, 1990, 1991.

== Personal life ==
Edwards retired from NASA and the U.S. Navy on April 30, 2000.

He is married to the former Janet Leigh Ragan of Leonardtown, Maryland. His parents, Joe Frank and Jane McMurray Edwards, are deceased and formerly resided in Roanoke, Alabama.
