= Wendy B. Lawrence =

American astronaut and Navy captain (born 1959)

Wendy Lawrence
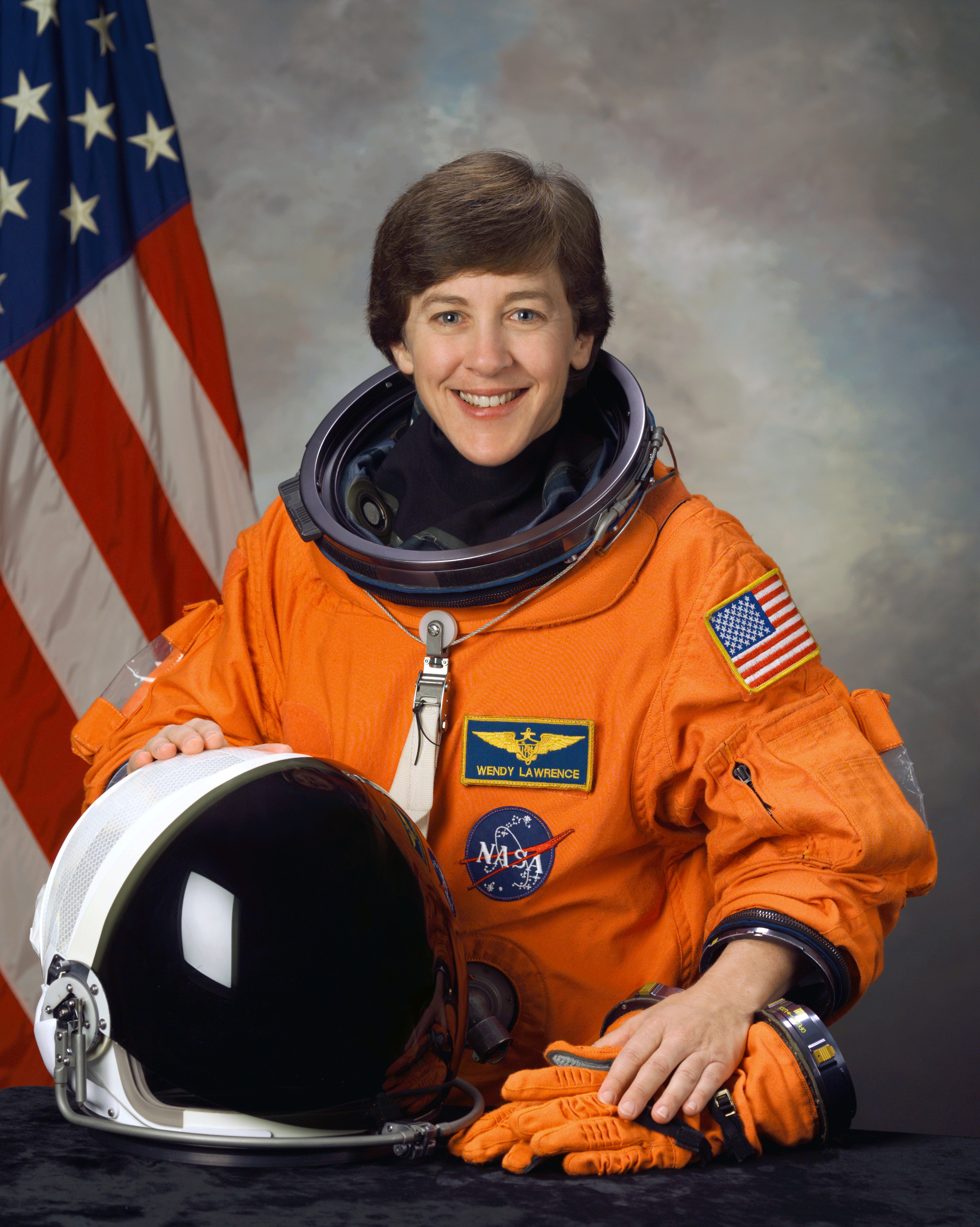
- Born: Wendy Barrien Lawrence; July 2, 1959 (age 67); Jacksonville, Florida, U.S.
- Education: United States Naval Academy (BS); Massachusetts Institute of Technology (MS)
- Relatives: William P. Lawrence (father); Fatty Lawrence (grandfather)
- Space career

NASA astronaut
- Rank: Captain, USN (ret.)
- Time in space: 51d 3h 56m
- Selection: NASA Group 14 (1992)
- Missions: STS-67; STS-86; STS-91; STS-114

Wendy Barrien Lawrence (born July 2, 1959) is a retired United States Navy Captain, an engineer, and former helicopter pilot and NASA astronaut. She was the first female graduate of the United States Naval Academy to fly into space and she has also visited the Russian Space Station Mir. She was a mission specialist on STS-114, the first Space Shuttle flight after the Space Shuttle Columbia disaster. She is married to Cathy Watson, a former NASA scientist.

== Early life ==
Lawrence was born in Jacksonville, Florida. She is the daughter and the granddaughter of naval aviators; her grandfather was noted student-athlete Fatty Lawrence and her father was the late Vice Admiral William P. Lawrence, a Project Mercury astronaut finalist and a former Vietnam prisoner of war who was Superintendent of the U.S. Naval Academy and the namesake of the destroyer USS William P. Lawrence (DDG-110).

== Education ==
Lawrence graduated from Fort Hunt High School in Alexandria, Virginia in 1977. She went on to attend the U.S. Naval Academy, graduating in 1981 with a Bachelor of Science in ocean engineering. She later earned a Master of Science in ocean engineering from the Massachusetts Institute of Technology and the Woods Hole Oceanographic Institution in 1988, as part of a joint program between the two schools.

== Organizations ==
- Lawrence Heights Middle School
- Phi Kappa Phi
- Association of Naval Aviation
- Women Military Aviators
- Naval Helicopter Association
- The Mars Generation

== Military career ==
Lawrence graduated from the U.S. Naval Academy in 1981. A distinguished flight school graduate, she was designated as a Naval Aviator in July 1982. Lawrence has more than 1,500 hours of flight time in six different types of helicopters and has made more than 800 shipboard landings. While assigned to Helicopter Combat Support Squadron 6 (HC-6), she was one of the first two female helicopter pilots to make a long deployment to the Indian Ocean as part of a carrier battle group. After completion of a master's degree program at MIT and Woods Hole in 1988, she was assigned to Helicopter Anti-Submarine Squadron Light 30 (HSL-30) as Officer-in-charge of Detachment Alpha. In October 1990, Lawrence reported to the U.S. Naval Academy where she served as a physics instructor and the novice women's crew coach.

== NASA career ==
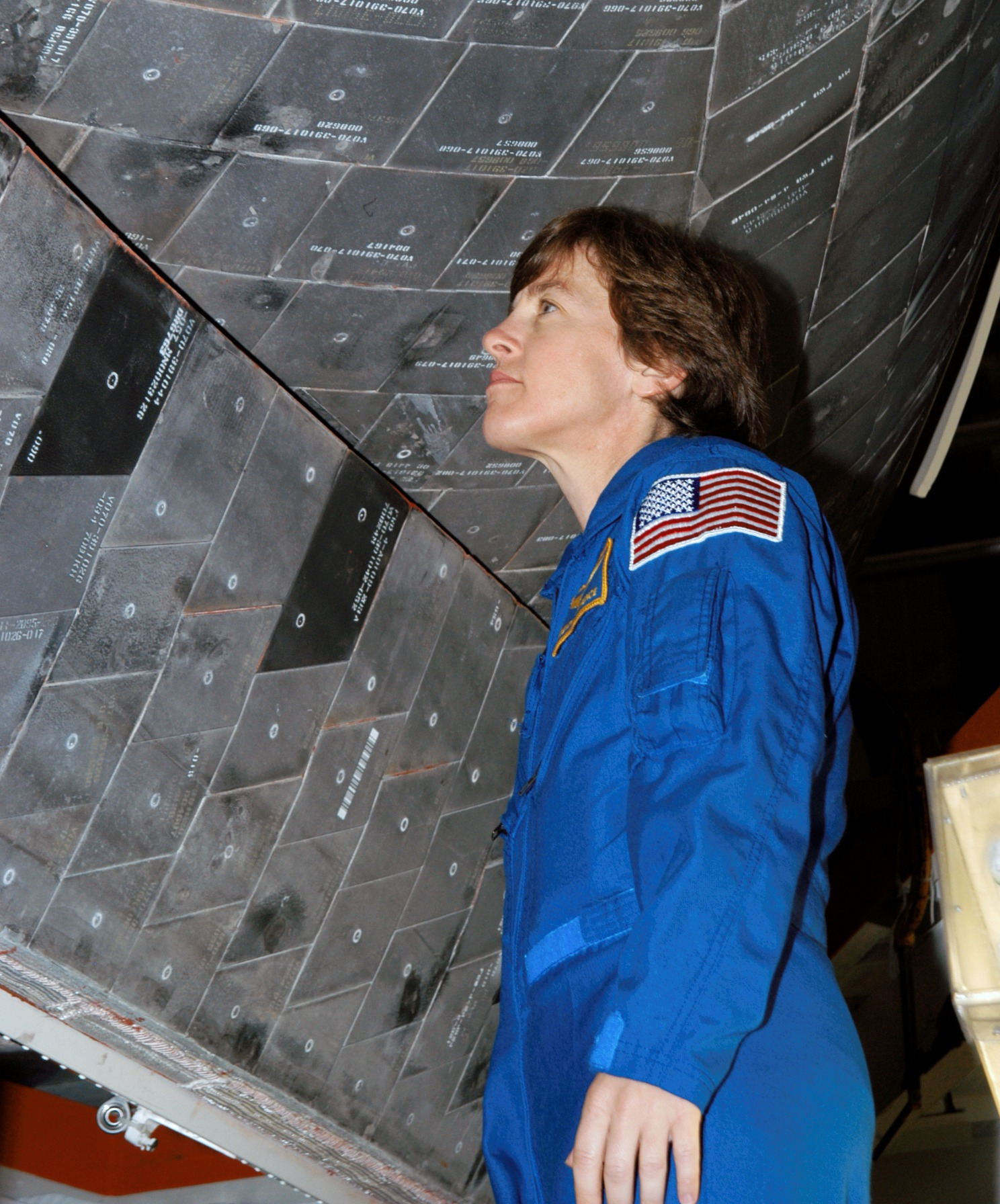
Captain Lawrence inspects Space Shuttle tiles (Oct 2003)

Selected by NASA in March 1992, Lawrence reported to the Johnson Space Center in August 1992. She completed one year of training and was qualified for flight assignment as a mission specialist. Her technical assignments within the Astronaut Office have included flight software verification in the Shuttle Avionics Integration Laboratory (SAIL), Astronaut Office Assistant Training Officer, and Astronaut Office representative for Space Station training and crew support. She flew as the ascent/entry flight engineer and blue shift orbit pilot on STS-67 (March 2–18, 1995). She next served as Director of Operations for NASA at the Gagarin Cosmonaut Training Center in Star City, Russia, with responsibility for the coordination and implementation of mission operations activities in the Moscow region for the joint U.S./Russian Shuttle/Mir program. In September 1996 she began training as a crew member for a 4-month mission on the Russian Space Station Mir. However, she was replaced by David Wolf due to concerns over minimum size requirements for the Russian Orlan EVA suit. Because of her knowledge and experience with Mir systems and with crew transfer logistics for the Mir, she flew on STS-86 (September 25 to October 6, 1997) and STS-91 (June 2–12, 1998). A veteran of four space flights, she logged over 1,200 hours in space. Lawrence was a mission specialist on the crew of STS-114. She was in charge of the transfer of supplies and equipment and operated the Space Station robotic arm on the Return To Flight mission during which the crew tested and evaluated new procedures for the inspection and repair of the Space Shuttle thermal protection system. The mission launched on July 26, 2005, and landed on August 9, 2005. Captain Lawrence retired from NASA in June 2006.

=== Spaceflight experience ===
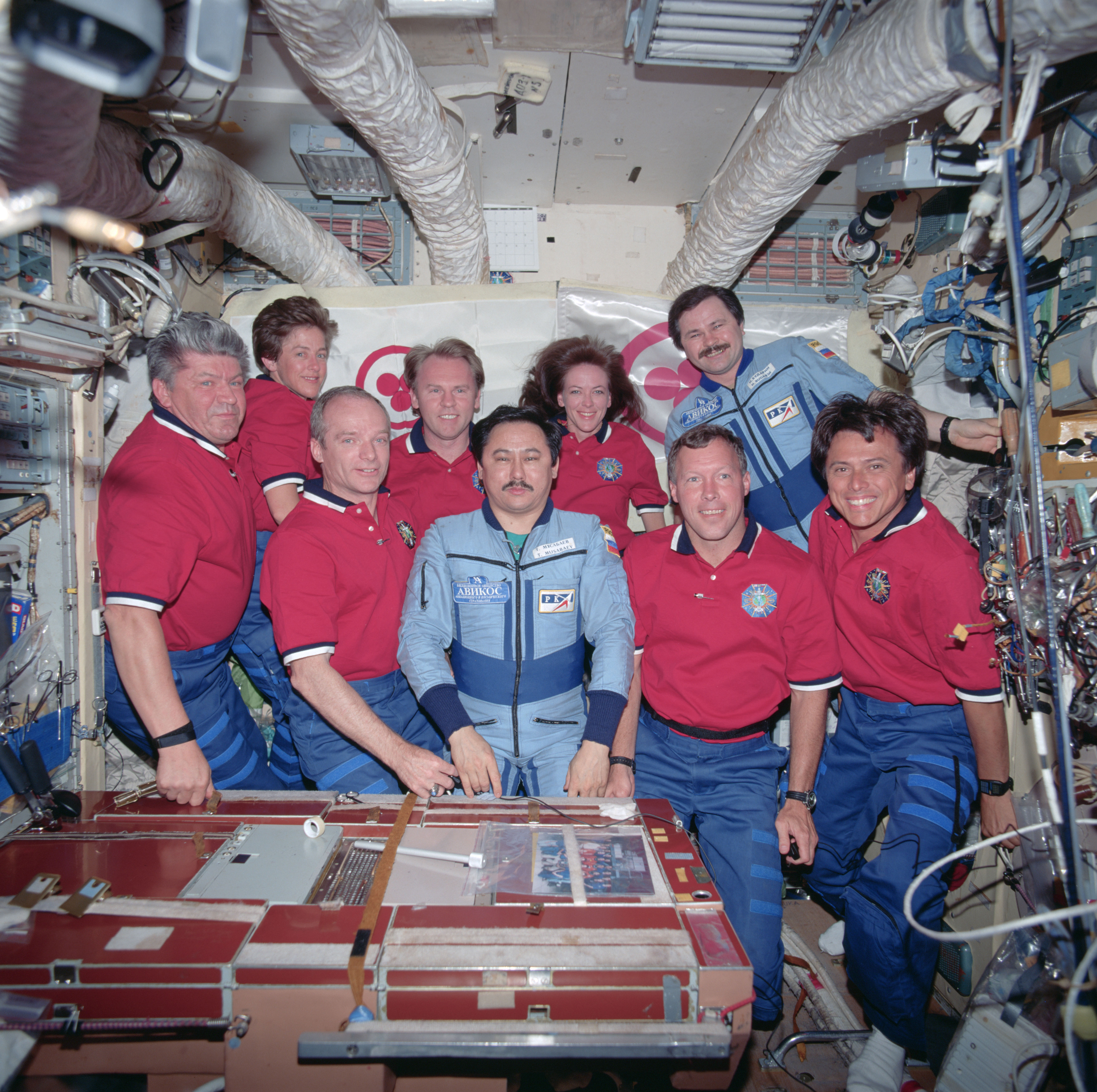
CAPT Lawrence (2nd from left) aboard Russian Space Station Mir (June 1998)

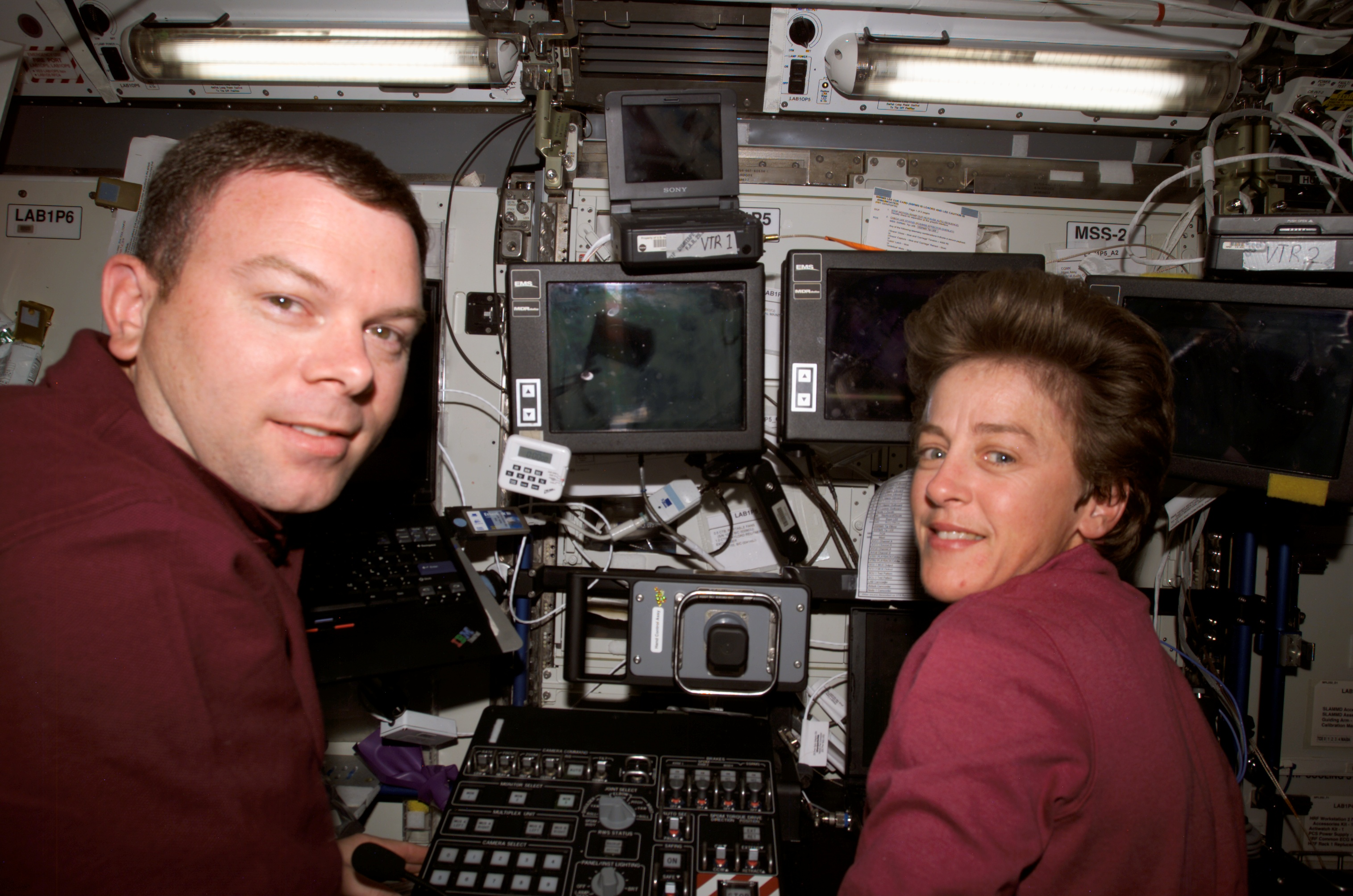
With James Kelly in Destiny during STS-114. (Aug 2005)

STS-67 Endeavour (March 2–18, 1995) was the second flight of the ASTRO observatory, a unique complement of three telescopes. During this 16-day mission, the crew conducted observations around the clock to study the far ultraviolet spectra of faint astronomical objects and the polarization of ultraviolet light coming from hot stars and distant galaxies. Mission duration was 399 hours and 9 minutes.

STS-86 Atlantis (September 25 to October 6, 1997) was the seventh mission to rendezvous and dock with the Russian Space Station Mir. Highlights included the exchange of U.S. crew members Mike Foale and David Wolf, a spacewalk by Scott Parazynski and Vladimir Titov to retrieve four experiments first deployed on Mir during the STS-76 docking mission, the transfer to Mir of 10,400 pounds of science and logistics, and the return of experiment hardware and results to Earth. Mission duration was 169 orbits in 259 hours and 21 minutes.

STS-91 Discovery (June 2–12, 1998) was the 9th and final Shuttle-Mir docking mission and marked the conclusion of the joint U.S./Russian Phase I Program. Mission duration was 235 hours, 54 minutes.

STS-114 Discovery (July 26 – August 9, 2005) was the first "Return to Flight" mission following the Space Shuttle Columbia disaster. Highlights included the first in-flight repair to the orbiter during a spacewalk. Mission duration was 333 hours, 33 minutes. Additionally, shuttle inspection procedures and repair techniques were tested, and 11,000 pounds of cargo was transferred to the International Space Station.

== Awards and honors ==
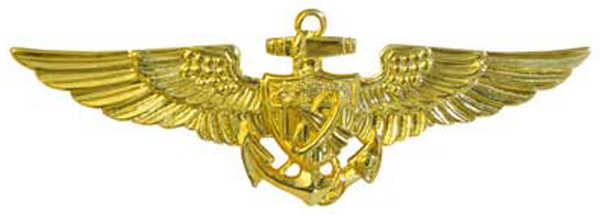

Naval Aviator Astronaut badge
Defense Superior Service Medal with cluster
Legion of Merit	Defense Meritorious Service Medal with two clusters	Meritorious Service Medal with star
Achievement Medal with star	NASA Space Flight Medal with three stars	National Defense Service Medal with star
Global War on Terrorism; Service Medal	Sea Service Deployment Ribbon with star	Overseas Service Ribbon
	Winifred Collins Award	

- 2019 U.S. Naval Academy Distinguished Graduate Award (Her father was awarded this distinction in 2000).
