= STS-89 =

1998 American crewed spaceflight to Mir

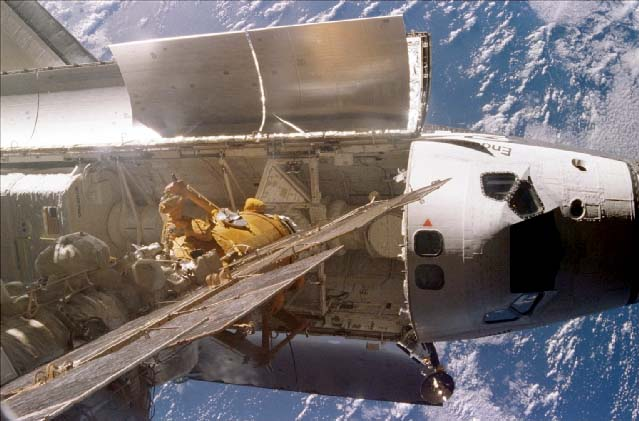
- Endeavour docked to Mir, as viewed from a window on the Kvant-2 module
- Names: Space Transportation System-89
- Mission type: Shuttle-Mir
- Operator: NASA
- COSPAR ID: 1998-003A
- SATCAT no.: 25143
- Mission duration: 8 days, 19 hours, 48 minutes, 4 seconds
- Distance travelled: 5,800,000 kilometers (3,600,000 mi)

Spacecraft properties
- Spacecraft: Space Shuttle Endeavour
- Landing mass: 114,131 kilograms (251,616 lb)
- Payload mass: 7,748 kilograms (17,081 lb)

Crew
- Crew size: 7
- Members: Terrence W. Wilcutt; Joe F. Edwards, Jr.; James F. Reilly, II; Michael P. Anderson; Bonnie J. Dunbar; Salizhan Sharipov
- Launching: Andrew S. W. Thomas
- Landing: David A. Wolf

Start of mission
- Launch date: 23 January 1998, 02:48:15 UTC
- Launch site: Kennedy, LC-39A

End of mission
- Landing date: 31 January 1998, 22:36 UTC
- Landing site: Kennedy, SLF Runway 15

Orbital parameters
- Reference system: Geocentric
- Regime: Low Earth
- Perigee altitude: 359 kilometres (223 mi)
- Apogee altitude: 382 kilometres (237 mi)
- Inclination: 51.60 degrees
- Period: 92.0 min

Docking with Mir
- Docking port: SO starboard
- Docking date: 24 January 1998, 20:14:15 UTC
- Undocking date: 29 January 1998, 16:56 UTC
- Time docked: 4 days, 20 hours, 41 minutes 45 seconds
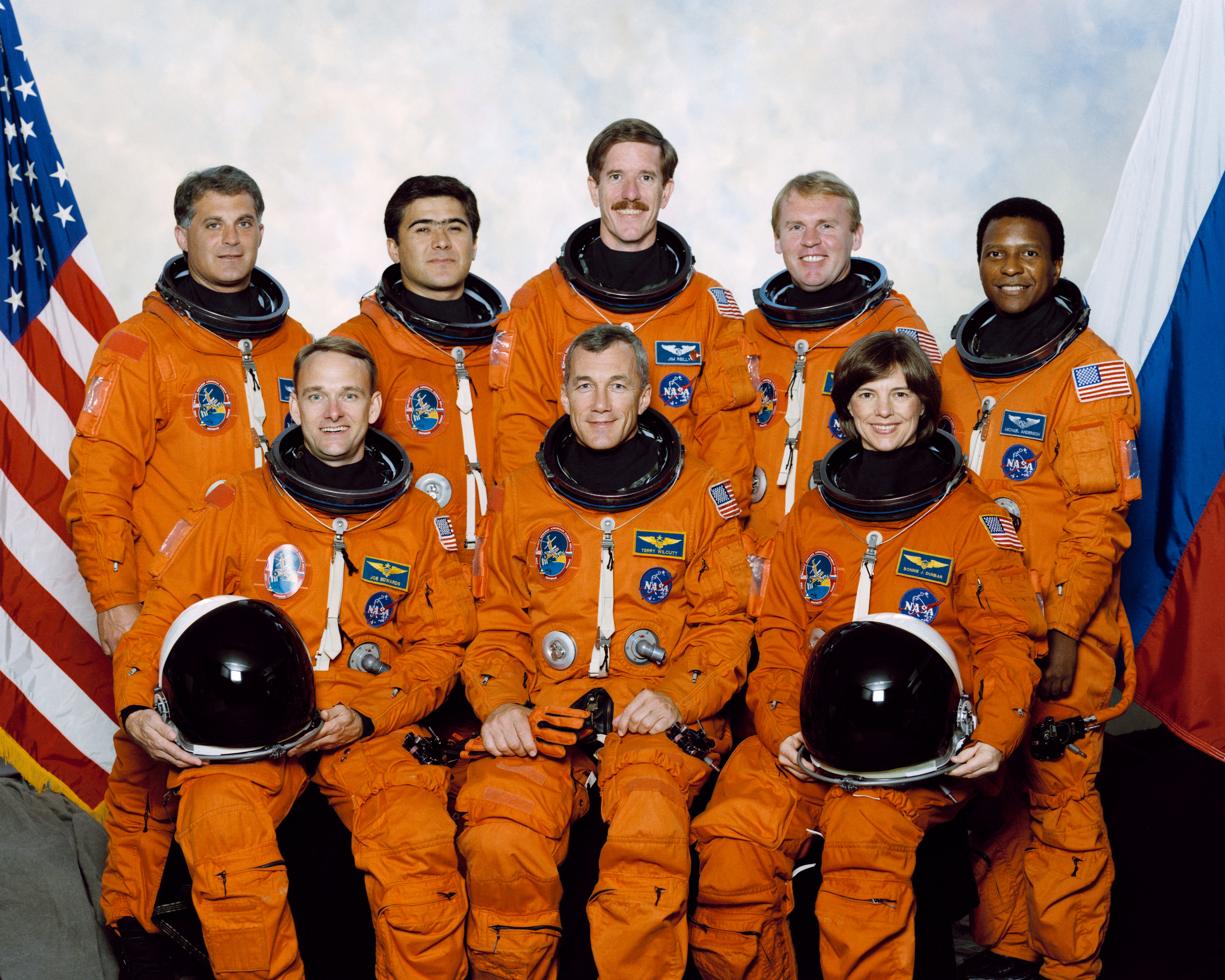
- Left to right - Back row: Wolf, Sharipov, Reilly, Thomas, Anderson; Front row: Edwards, Wilcutt, Dunbar Space Shuttle program

STS-89 was a Space Shuttle mission to the Mir space station flown by Space Shuttle Endeavour, and launched from Kennedy Space Center, Florida on 22 January 1998.

== Crew ==
Position	Launching Astronaut	Landing Astronaut
Commander	(United States) Terrence W. Wilcutt; Third spaceflight	
Pilot	(United States) Joe F. Edwards, Jr. Only spaceflight	
Mission Specialist 1	(United States) James F. Reilly, II; First spaceflight	
Mission Specialist 2 Flight Engineer	(United States) Michael P. Anderson; First spaceflight	
Mission Specialist 3	(United States) Bonnie J. Dunbar; Fifth and last spaceflight	
Mission Specialist 4	(Russia) Salizhan Sharipov, RKA; First spaceflight	
Mission Specialist 5	(Australia) / (United States) Andrew S. W. Thomas; EO-24; Second spaceflight	(United States) David A. Wolf; EO-24; Second spaceflight

=== Crew notes ===
STS-89 was originally scheduled to return Wendy B. Lawrence but returned David A. Wolf (Mir 24–25/STS-86) and left Andrew Thomas on Mir. Thomas returned on STS-91.

=== Crew seat assignments ===
Seat	Launch	Landing	Seats 1–4 are on the flight deck. Seats 5–7 are on the mid-deck.
1	Wilcutt		Seats 1–4 are on the flight deck. Seats 5–7 are on the mid-deck.
2	Edwards		Seats 1–4 are on the flight deck. Seats 5–7 are on the mid-deck.
3	Reilly	Dunbar	Seats 1–4 are on the flight deck. Seats 5–7 are on the mid-deck.
4	Anderson		Seats 1–4 are on the flight deck. Seats 5–7 are on the mid-deck.
5	Dunbar	Reilly	Seats 1–4 are on the flight deck. Seats 5–7 are on the mid-deck.
6	Sharipov		Seats 1–4 are on the flight deck. Seats 5–7 are on the mid-deck.
7	Thomas	Wolf	Seats 1–4 are on the flight deck. Seats 5–7 are on the mid-deck.

== Mission highlights ==
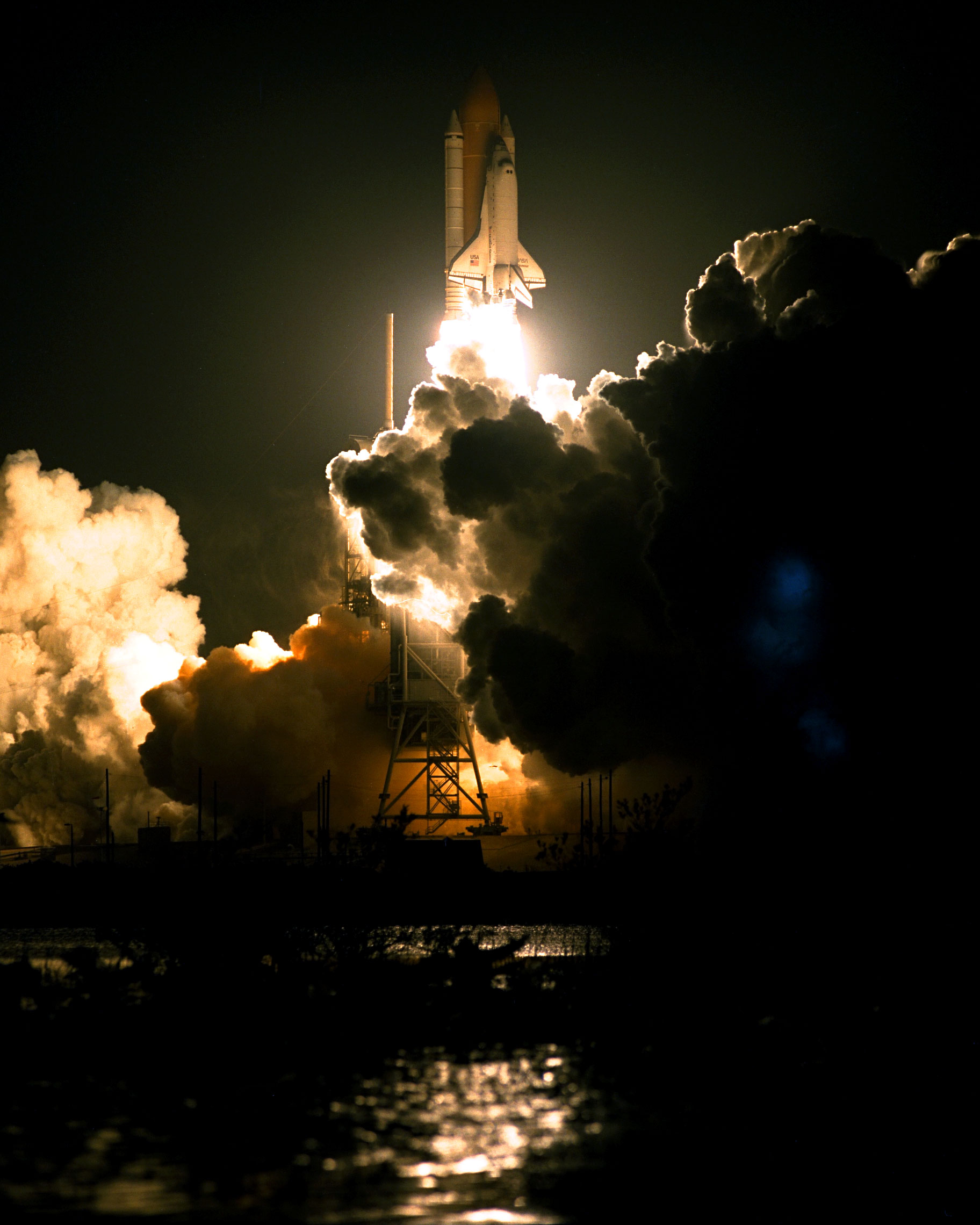
STS-89 launch

STS-89 launched on January 22, 1998 and was the eighth of nine planned missions to Mir and the fifth involving an exchange of U.S. astronauts. Astronaut David Wolf, who had been on Mir since late September 1997, was replaced by Astronaut Andrew Thomas. Thomas spent approximately 4 months on the orbiting Russian facility before returning to Earth when Discovery docked to Mir in late May during STS-91.

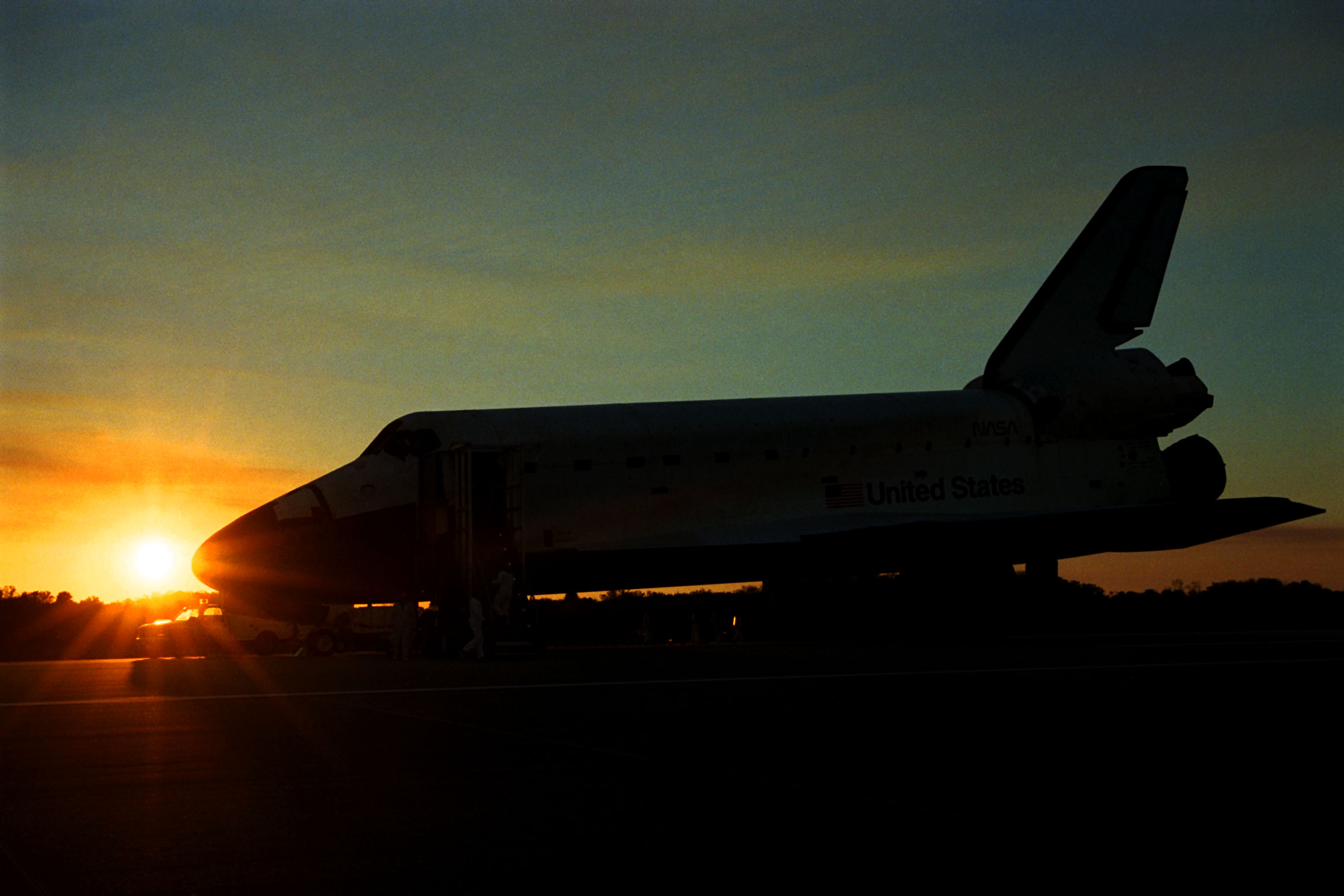
Endeavour lands at Kennedy Space Center, 31 January 1998.

During the mission, more than 3,175 kilograms (7,000 lb) of experiments, supplies and hardware were transferred between the two spacecraft.

== Experiments and payloads ==
SPACEHAB Payloads included the Advanced X-Ray Detector (ADV XDT), Advanced Commercial Generic Bioprocessing Apparatus (ADV CGBA), EORF, Mechanics of Granular Materials (MGM) Experiment, Intra-Vehicular Radiation Environment Measurements by the Real-Time Radiation Monitor (RME-1312), Space Acceleration Measurement System (SAMS), VOA and the Volatile Removal Assembly prototype for the ISS Water Recovery System.

In-cabin payloads included the Microgravity Plant Nutrient Experiment (MPNE), Shuttle Ionospheric Modification with Pulsed Local Exhaust (SIMPLEX), Closed Equilibrated Biological Aquatic System (CEBAS), TeleMedicine Instrumentation Pack (TMIP), Global Positioning System Development Test Objective (GPS DTO), Human Performance (HP) Experiment, MSD, EarthKAM, Orbiter Space Vision System (OSVS) Shuttle Condensate Collection (RME-1331), Thermo-Electric Holding Module (TEHM), Space Linear Acceleration Mass Measurement Device (DSO 914), Co-Culture Experiments (CoCult) and the Biochemistry of 3-D Tissue Engineering (BIO3D).

Getaway Special experiments included the University of Michigan G-093 – Vortex Ring Transit Experiment (VORTEX), the German Aerospace Center and University Giessen G-141 – Structure of Marangoni Convection in Floating Zones Payload, the German Aerospace Center and the Technical University of Clausthal G-145 Glass Fining Experiment and the Chinese Academy of Sciences G-432 canister containing 5 crystal growth and material sciences experiments.

== Coelophysis bone ==
Additionally, the skull of a Coelophysis was brought onboard the Mir during this mission. It became the second dinosaur fossil brought into space (the first being fossilized eggshells and bones from Maiasaura in 1985, during the mission STS-51-F).

== Mission insignia ==
The insignia depicts Endeavour docked to Mir above the planet Earth. The white inside line in the shape of the number eight and the nine stars symbolize the flight's numerical designation in the Space Transportation System's mission sequence. The International Space Station is in the background.

== See also ==
- List of human spaceflights
- List of Space Shuttle missions
- Outline of space science
