= Michael Foale =

British-American astrophysicist and astronaut (born 1957)

Michael Foale CBE
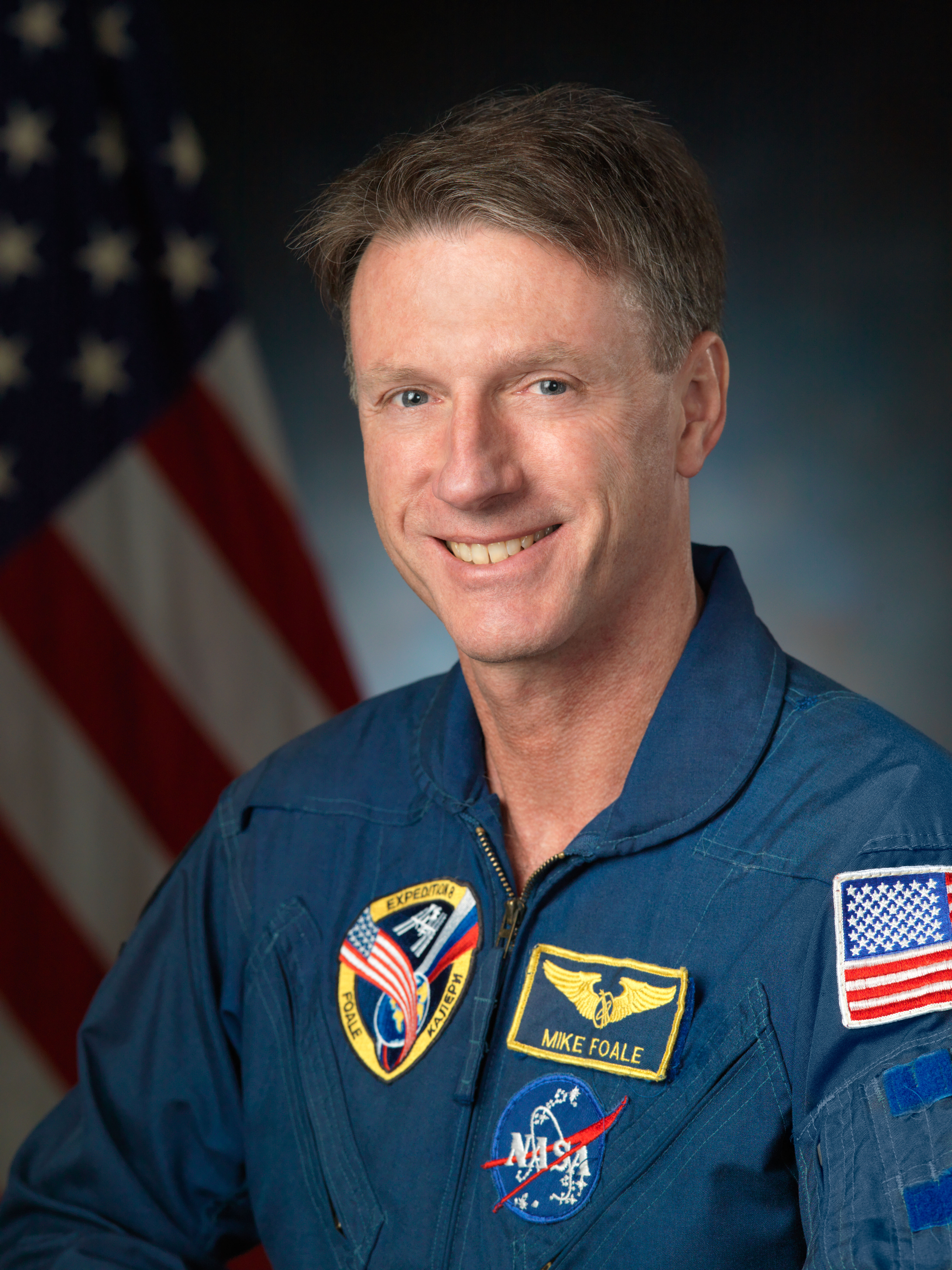
- Born: Colin Michael Foale; 6 January 1957 (age 69); Louth, UK
- Education: Queens' College, Cambridge (BA, PhD)
- Awards: Commander of the Order of the British Empire
- Space career

NASA astronaut
- Time in space: 374d 11h 19m
- Selection: NASA Group 12 (1987)
- Total EVAs: 4
- Total EVA time: 16h 44m
- Missions: STS-45; STS-56; STS-63; STS-84/STS-86 (Mir NASA-5) (Mir EO-23 and 24); STS-103; Soyuz TMA-3 (Expedition 8)
- Retired: August 9, 2013

Colin Michael Foale CBE (/foʊl/; born 6 January 1957) is a British-American astrophysicist and a former NASA astronaut. He is a veteran of six space missions, and he is the only NASA astronaut to have flown extended missions aboard both Mir and the International Space Station. He was the second Briton in space and the first to perform a space walk. Until 17 April 2008, he held the record for most time spent in space by a US citizen: 374 days, 11 hours, 19 minutes, and as of 2024 he held the cumulative-time-in-space record for a British citizen.

== Life and career ==
Foale was born in Louth, Lincolnshire, to a British father, Colin, and an American mother, Mary. His father was an RAF officer who retired with the rank of Air Commodore. Foale was raised in Cambridge and educated at The King's School, Canterbury. A member of the Air Training Corps, he studied at Queens' College, Cambridge receiving a first-class honours BA degree in natural sciences in 1978 (later promoted to a Cambridge MA degree), and subsequently a PhD degree in laboratory astrophysics in 1982, where his supervisor was Alan Cook. When he left university, he "owned two pairs of jeans, a donkey jacket, a bicycle and a pilot's licence; which shows I had my priorities absolutely right".

While a postgraduate student at Cambridge University, he participated in the organisation and execution of scientific scuba diving projects. Pursuing a career in the US Space Program, he moved to Houston, Texas to work on Space Shuttle navigation problems for McDonnell Douglas. In June 1983, Foale joined the NASA Johnson Space Center in the payload operations area of the Mission Operations Directorate. In his capacity as payload officer in the Mission Control Center, he was responsible for payload operations on Space Shuttle missions STS-51G, 51-I, 61-B and 61-C.

Born in the United Kingdom, Foale applied and was turned down twice as an astronaut candidate. After the Space Shuttle Challenger disaster in January 1986, Foale changed his application essay from writing about his dreams to focusing on the realities of leadership faced by NASA, and was selected in 1987.

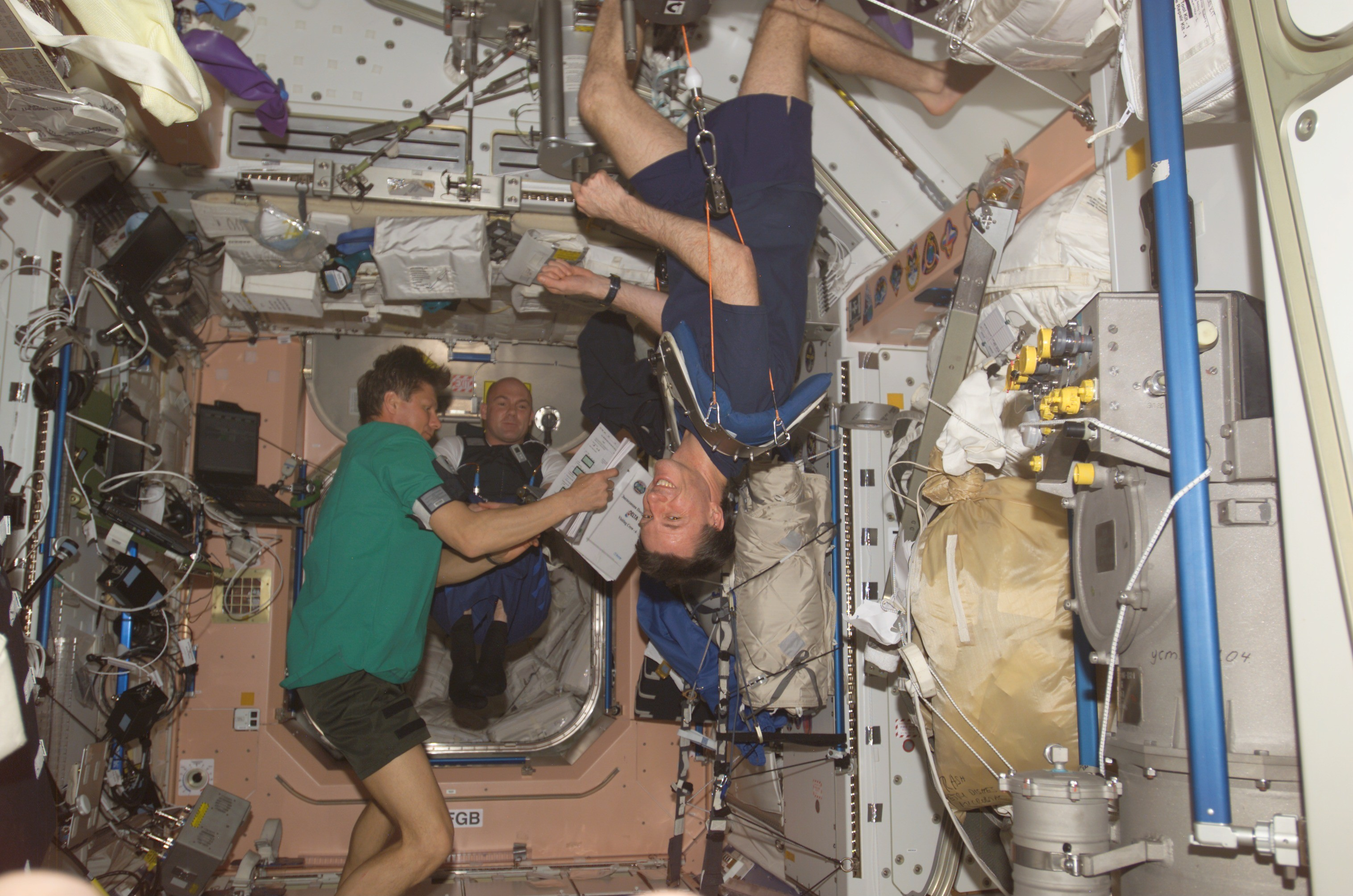
Michael Foale (foreground) exercising on the ISS

He flew on Space Shuttle missions STS-45 (1992), STS-56 (1993) and STS-63 (1995). In the last mission, he undertook a four-hour EVA. He was then selected for an extended mission aboard the Russian Mir space station.

Launched by STS-84 and returned by STS-86, Foale spent four months on Mir in 1997 during the Mir 23 and Mir 24 missions. During Mir 23, the station's Spektr module was struck by a Progress resupply vessel. Using knowledge from his physics degree, Foale made calculations of how the stars were moving past his fixed-point thumb reference on a window, and was thus able to advise Russian ground control of how to stop the resulting roll. The two Russian cosmonauts of Mir 23, Vasily Tsibliyev and Aleksandr Lazutkin were planned to conduct an intravehicular activity (IVA) to inspect the collision damage from the interior of the space station, but this IVA was actually carried out by Mir EO-24 crew. After the Mir EO-24 crew exchange, Soyuz TM-26 with all three crew aboard was undocked, repositioned and re-docked. Foale acted as photographer during the operation. Foale and Russian cosmonaut Anatoly Solovyev also conducted a six-hour EVA in Russian Orlan spacesuits to inspect exterior damage to the Spektr module. Station damage produced significant risk to EVA suit integrity. For his efforts, he was awarded the Yuri A. Gagarin Gold Medal by the Fédération Aéronautique Internationale. Subsequently, Mir's primary and backup oxygen generation systems failed, but these were successfully repaired by the crew. The station also experienced computer failures and problems orientating the solar arrays at the correct angle to the Sun. All these difficulties combined to produce what, looking back 20 years later, was arguably, the most dangerous long-duration mission for a NASA astronaut. The problems encountered by Foale and his predecessor aboard Mir, Jerry Linenger, resulted in intense political pressure on NASA. The final decision between the termination of NASA crewing of Mir with Foale's departure, or his scheduled replacement by David Wolf was only made by NASA Administrator Daniel Goldin the night before the launch of STS-86.

In 1999, Foale was a member of Space Shuttle mission STS-103, during which he conducted an eight-hour spacewalk to replace components of the Hubble Space Telescope. In 2003, Foale was named commander of International Space Station Expedition 8 with cosmonaut Aleksandr Kaleri. During their six-month tour of duty on the station, Foale and Kaleri carried out a 4-hour Russian EVA in Orlan-M space suits to install experiments outside the Service Module. The EVA was cut short when significant amounts of water in Kaleri's helmet prevented further work. Expedition 8 ended on 29 April 2004. For about a year, Foale was Deputy Associate Administrator for Exploration Operations at NASA HQ, Washington D.C. He then supported Soyuz and ISS operations and spacesuit development for NASA in Houston.

In August 2013, it was announced that Foale was leaving the agency after a 26-year career to work on developing an electric aircraft to advance green aviation technology. Since leaving NASA, Foale has become actively involved in the running of the International Space Schools Education Trust, especially their Mission Discovery and trips to Star City, Russia, giving unique experiences to students around the world. Mission Discovery is held each year at the Guy's Campus at King's College London.

== Honours ==
Foale was awarded an honorary degree by the University of Lincolnshire and Humberside in July 2000 and an honorary Doctor of Science degree by the University of Kent in September 2000. He was invested as a Commander of the Order of the British Empire in the diplomatic list of the New Year Honours in December 2004.

It is possible he has been patron to a pastoral house at the Folkestone Academy in Kent, which is also named after him. A street in Foale's birth town was named Michael Foale Lane.

Foale and Ellen Ochoa were announced as the 2017 class of the United States Astronaut Hall of Fame.

== Personal life ==
Married with two children, Foale and his family live in Seabrook, Texas. He is fluent in Russian. Foale is qualified to fly fixed-wing aeroplanes, gliders, and helicopters. He has never owned a brand-new car, though he has always wanted one, and his hobbies include windsurfing, gliding, and cross-country skiing.

Foale was the driver of a car in 1980 in Yugoslavia, when a truck accidentally veered across the road and smashed into his car, killing his girlfriend and his brother. His father, Colin Foale, wrote a book in 1999 titled Waystation to the Stars about the astronaut's experiences on Mir.

In his spare time, he has also worked with the International Space School Educational Trust (ISSET). This involvement is through him taking up the role of the resident astronaut during many of the Mission Discovery programmes operated by ISSET, when Foale shares his experiences of being in space with teenagers, while at the same time helping them to learn new skills. He does this throughout the period of the time the programme runs.
