= Expedition 8 =

Long-duration mission to the International Space Station

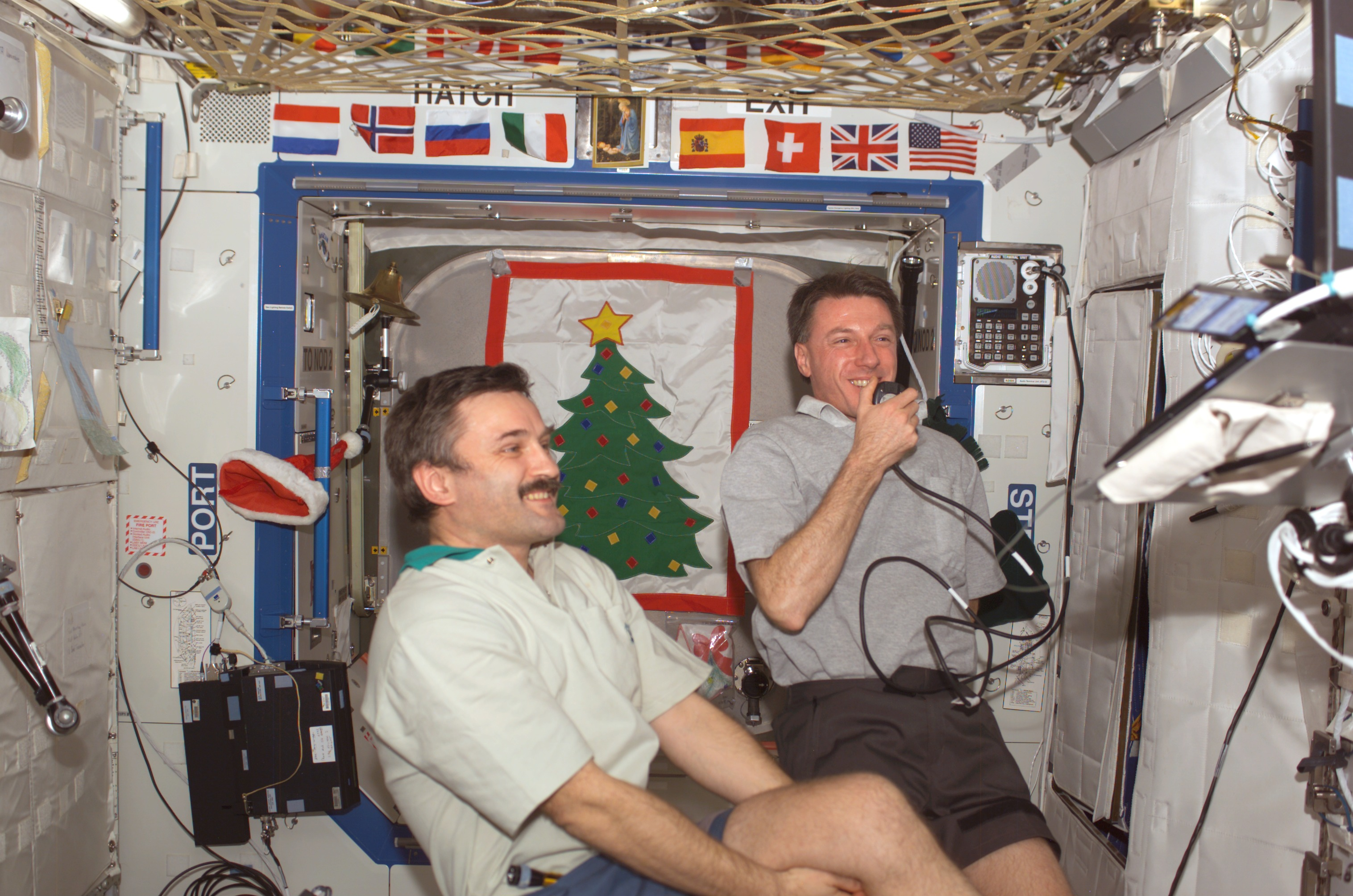
- Foale and Kaleri conduct a teleconference with Moscow as part of the Russian New Year celebration.
- Mission type: Long-duration expedition
- Mission duration: 192 days, 13 hours, 36 minutes and 11 seconds (at ISS); 194 days, 18 hours, 33 minutes, 12 seconds (launch to landing)
- Distance travelled: ~129,123,519 kilometres (80,233,635 mi)
- Orbits completed: ~3,036

Expedition
- Space station: International Space Station
- Began: 20 October 2003, 07:15:58 UTC
- Ended: 29 April 2004, 20:52:09 UTC
- Arrived aboard: Soyuz TMA-3
- Departed aboard: Soyuz TMA-3

Crew
- Crew size: 2
- Members: Michael Foale; Aleksandr Kaleri
- EVAs: 1
- EVA duration: 3 hours 55 minutes
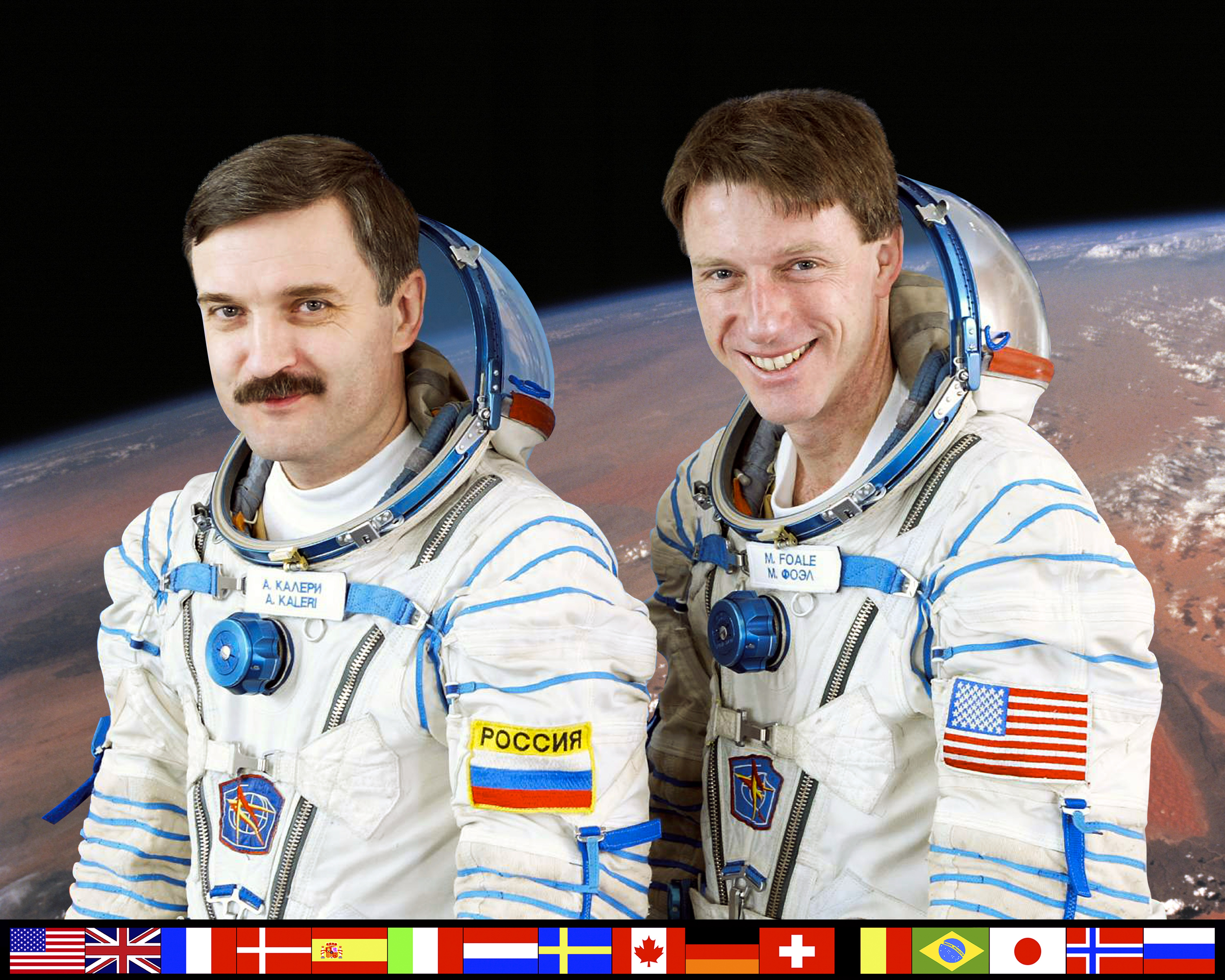
- Expedition 8 mission patch L-R: Alexandr Kaleri and Michael Foale ISS expeditions

Expedition 8 was the eighth expedition to the International Space Station.

== Crew ==
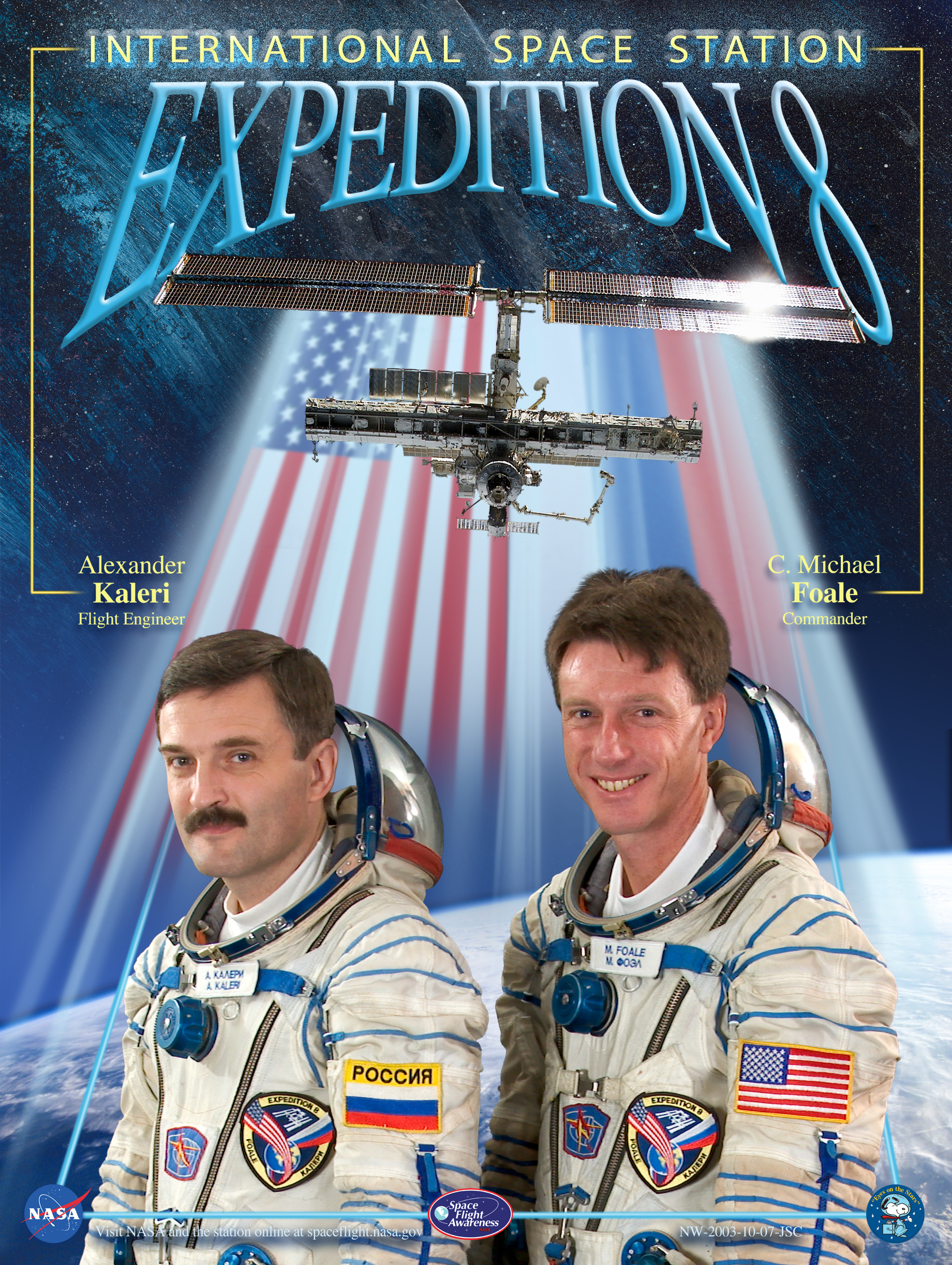
Expedition 8 promotional poster

Prime crew
Position	Crew
Commander	Michael Foale, NASA; Sixth and last spaceflight
Flight Engineer	Aleksandr Kaleri, RSA; Fourth spaceflight

Backup crew
Position	Crew
Commander	William McArthur, NASA
Flight Engineer	Valeri Tokarev, RSA

=== Planned crew before Columbia disaster ===
Position	Crew
Commander	Michael Foale, NASA
Flight Engineer	William McArthur, NASA
Flight Engineer	Valery Tokarev, RSA

== Mission parameters ==
- Perigee: 384 km
- Apogee: 396 km
- Inclination: 51.6°
- Period: 92 min
- Docked: 20 October 2003 – 07:15:58 UTC
- Undocked: 29 April 2004 – 20:52:09 UTC
- Time Docked: 192 days, 13 h, 36 min, 11 s

== Mission objectives ==
Expedition 8 commander and NASA station science officer Michael Foale, flight engineer Alexander Kaleri, and ESA astronaut Pedro Duque docked the Soyuz TMA-3 with the International Space Station at 07:15:58 UTC on 20 October 2003. At the time of docking, both spacecraft orbited the Earth above Russia.

Once the Expedition 7 crew undocked, Foale and Kaleri settled down to work, beginning a more than six-month stint focused on Station operations and maintenance.

The new station crew, along with Duque, launched from the Baikonur Cosmodrome in Kazakhstan at 05:38:03 UTC, on 18 October 2003.

Foale and Kaleri departed the station for earth aboard the Soyuz TMA-3 spacecraft on 29 April 2004 along with ESA Astronaut André Kuipers, who had arrived with the Expedition 9 crew aboard Soyuz TMA-4 nine days earlier.

== Spacewalks ==
The Expedition 8 crew conducted the first two-person spacewalk at the International Space Station. Unlike previous spacewalks conducted by ISS crews, there was not a crewmember inside the Station as the spacewalkers worked outside. The spacewalk was based out of the Pirs docking compartment; the spacewalkers wore Russian Orlan space suits.

This was the 52nd spacewalk devoted to Space Station assembly, operations and maintenance, bringing the cumulative total to 322 hours and 32 minutes. It was the 27th based out of the Station, bringing the total to 155 hours and 17 minutes.

Mission	Spacewalkers	Start (UTC)	End (UTC)	Duration
Expedition 8 EVA 1	Michael Foale; Alexander Kaleri	26 February 2004; 21:17	27 February 2004; 01:12	3 hours, 55 minutes
Expedition 8 EVA 1	This spacewalk was cut short due a cooling system malfunction in Kaleri's spacesuit. Although the spacewalk ended early, Foale and Kaleri were able to complete a number of their tasks. The first task was the replacement of cassette containers that hold sample materials for an experiment studying the effect of long-duration exposure to the microgravity environment. Later, Foale replaced two similar cassettes housed on the outside of the Zvezda Service Module. A Russian experiment named Matryoshka was attached to the outer hull of Zvezda which will provide data on radiation exposure to the human body during space flight. The spacewalkers also removed one of the suitcase-sized devices associated with the Japanese Aerospace Exploration Agency's MPAC-SEEDS experiment. They relocated a second device. This experiment was studying micro-meteor impacts and material exposure in the space environment. This experiment was installed on the ISS by Expedition 3 spacewalkers 15 October 2001. The crew was not able to complete the removal of laser light retroreflector devices from the aft end of Zvezda. The reflectors were being studied as navigation devices for the European Space Agency's Automated Transfer Vehicle, which first flew to the ISS in 2008. Another task not included was work on a materials science experiment called Kromka. This experiment measured the amount of residue emitted from Zvezda's jet thruster firings.			

== Images ==
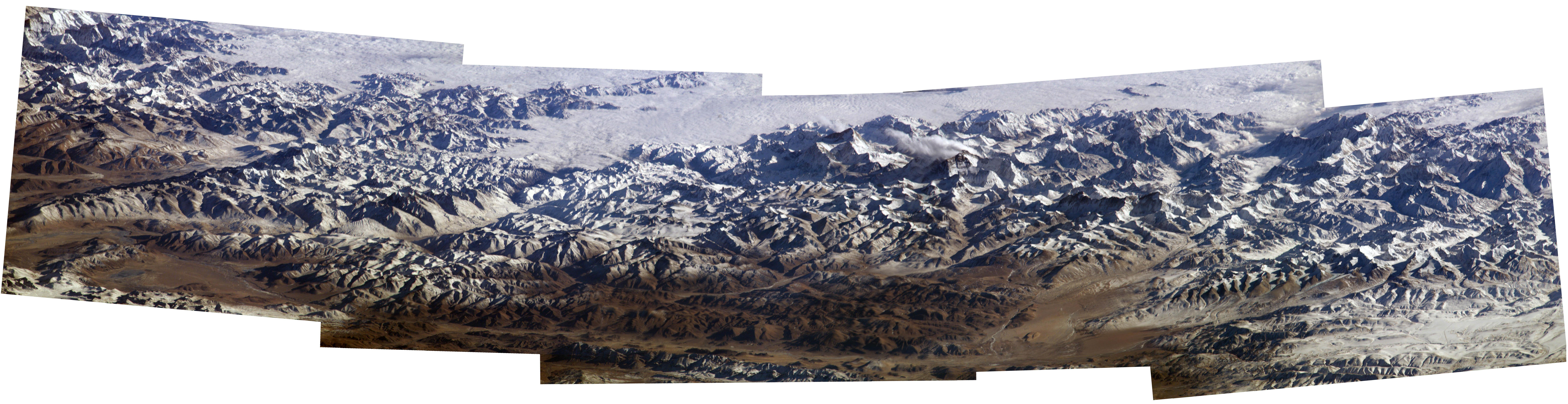
2004 photo mosaic the Himalayas with Makalu and Mount Everest from the International Space Station, Expedition 8.
