= Mir EO-24 =

Twenty-fourth expedition to Mir space station

- Mission type: Mir expedition
- Distance travelled: ~126,000,000 kilometres (78,000,000 mi)
- Orbits completed: 3,128

Expedition
- Space station: Mir
- Began: 5 August 1997
- Ended: 19 February 1998
- Arrived aboard: Soyuz TM-26; Foale: STS-84; Space Shuttle Atlantis; Wolf: STS-86; Space Shuttle Atlantis; Thomas: STS-89; Space Shuttle Endeavour
- Departed aboard: Soyuz TM-26; Foale: STS-86; Space Shuttle Atlantis; Wolf: STS-89; Space Shuttle Endeavour; Thomas: STS-91; Space Shuttle Discovery

Crew
- Crew size: 3
- Members: Anatoly Solovyev; Pavel Vinogradov; Colin Michael Foale* (August-September); David Wolf (September-January); Andy Thomas† (January-February) * - transferred from EO-23 † - transferred to EO-25
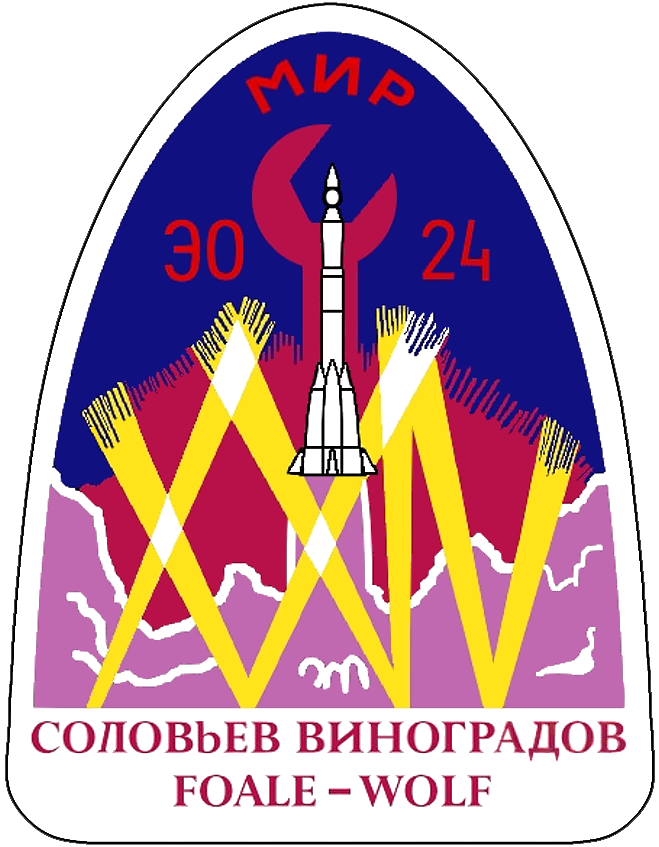
- Long-term Mir expeditions

Mir EO-24 was the 24th long-duration mission to Russia's Mir space station.

== Crew ==
This mission was part of the Shuttle–Mir Program, in which three American astronauts flew aboard the station during Mir EO-24.

Position	First Part (August 1997 to September 1997)	Second Part (September 1997 to January, 1998)	Third Part (January, 1998 to February, 1998)
Commander	(Russia) Anatoly Solovyev; Fifth and last spaceflight		
Flight Engineer 1	(Russia) Pavel Vinogradov; First spaceflight		
Flight Engineer 2	(United Kingdom) / (United States) Michael Foale; Fourth spaceflight Launched during Mir EO-23	(United States) David Wolf; Third spaceflight	(Australia) / (United States) Andy Thomas; Second spaceflight

Note: (France) Léopold Eyharts joined the Soyuz TM-26 crew on the way home from Mir, after launching with Soyuz TM-27 crewmembers Talgat Musabayev and Nikolai Budarin at the end of Mir EO-24. Foale arrived aboard Mir during the EO-23 mission, and was transferred to the EO-24 crew when the expeditions changed. Thomas remained aboard Mir as part of the EO-25 crew after the end of EO-24.

== See also ==
- 1997 in spaceflight
