= STS-86 =

1997 American crewed spaceflight to Mir

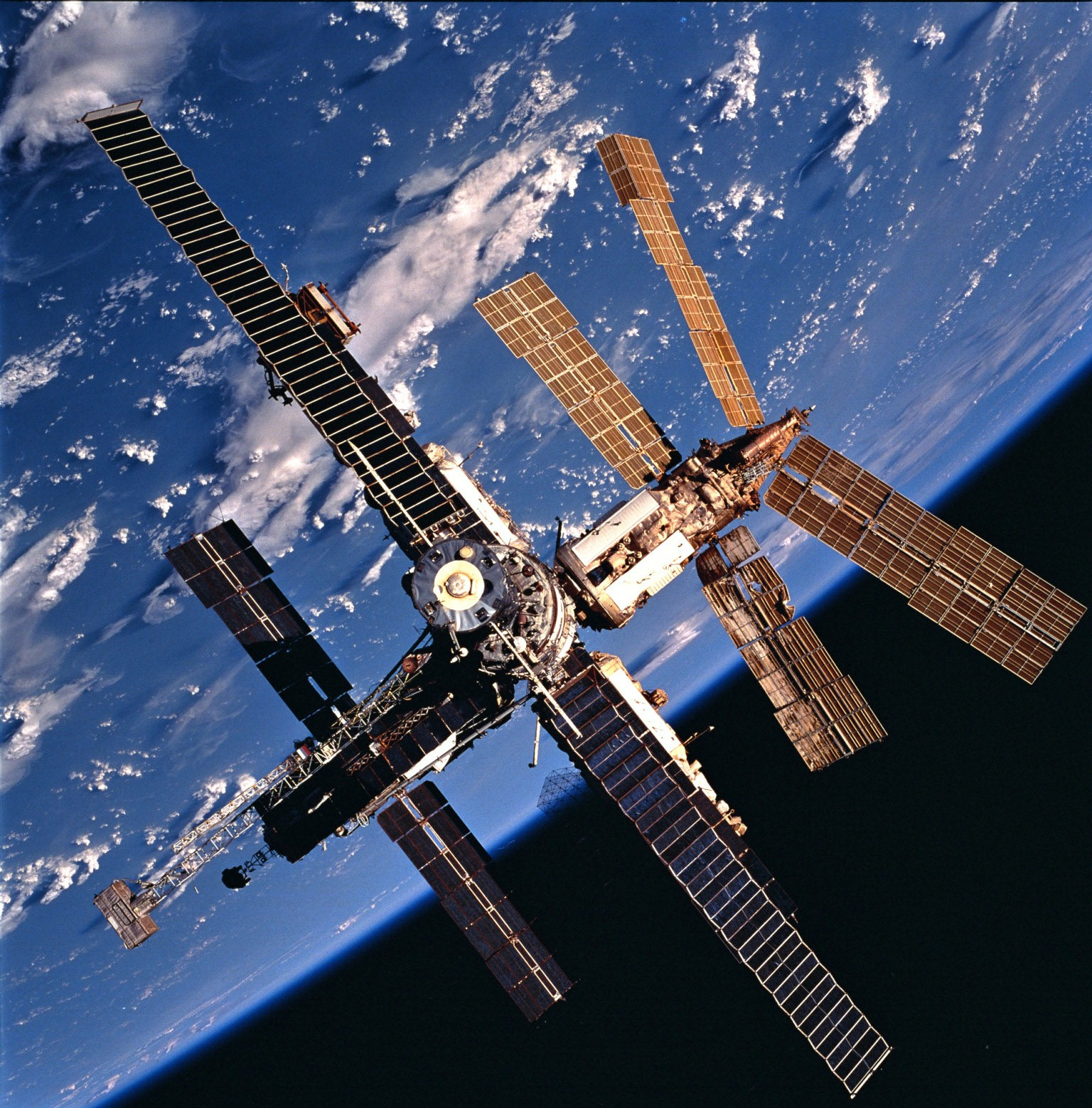
- View of Mir from Atlantis, with damage to one of Spektr's solar arrays visible
- Names: Space Transportation System-86
- Mission type: Shuttle-Mir
- Operator: NASA
- COSPAR ID: 1997-055A
- SATCAT no.: 24964
- Mission duration: 10 days, 19 hours, 22 minutes, 12 seconds
- Distance travelled: 7,000,000 kilometres (4,300,000 mi)
- Orbits completed: 170

Spacecraft properties
- Spacecraft: Space Shuttle Atlantis
- Landing mass: 114,185 kilograms (251,735 lb)
- Payload mass: 8,375 kilograms (18,464 lb)

Crew
- Crew size: 7
- Members: James D. Wetherbee; Michael J. Bloomfield; Vladimir G. Titov; Scott E. Parazynski; Jean-Loup Chrétien; Wendy B. Lawrence
- Launching: David A. Wolf
- Landing: C. Michael Foale

Start of mission
- Launch date: 26 September 1997, 02:34:19 UTC
- Launch site: Kennedy, LC-39A

End of mission
- Landing date: 6 October 1997, 21:55 UTC
- Landing site: Kennedy, SLF Runway 15

Orbital parameters
- Reference system: Geocentric
- Regime: Low Earth
- Perigee altitude: 354 kilometres (220 mi)
- Apogee altitude: 381 kilometres (237 mi)
- Inclination: 51.6 degrees
- Period: 91.9 min

Docking with Mir
- Docking port: SO starboard
- Docking date: 27 September 1997, 19:58 UTC
- Undocking date: 3 October 1997, 17:28:15 UTC
- Time docked: 5 days, 21 hours, 30 minutes 15 seconds
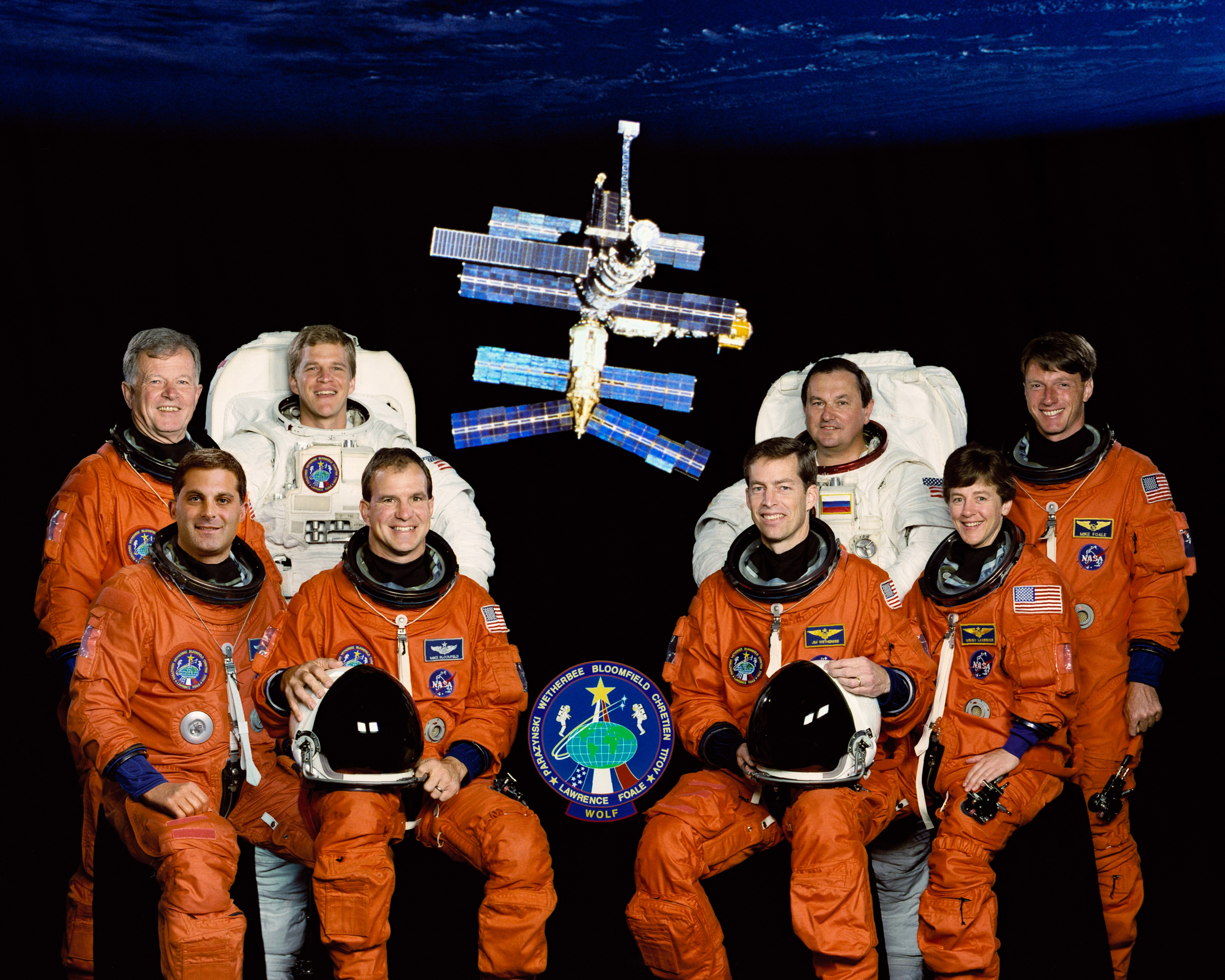
- Left to right – Front row: Wolf, Bloomfield, Wetherbee, Lawrence; Back row: Chrétien, Parazynski, Titov, Foale. An early version of this photograph omitted Wolf. Space Shuttle program

STS-86 was a Space Shuttle Atlantis mission to the Mir space station. This was the last Atlantis mission before it was taken out of service temporarily for maintenance and upgrades, including the glass cockpit.

== Crew ==
Position	Launching Astronaut	Landing Astronaut
Commander	(United States) James D. Wetherbee; Fourth spaceflight	
Pilot	(United States) Michael J. Bloomfield; First spaceflight	
Mission Specialist 1	(Russia) Vladimir G. Titov, RKA; Fourth and last spaceflight	
Mission Specialist 2 Flight Engineer	(United States) Scott E. Parazynski; Second spaceflight	
Mission Specialist 3	(France) Jean-Loup Chrétien, CNES; Third and last spaceflight	
Mission Specialist 4	(United States) Wendy B. Lawrence; Second spaceflight	
Mission Specialist 5	(United States) David A. Wolf; EO-24; Second spaceflight	(United States) / (United Kingdom) Michael Foale; EO-24; Fourth spaceflight
Wendy B. Lawrence was scheduled to replace C. Michael Foale onboard Mir. However, due to concerns about the minimum size restrictions of the Russian MIR Orlan EVA Spacesuit, that aspect of her mission was assigned to her backup, David Wolf, who was originally scheduled to fly on the STS-89 mission to Mir and join the Mir 24 crew.

=== Spacewalk ===
- Parazynski and Titov – EVA 1
- EVA 1 Start: 1 October 1997 – 17:29 UTC
- EVA 1 End: 1 October 1997 – 22:30 UTC
- Duration: 5 hours, 01 minutes

=== Crew seat assignments ===
Seat	Launch	Landing	Seats 1–4 are on the flight deck. Seats 5–7 are on the mid-deck.
1	Wetherbee		Seats 1–4 are on the flight deck. Seats 5–7 are on the mid-deck.
2	Bloomfield		Seats 1–4 are on the flight deck. Seats 5–7 are on the mid-deck.
3	Titov	Chrétien	Seats 1–4 are on the flight deck. Seats 5–7 are on the mid-deck.
4	Parazynski		Seats 1–4 are on the flight deck. Seats 5–7 are on the mid-deck.
5	Chrétien	Titov	Seats 1–4 are on the flight deck. Seats 5–7 are on the mid-deck.
6	Lawrence		Seats 1–4 are on the flight deck. Seats 5–7 are on the mid-deck.
7	Wolf	Foale	Seats 1–4 are on the flight deck. Seats 5–7 are on the mid-deck.

== Mission highlights ==
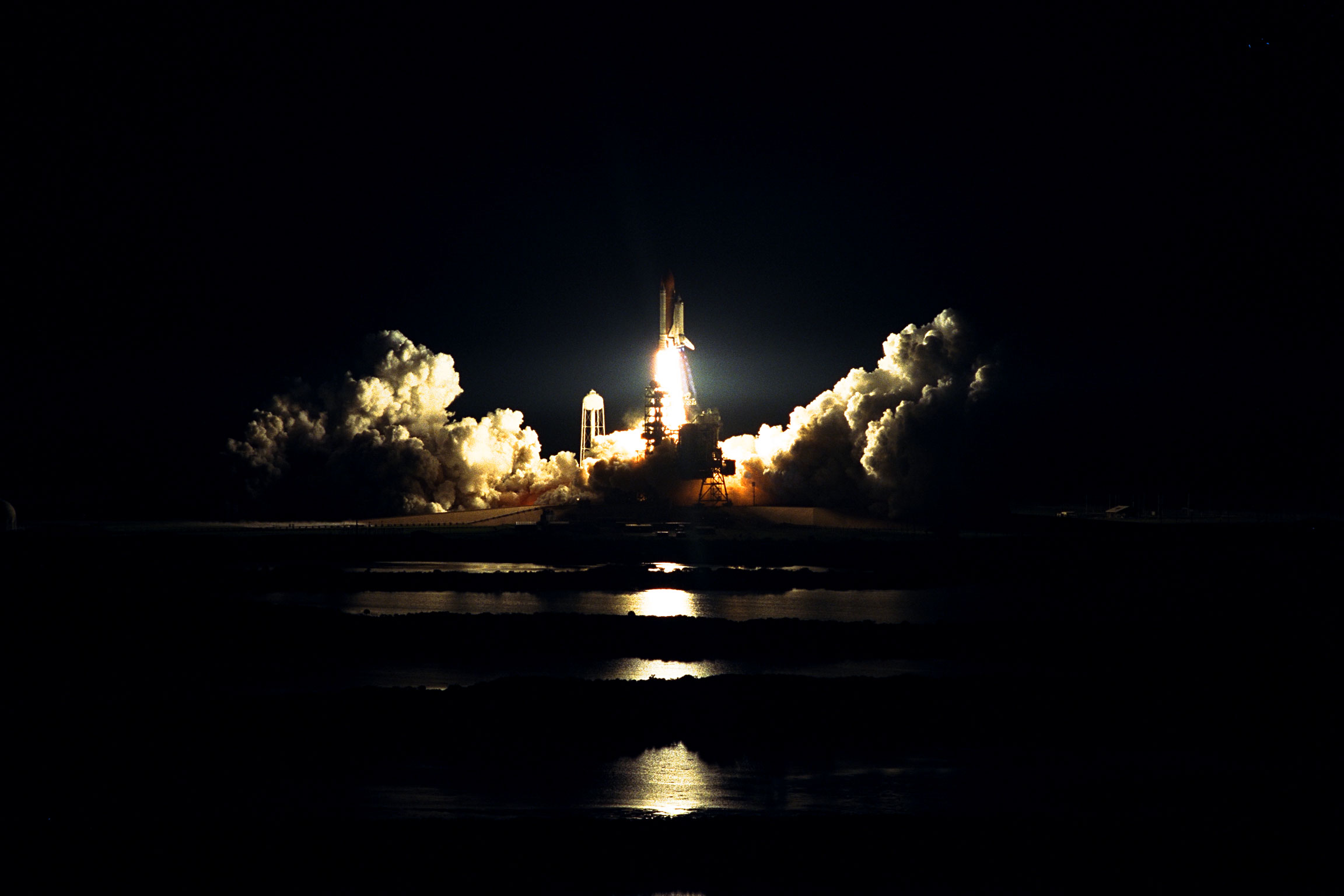
Launch of STS-86

STS-86 was the seventh Mir docking mission. It carried a SPACEHAB double module for the docking with Mir, cargo transfer and an astronaut exchange. The shuttle's previous Mir missions were STS-71, STS-74, STS-76, STS-79, STS-81 and STS-84. The mission continued the presence of a U.S. astronaut on the Russian space station with the transfer of physician David A. Wolf to Mir. Wolf became the sixth U.S. astronaut in succession to live on Mir to continue Phase 1B of the NASA/Russian Space Agency cooperative effort. However, the difficulties encountered by Foale and his predecessor aboard Mir, Jerry Linenger, had resulted in intense political pressure on NASA. The final decision between the termination of NASA crewing of Mir with Foale's departure, or his scheduled replacement by David Wolf was only made by NASA Administrator Daniel Goldin the night before the launch of STS-86.

Foale returned to Earth after spending 145 days in space, 134 of them aboard Mir. His estimated mileage logged was 58 million miles (93 million kilometers), making his the second longest U.S. space flight, behind Shannon Lucid's record of 188 days. His stay was marred by a collision on 25 June between a Progress resupply vehicle and the station's Spektr module, damaging a radiator and one of four solar arrays on Spektr. The mishap occurred while Mir 23 Commander Vasili Tsibliev was guiding the Progress capsule to a manual docking and depressurized the station. The crew sealed the hatch to the leaking Spektr module, leaving inside Foale's personal effects and several NASA science experiments, and repressurized the remaining modules.

An internal space walk by Tsibliev and Mir 23 Flight Engineer Aleksandr Lazutkin was planned to reconnect power cables to the three undamaged solar arrays, but during a routine medical exam 13 July Tsibliev was found to have an irregular heartbeat. Foale then began training for the space walk, but during one of the training exercises a power cable was inadvertently disconnected, leaving the station without power. On 21 July, it was announced that the internal space walk would not be conducted by the Mir 23 crew but their successors on Mir 24. On 30 July, NASA announced that Wendy Lawrence, originally assigned to succeed Foale on Mir, would instead remain on the shuttle, with backup David Wolf taking her place on Mir. The change was deemed necessary because Lawrence was too small for the Orlan suit used for Russian space walks. Although the initial plan had been to transfer Lawrence to Mir without spacewalk training, the necessity for repairs to the Spektr module required a spacewalk-capable astronaut.

Following their arrival at the station 7 August, Mir 24 Commander Anatoly Solovyev and Flight Engineer Pavel Vinogradov conducted the internal space walk inside the depressurized Spektr module 22 August, reconnecting 11 power cables from the Spektr's solar arrays to a new custom-made hatch for the Spektr. During the space walk, Foale remained inside the Soyuz capsule attached to Mir, in constant communication with the cosmonauts as well as ground controllers. On 5 September, Foale and Solovyev conducted a six-hour external extravehicular activity to survey damage outside Spektr and to try to pinpoint where the breach of the module's hull occurred. Two undamaged arrays were manually repositioned to better gather solar energy, and a radiation device left previously by Jerry Linenger was retrieved.

The docking of Atlantis and Mir took place at 3:58 pm EDT, 27 September, with the two mission commanders opening the spacecraft hatches at 5:45 pm Wolf officially joined the Mir 24 at noon EDT, 28 September. At the same time, Foale became a member of the STS-86 crew and began moving his personal belongings back into Atlantis. Wolf was eventually replaced by the seventh and last U.S. astronaut to transfer to Mir, Andrew S. W. Thomas, when the orbiter Endeavour docked with the Russian space station during the STS-89 mission in January 1998.

The first joint U.S.-Russian extravehicular activity during a Shuttle mission, which was also the 39th in the Space Shuttle program, was conducted by Titov and Parazynski. During the five-hour, one-minute space walk on 1 October, the pair affixed a 121-pound (55 kilograms (121 lb)) Solar Array Cap to the docking module for future use by Mir crew members to seal off the suspected leak in Spektr's hull. Parazynski and Titov also retrieved four Mir Environmental Effects Payloads (MEEPS) from the outside of Mir and tested several components of the Simplified Aid for EVA Rescue (SAFER) jet packs. The space walk began at 1:29 pm EDT and ended at 6:30 pm

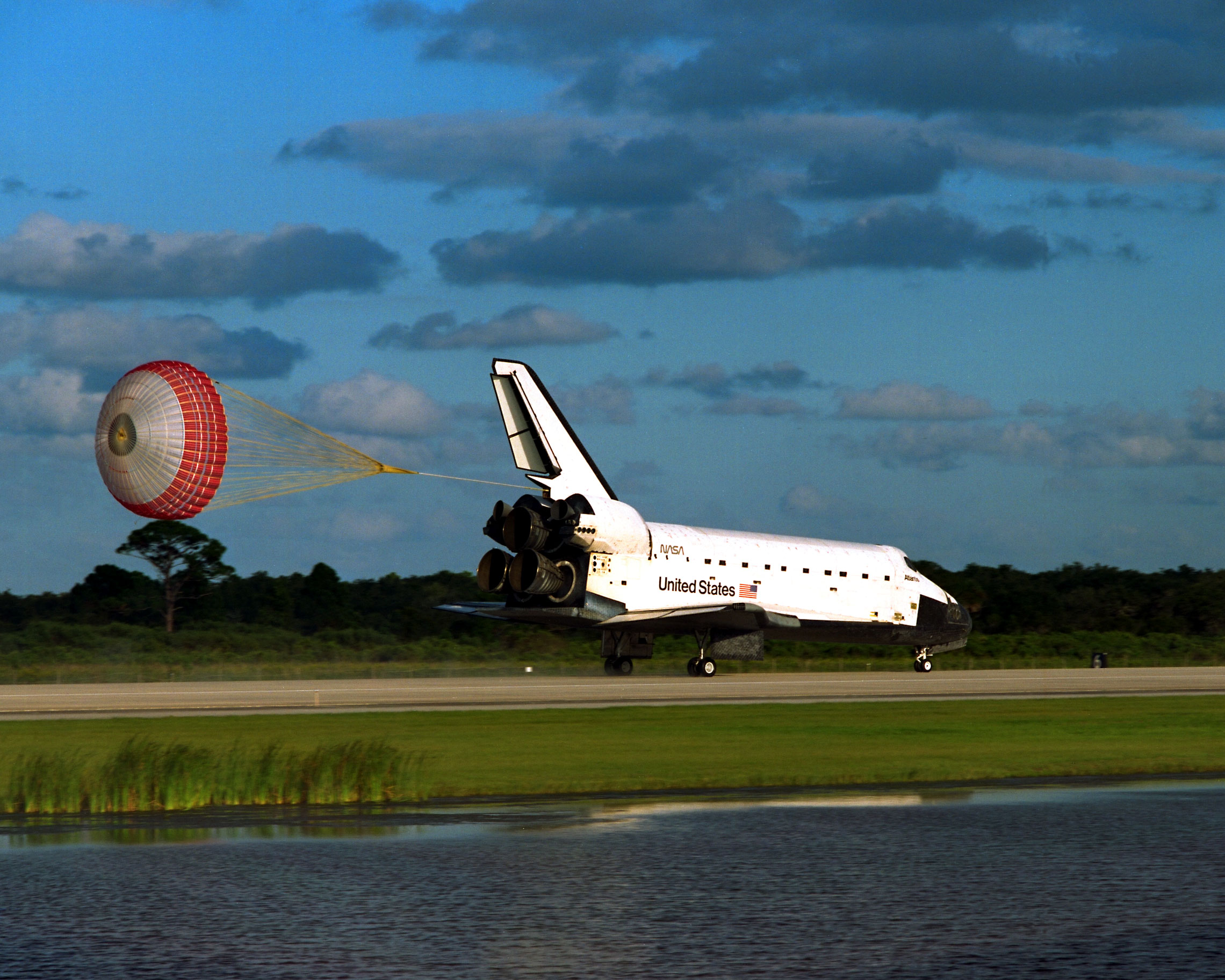
Atlantis lands on Runway 15 of the KSC Shuttle Landing Facility at the end of the STS-86 mission.

During the six days of docked operations, the joint Mir 24 and STS-86 crews transferred more than four tons of material from the SPACEHAB Double Module to Mir, including approximately 771 kilograms (1,700 lb) of water, experiment hardware for International Space Station Risk Mitigation experiments to monitor the Mir for crew health and safety, a gyrodyne, batteries, three air pressurization units with breathing air, an attitude control computer and many other logistics items. The new motion control computer replaced one that had experienced problems in recent months. The crew also moved experiment samples and hardware and an old Elektron oxygen generator to Atlantis for return to Earth. Undocking took place at 1:28 pm EDT, 3 October. After undocking, Atlantis performed a 46-minute flyaround visual inspection of Mir. During this maneuver, Solovyev and Vinogradov opened a pressure regulation valve to allow air into the Spektr module to see if STS-89 crew members could detect seepage or debris particles that could indicate the location of the breach in the damaged module's hull.

During the flight, Wetherbee and Bloomfield fired small jet thrusters on Atlantis to provide data for the Mir Structural Dynamics Experiment (MISDE), which measures disturbances to space station components and its solar arrays. Other experiments conducted during the mission were the Commercial Protein Crystal Growth investigation; the Cell Culture Module Experiment (CCM-A), the Cosmic Radiation Effects and Activation Monitor (CREAM) and the Radiation Monitoring Experiment-III (RME-III); the Shuttle Ionospheric Modification with Pulsed Local Exhaust (SIMPLE) experiment; and the Midcourse Space Experiment. Two NASA educational outreach programs were also conducted, Seeds in Space-II and KidSat.

== See also ==
- List of human spaceflights
- List of Space Shuttle missions
- Outline of space science
- Space Shuttle
