= Andy Thomas =

Australian-American astronaut (born 1951)

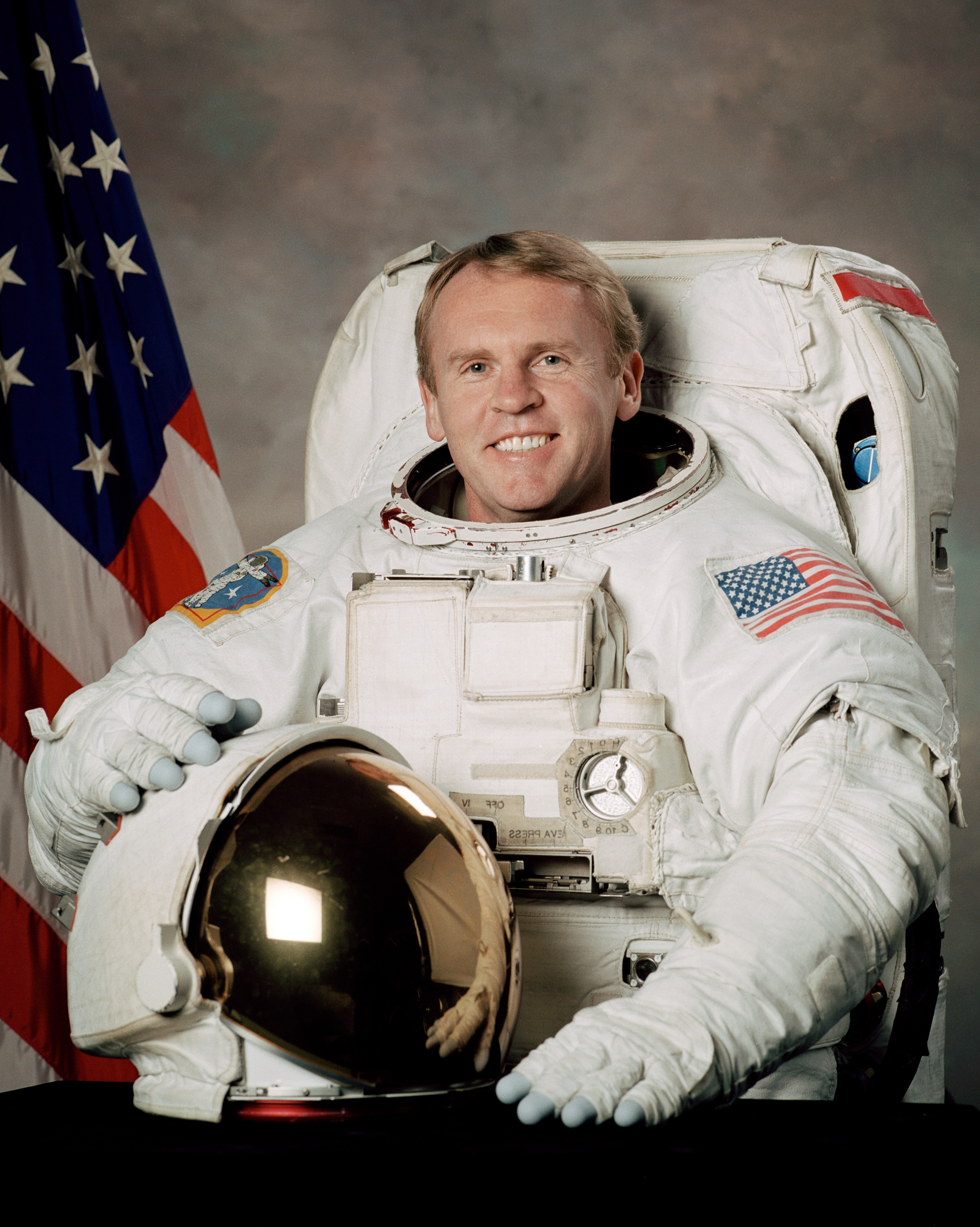
- Born: Andrew Sydney Withiel Thomas; 18 December 1951 (age 74); Adelaide, South Australia
- Education: University of Adelaide (BEng, PhD)
- Spouse: Shannon Walker
- Space career

NASA astronaut
- Time in space: 177d 9h 14m
- Selection: NASA Group 14 (1992)
- Total EVAs: 1 (during STS-102)
- Total EVA time: 6h, 21m
- Missions: STS-77; STS-89/91 (Mir EO-24/EO-25); STS-102; STS-114
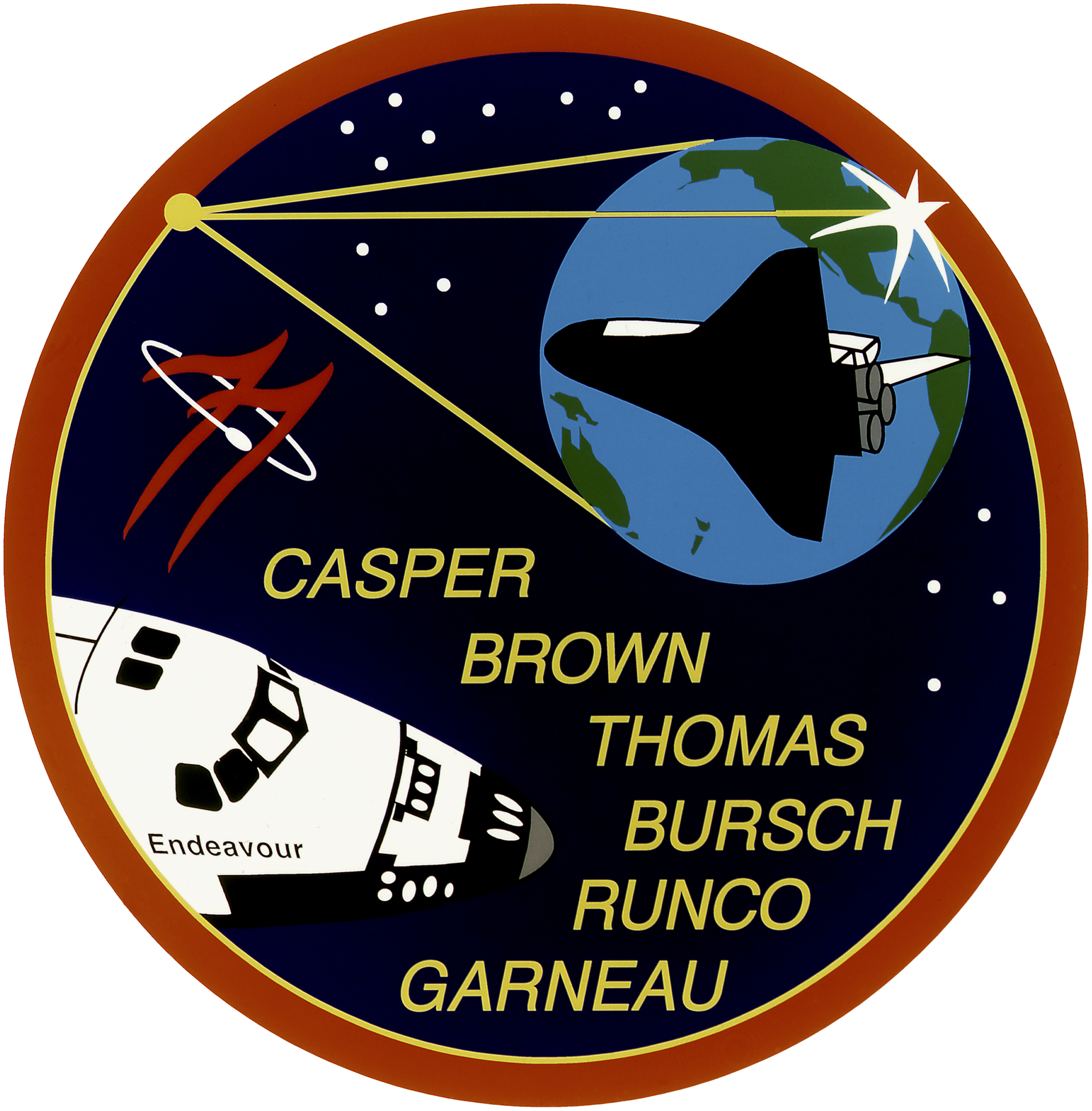
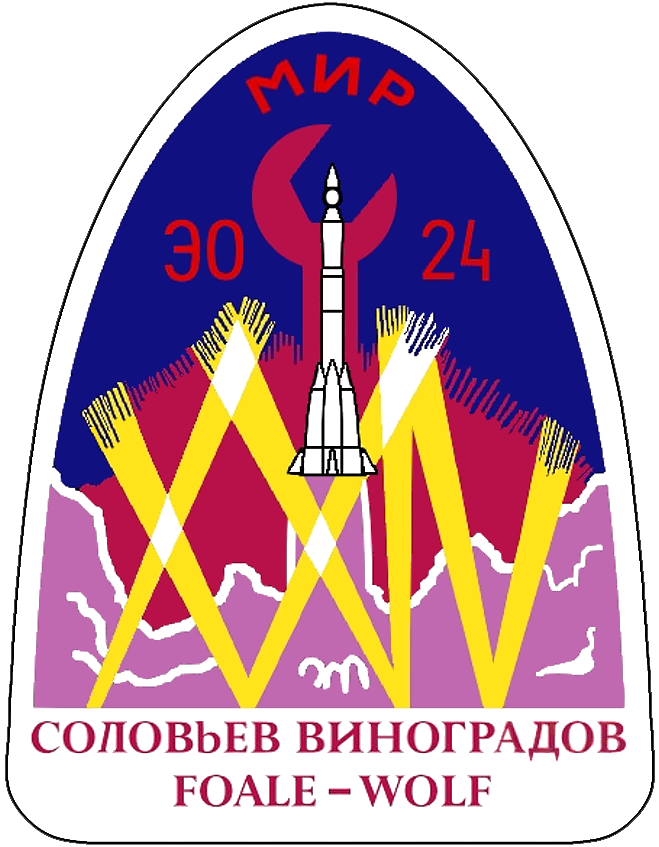
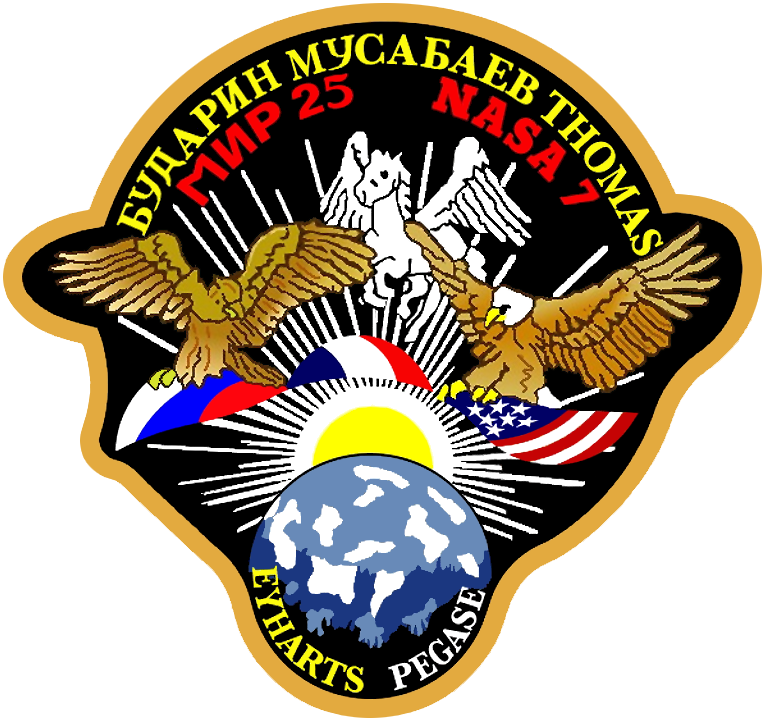
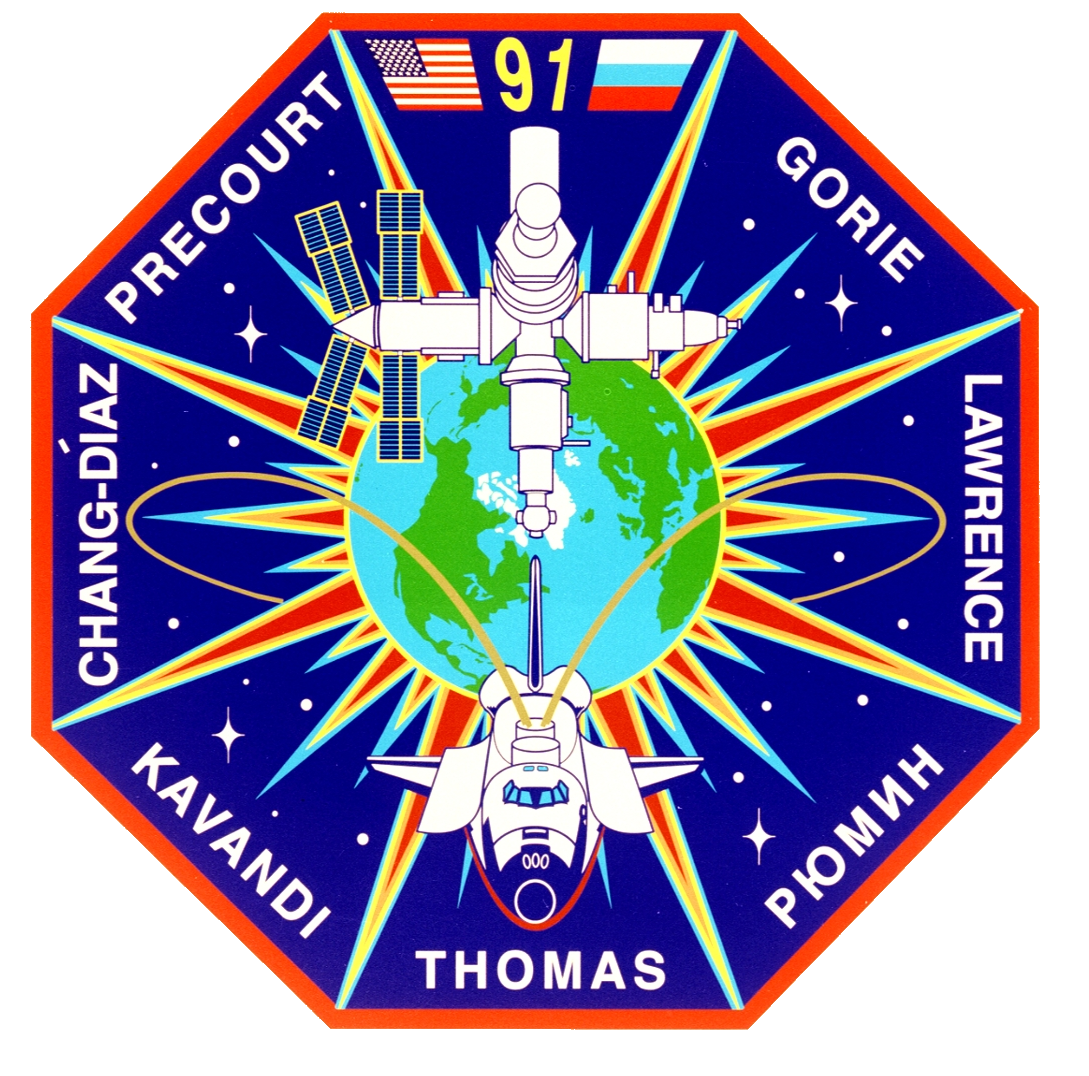
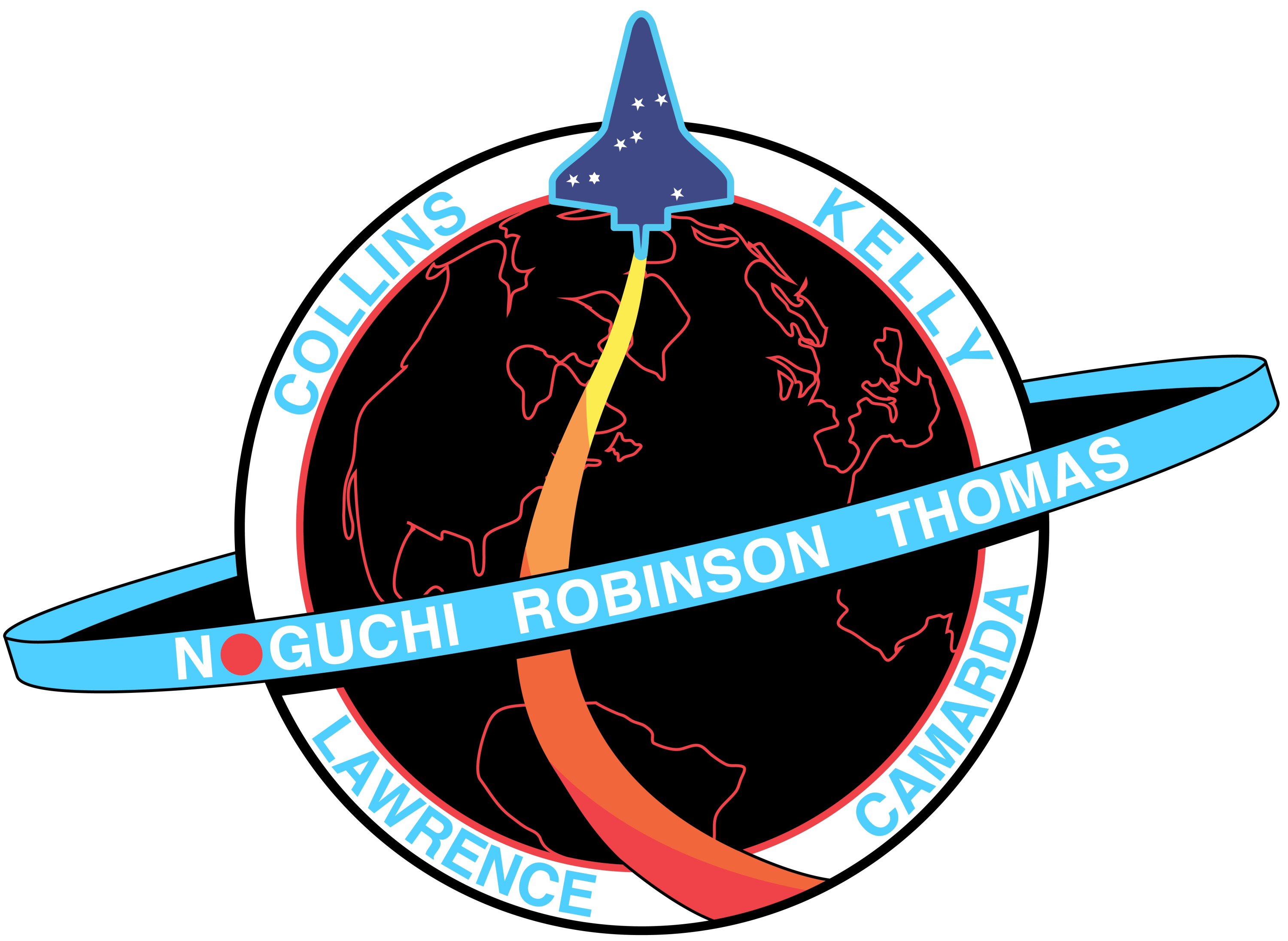
- Mission insignia

Andrew Sydney Withiel Thomas, AO (born 18 December 1951) is an Australian and American aerospace engineer and a former NASA astronaut. He has dual nationality; he became a U.S. citizen in December 1986, hoping to gain entry to NASA's astronaut program. He is married to fellow NASA astronaut Shannon Walker.

== Early life and education ==
Thomas went to St Andrews Primary School, Adelaide at Walkerville in South Australia and subsequently to St Peter's College, Adelaide. After secondary school, he studied at the University of Adelaide, where he received a BEng degree with First Class Honours in 1973 and a PhD degree in 1978, both in mechanical engineering.

He appears in the 1972 edition of the Adelaide University Engineering Society's (AUES) annual publication, Hysteresis. The caption below a photograph of the 21-year-old Thomas reads:

A.S.W. (Syd) Thomas: Hides his massive intellect behind a screen of silence and hair. His abilities are varied and include designing wine labels for the A.U.E.S.

— Hysteresis 2000 , pg 27

He is the great-great-grandson of Frederick George Waterhouse, first curator of the South Australian Institute Museum, and naturalist of the sixth expedition of John McDouall Stuart.

== Early career ==
As a child, growing up in Fullarton, Adelaide, Thomas was fascinated by space. His father has described how he started building model rockets from cardboard and plastics. After completing his studies, Thomas accepted an offer from Lockheed in Atlanta. By 1990 he was the organisation's principal aerodynamic scientist. His career continued in the field, steering towards more senior research positions.

== NASA career ==
Thomas was selected by NASA in March 1992 and reported to the Johnson Space Center in August 1992. In August 1993, following one year of training, he was appointed a member of the NASA Astronaut Corps and was qualified for an assignment as a mission specialist on Space Shuttle flight crews.

While awaiting space flight assignment, Thomas supported shuttle launch and landing operations as an Astronaut Support Person (ASP) at the Kennedy Space Center. He also provided technical support to the Space Shuttle Main Engine project, the Solid Rocket Motor project and the External Tank project at the Marshall Space Flight Center. In June 1995, Thomas was named as payload commander for STS-77 and flew his first flight in space on Endeavour in May 1996. Although Paul D. Scully-Power had entered orbit as an oceanographer in 1985, Thomas was the first Australia-born professional astronaut to enter space.

He next trained at the Gagarin Cosmonaut Training Center in Star City, Russia, in preparation for a long-duration flight. In 1998, he served as Board Engineer 2 aboard the Russian Space Station Mir for 140 days. From August 2001 to November 2003, Thomas served as Deputy Chief of the Astronaut Office. Thomas completed his fourth space flight on STS-114 and has logged over 177 days in space. He worked on issues for the Exploration Branch of the Astronaut Office until his retirement from NASA in February 2014.

NASA officially announced Thomas' retirement on 20 June 2014, which took effect on 1 March 2014, after 22 years with the space agency.

=== Spaceflights ===
STS-77 Endeavour (19 –29 May 1996) was a mission during which the crew deployed two satellites, tested a large inflatable space structure in orbit and conducted a variety of scientific experiments in a Spacehab laboratory module carried in Endeavour's payload bay. The flight was launched from the Kennedy Space Center on 19 May 1996 and completed 160 orbits 153 nautical miles (283 km) above the Earth while traveling 4.1 million miles and logging 240 hours and 39 minutes in space.

On 22 January 1998, Thomas again launched aboard Space Shuttle Endeavour as part of the STS-89 crew to dock with the Mir Space Station. He served aboard Mir as flight engineer 2 and returned to Earth with the crew of STS-91 aboard Space Shuttle Discovery on 12 June 1998, completing 130 days in space and 2,250 orbits of Earth.

STS-102 Discovery (8–21 March 2001) was the eighth Shuttle mission to visit the International Space Station and Thomas's third flight. Mission accomplishments included the delivery of the Expedition 2 crew and logistics resupply with the Leonardo Multi-Purpose Logistics Module, and then the return to Earth of the Expedition 1 crew. During the mission, Thomas performed an EVA of 6.5 hours to install components to the outside of the space station. The mission duration was 307 hours and 49 minutes.

STS-114 Discovery (26 July – 9 August 2005) was the Return to Flight mission following the Columbia accident during which the crew continued the assembly of the International Space Station. Thomas tested and evaluated new procedures for flight safety and inspection and repair techniques for the Shuttle's thermal protection system. After a 2-week, 5.8 million mile journey in space, the orbiter Discovery and its crew returned to land at Edwards Air Force Base, California. The mission duration was 333 hours, 32 minutes, 48 seconds.

== Post-NASA career ==
On 20 November 2020, the Andy Thomas Foundation was launched. The purpose was to advance space education, raise awareness, and contribute to the Australian space community.

== Honours and awards ==
- 1998: Oswald Watt Gold Medal (Australia's highest aviation award).
- 2000: Appointed Officer of the Order of Australia (AO) "for service to science and technology through the National Aeronautics and Space Administration (NASA) programme as an astronaut and for contributions to the human exploration of space."
- 2001: Centenary Medal
- 2018: Life Membership of the Space Industry Association of Australia
- One of the main roads near the International and Domestic Terminal at Adelaide International Airport (ADL) is named Andy Thomas Drive in his honour.
