= David Wolf (astronaut) =

American astronaut (born 1956)

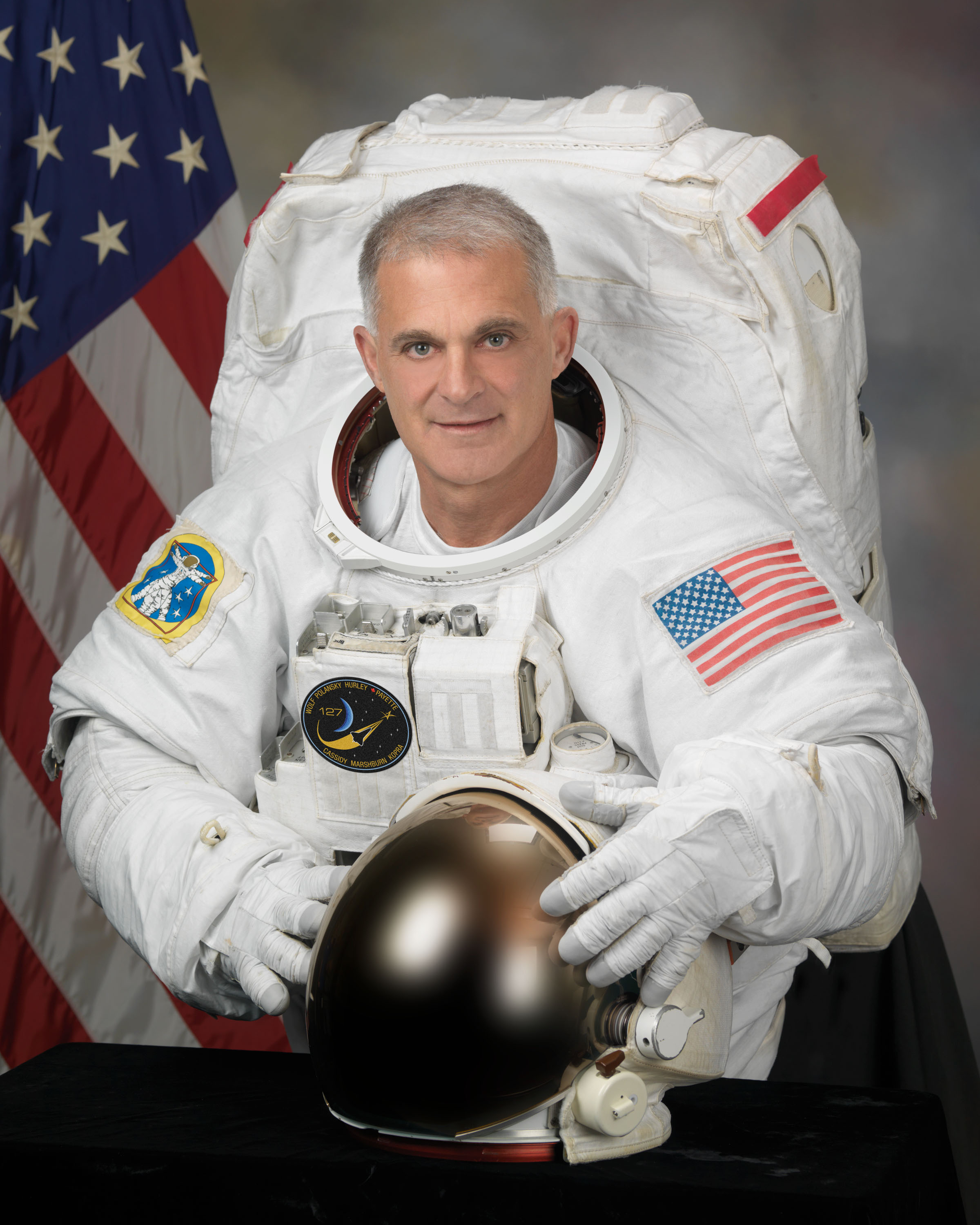
- Born: David Alexander Wolf; August 23, 1956 (age 70); Indianapolis, Indiana, U.S.
- Education: Purdue University (BS); Indiana University, Indianapolis (MD)
- Space career

NASA astronaut
- Time in space: 168d 8h 57m
- Selection: NASA Group 13 (1990)
- Total EVAs: 7
- Total EVA time: 41h 17m
- Missions: STS-58; Mir 24 (STS-86 / STS-89); STS-112; STS-127
- Mission insignia
- Retired: December 2012

David Alexander Wolf (born August 23, 1956) is an American retired astronaut, medical doctor and electrical engineer. Wolf has been to space four times. Three of his spaceflights were short-duration Space Shuttle missions, the first of which was STS-58 in 1993, and his most recent spaceflight was STS-127 in 2009. Wolf also took part in a long-duration mission aboard the Russian space station Mir which lasted 128 days, and occurred during Mir EO-24. He was brought to Mir aboard STS-86 in September 1997, and landed aboard STS-89 in January 1998. In total Wolf has logged more than 4,040 hours in space. He is also a veteran of seven spacewalks totaling 41hrs 17min in both Russian and American spacesuits.

== Education ==
Wolf was born in Indianapolis, Indiana and graduated from North Central High School. He then went on to receive a Bachelor of Science degree in electrical engineering from Purdue University, where he graduated with distinction and became a brother in the Alpha Tau Omega fraternity. In 1982, he earned a Doctor of Medicine degree from the Indiana University School of Medicine. He subsequently trained as a flight surgeon with the United States Air Force. Wolf joined the staff of Johnson Space Center in 1983 and investigated the physiological effects of microgravity.

== Honors and organizations ==
David Wolf has received numerous awards and honors. He is a recipient of the NASA Exceptional Engineering Achievement Medal in 1990 and NASA Inventor of the Year in 1992. Wolf received an Academic Achievement Award upon graduation from medical school. He received the Carl R. Ruddell scholarship award for research in medical ultrasonic signal and image processing. He is a member of Eta Kappa Nu and Phi Eta Sigma honorary societies. Wolf has received 15 U.S. Patents and over 20 Space Act Awards primarily for 3-dimensional tissue engineering technologies, earning the Texas State Bar Patent of the Year in 1994. He has published over 40 technical papers.

Dave Wolf is a member of the Institute of Electrical and Electronics Engineers, the Aerospace Medical Association, the Experimental Aircraft Association, the International Aerobatic Club, and the Indiana Air National Guard (retired).

The City of Indianapolis honored Wolf by naming Marion County Bridge 0501F (carrying E. 82nd St. over the White River) the "Astronaut David Wolf Bridge."

== NASA career ==
David Wolf began his NASA career in the Medical Sciences Division at the Johnson Space Center in Houston, Texas. He was responsible for engineering development and spacecraft avionics integration of the American Flight Echocardiograph for investigating cardiovascular physiology in microgravity. Upon completion, he was assigned as chief engineer for design of the Space Station medical facility, directly responsible for multidisciplinary team management, requirements definition, system design, spacecraft systems integration, project schedule, functional and safety verification, and budgetary authority. Dave Wolf was selected by NASA as an astronaut candidate in 1990. He completed 18 months of training before being qualified for flight. He was assigned to Kennedy Space Center in Florida where he was involved in Orbiter vehicle processing and testing and as a Capcom (including for the historic docking of Space Shuttle Atlantis with Space Station Mir in 1995). He is an expert in Extravehicular Activity (Spacewalk), Spacesuit design, and Rendezvous navigation. Some of his other qualifications include Robotic Manipulator System (Robot Arm) operations, on-orbit systems repair, computer networking, and as Shuttle re-entry flight deck engineer. Wolf retired from NASA in December 2012.

During his training for a Mir expedition, he lived and trained in Star City, Russia at the Yuri Gagarin Cosmonaut Training Center. Wolf became fluent in Russian, as all of his training there was in Russian.

Wolf and fellow Jewish astronaut Jeffrey A. Hoffman had "a running battle, a running argument on who has the longest dreidel spin." Other Jewish artifacts he took into space and brought back include "a yad – a Torah pointer, and .. a small menorah."

== Spaceflight experience ==
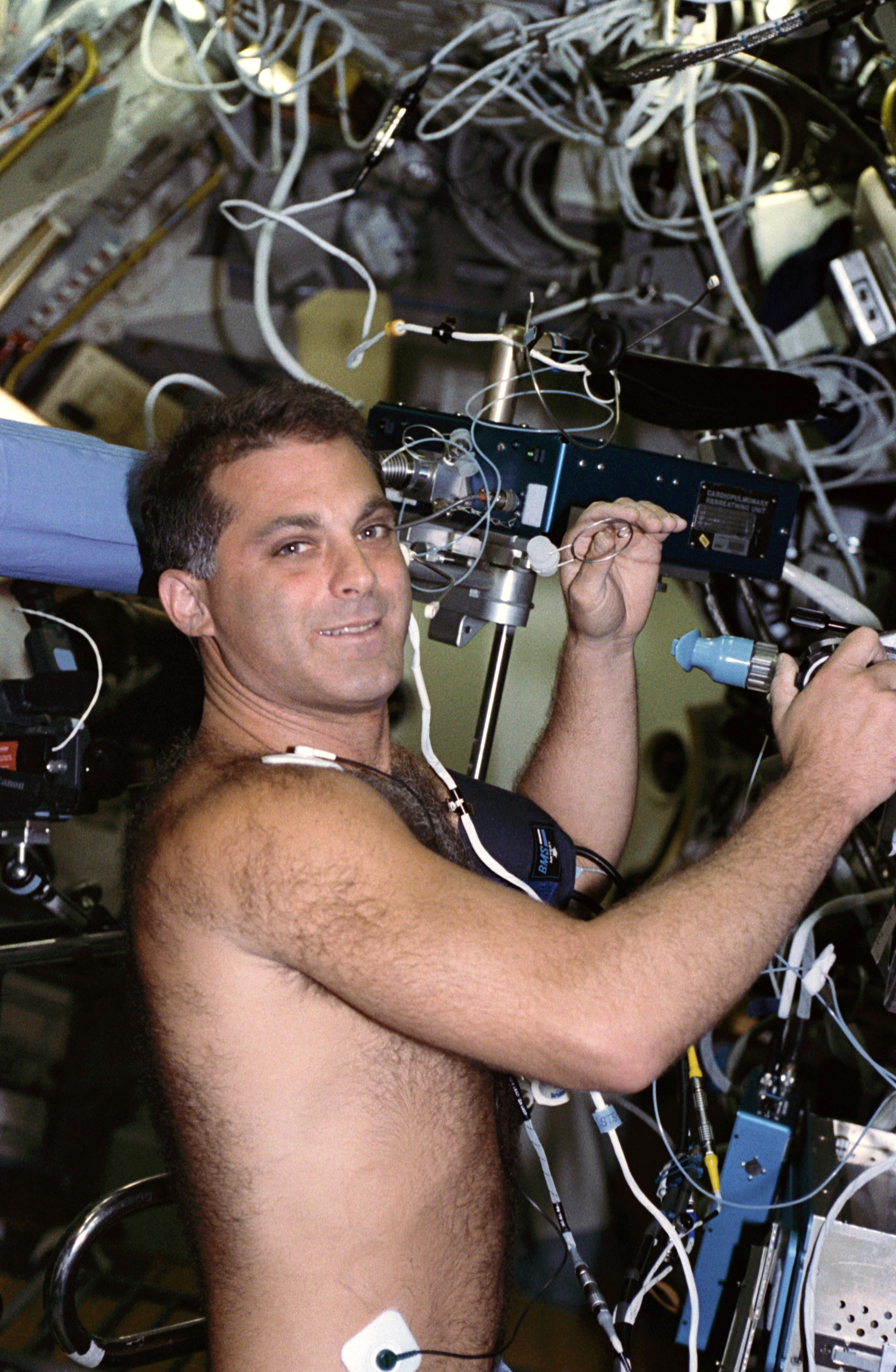
Wolf performing an experiment during the STS-58 mission

=== STS-58 ===
David Wolf served as mission specialist 3 aboard Columbia during the STS-58 mission. STS-58, designated Spacelab Life Sciences 2, was the second dedicated mission to study regulatory physiology, cardiovascular/cardiopulmonary, musculoskeletal and neuroscience. The mission lasted 14 days, 0 hours, 12 minutes and 32 seconds. Columbia landed at Edwards Air Force Base in California. At the time of landing STS-58 was the longest duration mission flown.

=== Mir Expedition 24 ===
Wolf flew aboard Atlantis on STS-86 in September 1997. Wolf was only on board for a short time as he was being transported to the Russian Mir space station. Atlantis docked with the Mir space station on September 27, 1997, which marked the start of Dave Wolf's stay on Mir.

David Wolf spent 128 days aboard space station Mir. He conducted a number of experiments and studies including, advanced microgravity tissue engineering techniques, electromagnetic levitation platform capability, colloid behavior, radio-tracer studies of altered human erythropoetic function, and human microgravity physiology studies. During his stay, there were a number of systems failures including multiple failed spacecraft systems, including atmospheric life support, three total power system failures, loss of attitude control, primary computer system failure, humidity separation system loss. An emergency ingress had to be made during an EVA performed in the Russian Orlan space suit due to airlock hatch failure. The entire mission and training were conducted solely in Russian.

While aboard Mir, Wolf became the first American to vote from space, casting a ballot in a 1997 local election.

STS-89 was David Wolf's return ride home to earth. STS-89 docked with Mir on January 24, 1998, marking the end of Wolf's stay on Mir. Endeavour touched down on January 31, 1998.

=== STS-112 ===
Dave Wolf flew aboard Atlantis during the STS-112 mission. STS-112 delivered the S1 truss segment the International Space Station (ISS). Atlantis launched on October 7, 2002, from Kennedy Space Center. Wolf conducted 3 spacewalks, to install the S1 truss segment and other EVA hardware. He spent a total of 19hrs and 1 minute outside the ISS. Atlantis landed on October 18, 2002, ending STS-112 at 10 days, 19 hours, 58 minutes and 44 seconds.

=== STS-127 ===
David Wolf last flew on Endeavour during the STS-127 (2J/A) mission. The STS-127 launched on July 15, 2009, and the mission delivered the Japanese Experiment Logistics Module – Exposed Section (ELM-ES) and new expedition member Timothy Kopra. STS-127 was originally scheduled to launch in June 2009 but was delayed after a leak was detected at the gaseous hydrogen vent line. A second attempt was made 3 days after the first try but was scrubbed for the same problem. A third launch attempt was canceled due to bad weather and a further delay occurred when lightning struck near the pad. Wolf conducted 3 spacewalks, totaling 18hrs 24min. STS-127 landed on July 31, 2009, and lasted 15 days, 16hrs, 44min and 58seconds.
