= Ding Weifen =

- 丁惟汾
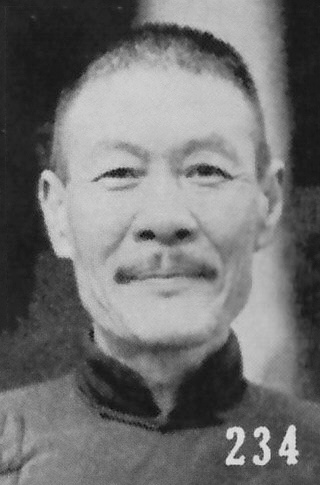
- Ding Weifen as pictured in The Most Recent Biographies of Chinese Dignitaries

Vice-President of Control Yuan
- In office 28 December 1931 – 1935
- President: Yu Youren
- Preceded by: Chen Guofu
- Succeeded by: Hsu Chung-chih

Personal details
- Born: 1874 Rizhao, Shandong, Qing Empire
- Died: 1954 (aged 79–80) Taipei, Taiwan
- Party: Kuomintang
- Relations: Grandnephew: Samuel C. C. Ting; Grandson in law: Yang Le
- Children: Daughter: Ding Yujuan
- Education: Baoding Normal College; Meiji University

Ding Weifen (Chinese: 丁惟汾; pinyin: Dīng Wéifén; 1874－12 May 1954) was a Chinese politician and founding father of the Kuomintang. He served as the vice-president of Control Yuan from 28 December 1931 to 1935.

== Biography ==
Ding was born in Taoluo Town of Rizhao, Shandong in 1874, the son of Ding Yici (丁以此), a teacher. His courtesy name was Dingcheng (鼎丞) and Dingchen (鼎臣). He had an elder brother, Ding Weisong (丁惟淞). In 1903, he attended Baoding Normal College. A year later, he went to Japan to study law at Meiji University. He joined the Tongmenghui on October 21, 1905. He founded the Bell (晨钟) with Jiang Yansheng. He returned to the China in Spring 1907, becoming President of Shandong School of Law and Politics. During 1911, he took part in Wuchang Uprising. He moved on to the house of representatives in 1912. He was a member of congress between 1917 and 1922. He founded North China Weekly (北方周刊) in 1918. He served as Head of the Propaganda Department and the Training Department of Kuomintang from 1927 to 1929. He was a member of the National Government from 17 September 1927 to 1947.

He was the Secretary General of Central Party Committee of Kuomintang in 1931. On December 28, 1931, he was appointed the vice-president of Control Yuan, a position he held until 1935. He was a member of Control Yuan from 31 May 1948 to 12 May 1954.

On May 12, 1954, he died in Taipei, Taiwan.

== Personal life ==
His daughter, Ding Yujuan (丁玉隽), was married to hydrologist Huang Wanli. His adopted daughter Tsun-ying Wong was one of the first group of women elected to the Legislative Yuan in 1948, and her son Samuel is an American physicist who received the Nobel Prize in 1976, with Burton Richter, for discovering the subatomic J/ψ particle. His grandson in law, Yang Le, is a member of the Chinese Academy of Sciences.
