= Sanmenxia Dam =

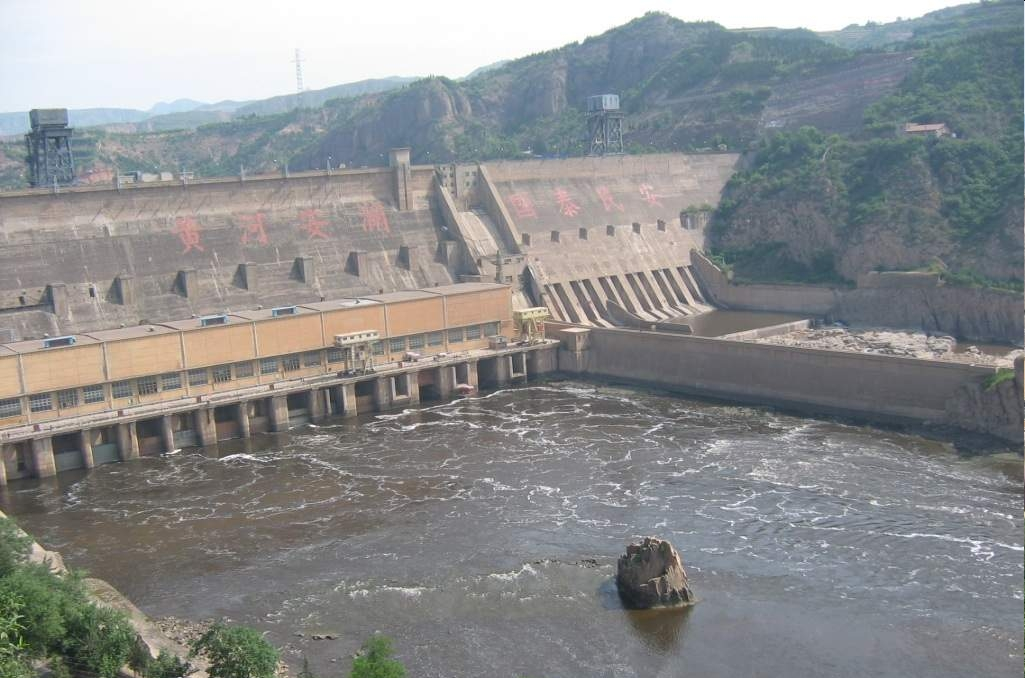

- Location within China
- Location: Sanmenxia
- Coordinates: 34°49′46″N 111°20′41″E
- Construction began: 1957
- Opening date: 1960

Dam and spillways
- Type of dam: Gravity
- Impounds: Yellow River
- Height: 106 m (348 ft)
- Length: 713 m (2,339 ft)

Reservoir
- Creates: Sanmenxia Reservoir
- Total capacity: 16,200,000,000 m^{3} (13,133,554 acre⋅ft)
- Catchment area: 688,400 km^{2} (265,793 sq mi)
- Surface area: 2,350 km^{2} (907 sq mi)
- Maximum length: 246 km (153 mi)

Power Station
- Commission date: 1973–1975
- Turbines: 5 x 50 MW, 2 x 75 MW Francis-type
- Installed capacity: 400 MW

The Sanmenxia Dam is a concrete gravity dam on the middle-reaches of the Yellow River near Sanmenxia Gorge on the border between Shanxi province and Henan Province, China. The dam is multi-purpose and was constructed for flood and ice control along with irrigation, hydroelectric power generation and navigation. Construction began in 1957 and was completed in 1960. It is the first major water control project on the Yellow River and was viewed as a major achievement of the new People's Republic of China. Subsequently, its image was printed on the country's bank notes. However, due to sediment accumulation in the reservoir, the dam later had to be re-engineered and renovated. The effects from sediment, which include flooding upstream, have placed the dam at the center of controversy and criticism-related arrests by the Chinese government.

== History ==
In response to centuries of flooding on the Yellow River, engineers initially proposed the Sanmenxia Dam in early 1935. In 1954, the Yellow River Planning Board was established and oversaw a survey of the river with help from Soviet engineers. The Soviet engineers recommended a dam at the Sanmenxia site. Original plans for the dam called for a maximum reservoir level 360 m (1,181 ft) above sea level (ASL). This would have required the relocation of 870,000 people and the flooding of 3,500 km^{2} (1,351 sq mi). The design was revised to a maximum level of 340 m (1,115 ft) ASL which required the relocation of 400,000 people and flooded much less area. In 1955 the Comprehensive River Basin Planning Report officially proposed the project. The report was submitted to the National People's Congress and swiftly approved that same year while preliminary construction began soon after. Under Soviet Union supervision, construction ceremoniously began on 13 April 1957. Construction on the left-bank cofferdam began in June 1957 and excavation was completed a year later along with the pouring of the left-bank foundation. In October 1958, construction on the right-bank cofferdam was initiated and the river was closed by November 1958. In June 1960, the reservoir was at full pool and the dam crest reached its design elevation of 353 m (1,158 ft) ASL in April 1961. The dam's generators were commissioned between 1973 and 1975. The dam was the first major water project on the Yellow River and constructed with manual labor. Upon completion, it was hailed as an engineering success for the new republic and its image was printed on Chinese banknotes.

=== Sediment and renovation ===
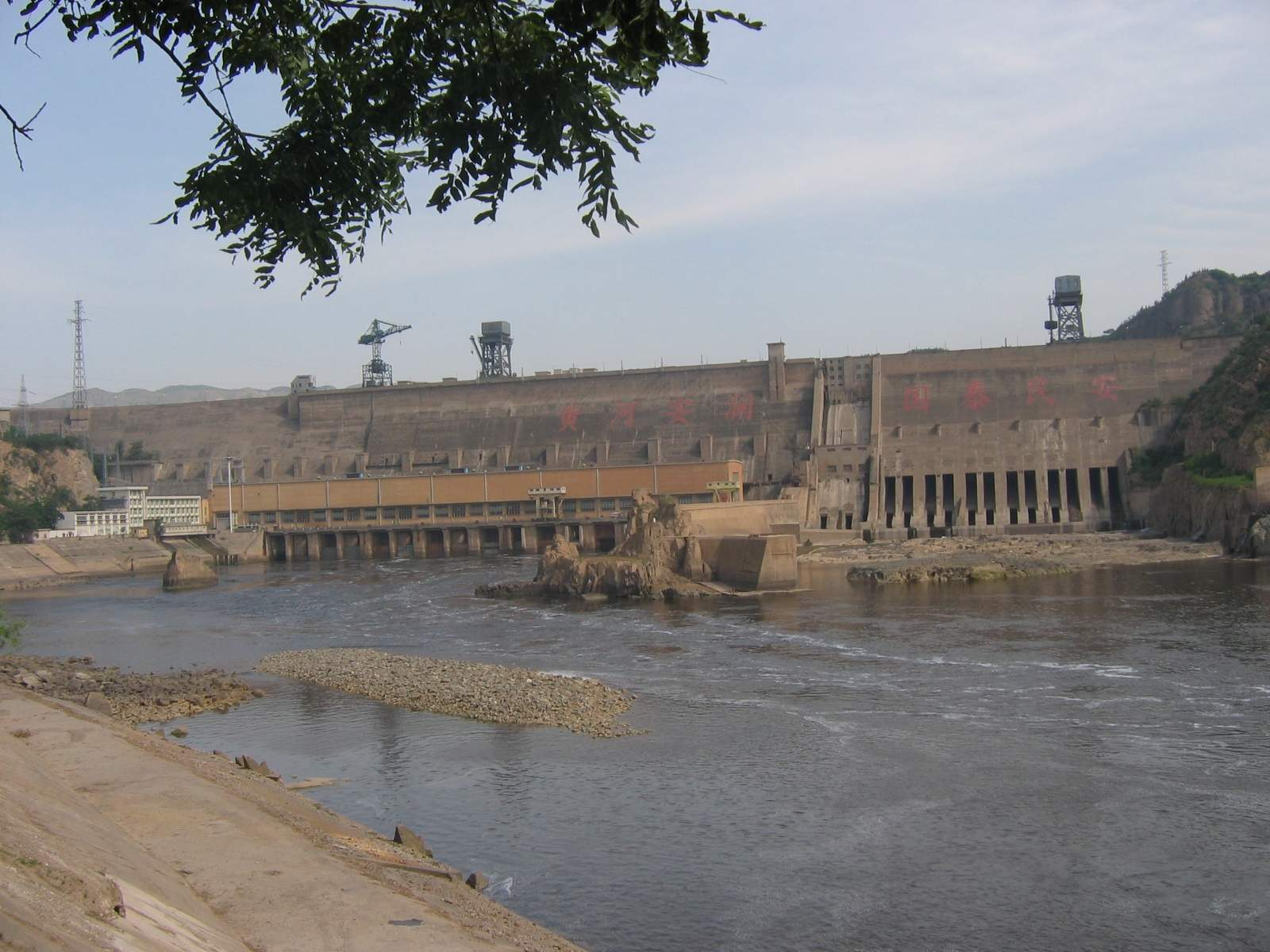
Downstream face of dam in 2007

Soon after completion, sediment-accumulation threatened the benefits of the dam. The Yellow River carries more sediment than any other in the world. During the 18 months after the river was closed, 1.8 billion metric tons of sediment had accumulated in the reservoir. Only 7% of the sediment-load was released downstream and the reservoir lost 17% of its capacity below a 335 m (1,099 ft) ASL elevation. Navigation and farmland were threatened upstream along with the relocation of an additional one million people. Despite the dam's 12 deep-sluices and alterations in the release of water, silt continued to build in the reservoir, particularly in the back waters. Responding to the potential crisis, a meeting was held in December 1964 with Premier Zhou Enlai. At the meeting, it was decided to reconstruct the dam's outlet works for improved discharges and silt control. The renovation was carried out immediately and in two stages. The first stage included the installation of two tunnels on the dam's left bank at an elevation of 290 m (951 ft) ASL along with converting four penstocks into flushing pipes. The flushing pipes began operating in 1966 and the tunnels in 1967 and 1968. In the second stage, eight bottom sluices were added to the left side of the dam which became operational between 1970 and 1971. Silt balance was achieved in 1970. Two more bottom sluices began operating in 1990 along with another in 1999 and the final in 2000.

=== Controversy and arrests ===
Impacts from sediment accumulation continued after renovation and also drew increasing criticism. The sediment has caused severe flooding on the Wei River upstream. Chinese engineer Zhang Guangdou described the project as a "mistake" in 2004 and remarked how hydrologist Huang Wanli had been sent to hard labour for opposing the project. Other engineers oppose the dam's existence but their silence is attributed to government reprisals. In August 2010, Chinese journalist Xie Chaoping was detained for writing The Great Migration, a book that criticized the dam and the government's handling of it. The next month, the book's printer, Zhao Shun, was also arrested. Xie was later released on bail.

== Design ==
The dam is a 106 m (348 ft) tall and 713 m (2,339 ft) long concrete gravity type. It sits at the head of a 688,400 km^{2} (265,793 sq mi) catchment area and withholds a reservoir with a 16,200,000,000 m^{3} (13,133,554 acre⋅ft) capacity. The reservoir covers a surface area of 2,350 km^{2} (907 sq mi) and stretches 246 km (153 mi) upstream to Longmen. The dam supports a power station that can hold up to eight turbines but currently only seven are installed. Five 50 MW and 75 MW Francis turbine-generators make up the arrangement for a total installed capacity of 400 MW.

== See also ==
- List of major power stations in Henan province
- List of dams and reservoirs in China
