= Martin Lewis Perl =

American scientist

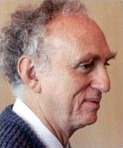
- Born: June 24, 1927; New York City, New York, U.S.
- Died: September 30, 2014 (aged 87); Palo Alto, California, U.S.
- Education: New York University; Columbia University
- Known for: Tau lepton
- Children: Jed Perl
- Awards: Nobel Prize in Physics in 1995; Wolf Prize in Physics in 1982
- Scientific career
- Fields: Physics
- Workplaces: University of Michigan; Stanford Linear Accelerator Center (SLAC); University of Liverpool
- Doctoral advisor: I. I. Rabi
- Doctoral students: Melissa Franklin, Samuel C. C. Ting

Martin Lewis Perl (June 24, 1927 – September 30, 2014) was an American chemical engineer and physicist who won the Nobel Prize in Physics in 1995 for his discovery of the tau lepton.

== Life and career ==
Perl was born in New York City, New York. His parents, Fay (née Resenthal or Rosenthal), a secretary and bookkeeper, and Oscar Perl, a stationery salesman who founded a printing and advertising company, were Jewish immigrants to the US from what was then the Polish area of Russia, being born in Kėdainiai (now in Lithuania) and Pruzhany (now in Belarus), respectively.

Perl was a 1948 chemical engineering graduate of Brooklyn Polytechnic Institute (now known as NYU-Tandon) in Brooklyn. After graduation, Perl worked for the General Electric Company, as a chemical engineer in a factory producing electron vacuum tubes. To learn about how the electron tubes worked, Perl signed up for courses in atomic physics and advanced calculus at Union College in Schenectady, New York, which led to his growing interest in physics, and eventually to becoming a graduate student in physics in 1950.

He received his Ph.D. from Columbia University in 1955, where his thesis advisor was I.I. Rabi. Perl's thesis described measurements of the nuclear quadrupole moment of sodium, using the atomic beam resonance method that Rabi had won the Nobel Prize in Physics for in 1944.

Following his Ph.D., Perl spent 8 years at the University of Michigan, where he worked on the physics of strong interactions, using bubble chambers and spark chambers to study the scattering of pions and later neutrons on protons. While at Michigan, Perl and Lawrence W. Jones served as co-advisors to Samuel C. C. Ting, who earned the Nobel Prize in Physics in 1976.

Seeking a simpler interaction mechanism to study, Perl started to consider electron and muon interactions. He had the opportunity to start planning experimental work in this area when he moved in 1963 to the Stanford Linear Accelerator Center (SLAC), then being built in California. He was particularly interested in understanding the muon: why it should interact almost exactly like the electron but be 206.8 times heavier, and why it should decay through the route that it does. Perl chose to look for answers to these questions in experiments on high-energy charged leptons. In addition, he considered the possibility of finding a third generation of lepton through electron-positron collisions.

Perl is one of the 20 American recipients of the Nobel Prize in Physics to sign a letter addressed to President George W. Bush in May 2008, urging him to "reverse the damage done to basic science research in the Fiscal Year 2008 Omnibus Appropriations Bill" by requesting additional emergency funding for the Department of Energy's Office of Science, the National Science Foundation, and the National Institute of Standards and Technology.

He died after a heart attack at Stanford University Hospital on September 30, 2014, at the age of 87. His son, Jed Perl, is an author and art critic for The New Republic.

=== Discovery of the tau particle ===
The tau lepton (τ, also called the tau particle, tauon or simply tau) is an elementary particle similar to the electron, with negative electric charge and a spin of 1/2, but with 3477 times the mass. Together with the electron, the muon, and the three neutrinos, it is classified as a lepton.

The tau was first detected in a series of experiments between 1974 and 1977 by Perl with his colleagues at the SLAC-LBL group. Their equipment consisted of SLAC's then-new e^{+}–e^{−} colliding ring, called SPEAR, and the LBL magnetic detector. They could detect and distinguish between leptons, hadrons and photons. SPEAR was able to collide electrons and positrons at higher energies than had previously been possible, initially at up to 4.8 GeV and eventually at 8 GeV, energies high enough to lead to the production of a tau/antitau pair. The tau has a lifetime of only 2.9×10^{−13} s and so these particles decayed within a few millimetres of the collision. Hence Perl and his coworkers did not detect the tau directly, but rather discovered anomalous events where they detected either an electron and a muon, or a positron and an antimuon:

We have discovered 64 events of the form

e^{+} + e^{−} → e^{±} + μ^{∓} + at least two undetected particles

for which we have no conventional explanation.

The need for at least two undetected particles was shown by the inability to conserve energy and momentum with only one. However, no other muons, electrons, photons, or hadrons were detected. It was proposed that this event was the production and subsequent decay of a new particle pair:

e^{+} + e^{−} → τ^{+} + τ^{−} → e^{±} + μ^{∓} + 4ν

This was difficult to verify, because the energy to produce the τ^{+}τ^{−} pair is similar to the threshold for D meson production. Work done at DESY-Hamburg, and with the Direct Electron Counter (DELCO) at SPEAR, subsequently confirmed the discovery and established the mass and spin of the tau.

The symbol τ was derived from the Greek τρίτον (triton, meaning "third" in English), since it was the third charged lepton discovered.

=== Nobel Prize and later career ===
Perl won the Nobel Prize in 1995 jointly with Frederick Reines. The prize was awarded "for pioneering experimental contributions to lepton physics". Perl received half "for the discovery of the tau lepton" while Reines received his share "for the detection of the neutrino". In 1996 he published Reflections on Experimental Science, which consists of "comments, scientific reprints, reflections, and a memoir ...".

He joined University of Liverpool as a visiting professor. He served on the board of advisors of Scientists and Engineers for America, an organization focused on promoting sound science in American government. In 1996, he received the Golden Plate Award of the American Academy of Achievement. In 2009, Perl received an honorary doctorate from the University of Belgrade.

== See also ==
- List of Jewish Nobel laureates
