= Lawrence W. Jones =

American particle physicist (1925–2023)

- Born: Lawrence William Jones; November 16, 1925; Evanston, Illinois, U.S.
- Died: June 30, 2023 (aged 97); Ann Arbor, Michigan, U.S.
- Education: Northwestern University (BS, MS); University of California, Berkeley (PhD)
- Awards: Ford Foundation Fellow, 1961; Guggenheim Fellow, 1964
- Scientific career
- Fields: Particle physics
- Workplaces: University of Michigan
- Thesis: Excitation function for photoneutron production from 80 to 320 mev (1952)
- Doctoral advisor: A. Carl Helmholz
- Notable students: Samuel C. C. Ting

Lawrence William Jones (November 16, 1925 – June 30, 2023) was an American academic and professor emeritus in the physics department at the University of Michigan. His field of interest was high energy particle physics.

== Early life and education ==
Lawrence W. Jones was born in Evanston, Illinois, on November 16, 1925.

His father was C. Herbert Jones, a mathematics teacher at New Trier High School. Lawrence Jones graduated from New Trier in 1943.

Jones entered Northwestern University in the summer of 1943 and was drafted into the U.S. Army in February 1944. He shipped to Europe on the RMS Aquitania in December 1944, and served in the Signal Corps Company of the 35th Infantry Division until December 1945, when he returned to the United States on the RMS Queen Mary. Jones returned to Northwestern for the spring term in 1946 and earned a B.S. with a double major in zoology and physics 1948 and an M.S. in 1949. In 1952 he received a Ph.D. at the University of California, Berkeley. He and his wife Ruth married in 1950, and they had three children.

== Career ==
Jones worked his entire career at the University of Michigan, where he joined the physics faculty as an instructor in 1952. He became an assistant professor there in 1956 and associate professor in 1960. He was promoted to professor in 1963, and he served as physics department chair between 1982 and 1987.

With Martin Perl, he was dissertation advisor to Samuel C. C. Ting in 1962.

== Research ==
Jones's research depended on and led to developments in particle accelerators and detectors. In the 1950s, he collaborated in the Midwestern Universities Research Association, which developed the concept of colliding beams in modern particle accelerators. He contributed to development of the scintillation chamber, optical spark chamber, and the ionization calorimeter for hadron energy measurement. He participated in experiments on hadron cross-sections as well as elastic and inelastic scattering and production of particles, dimuons, neutrinos, and proton charm production.

In 1983, Jones joined in the L3 experiment led by his former student, Nobel laureate Samuel C.C. Ting. He and Michigan colleagues designed and constructed the hadron calorimeter. He also contributed to research in medical radioisotope imaging and was an early proponent of the hydrogen fuel economy.

Regents of the University of Michigan named Jones professor emeritus of physics in 1998.

== Death ==
Jones died in Ann Arbor, Michigan, on June 30, 2023, at the age of 97.

== Honors ==
Jones was a Ford Foundation Fellow (1961–1962) and a Guggenheim Fellow (1964–1965) at CERN in Switzerland.

== Selected publications ==
With four colleagues, he wrote Innovation was not Enough; the History of the Midwestern Universities Research Association (MURA), which World Scientific published in 2009, describing their work researching particle accelerator design between 1950–1960.

Jones co-authored 369 publications and solo authored 6 papers.

== See also ==
- Accelerator physics
- Cosmology
- Standard Model
