= Samuel C. C. Ting =

Nobel prize winning physicist

- 丁肇中
- Ting in 1976
- Born: January 27, 1936 (age 90); Ann Arbor, Michigan, U.S.
- Education: National Cheng Kung University; University of Michigan (BS, BS, MS, PhD)
- Known for: Discovery of the J/ψ particle Founder of the Alpha Magnetic Spectrometer experiment
- Awards: Ernest Orlando Lawrence Award (1975); Nobel Prize for Physics (1976); Eringen Medal (1977); De Gasperi Award (1988); Gold Medal for Science from Brescia (1988); NASA Public Service Medal (2001)
- Scientific career
- Fields: Particle physics
- Workplaces: Columbia University; Massachusetts Institute of Technology
- Thesis: An Investigation of Pion-Proton Interactions at High Energies (1962)
- Doctoral advisor: Lawrence W. Jones; Martin Lewis Perl

Chinese name
- Chinese: 丁肇中
Transcriptions
Standard Mandarin
- Hanyu Pinyin: Dīng Zhàozhōng
- Wade–Giles: Ting¹ Chao⁴-chung¹
- Website: Samuel Ting

Chao Chung Ting (Chinese: 丁肇中; pinyin: Dīng Zhàozhōng, born January 27, 1936), also known by his English name Samuel, is a Taiwanese-American particle physicist who was awarded the Nobel Prize in Physics in 1976 with Burton Richter for discovering the subatomic J/ψ particle. He is the Thomas Dudley Cabot Institute Chair at the Massachusetts Institute of Technology (MIT).

== Early life and education ==
Ting was born on January 27, 1936, at the University of Michigan Hospital in Ann Arbor, Michigan, to first generation immigrant parents from Ju County, Shandong, China. His parents, Kuan-hai Ting and Tsun-ying Wong, met and married as graduate students at the University of Michigan. When Ting was born, his parents had just earned their master's degrees from the University of Michigan and his father, a civil engineer, had received a professorship to teach at the China University of Mining and Technology.

Ting's parents returned to China two months after his birth. Throughout the Second Sino-Japanese War, Ting was homeschooled by his parents. After the Chinese Civil War, Ting moved to Taiwan with his family in 1949 during the Great Retreat. He would live there as a Taiwanese waishengren from 1949 to 1956 and conducted most of his formal schooling there. His mother taught psychology as a professor at National Taiwan University (NTU).

Ting attended and finished middle school in Taiwan. After graduating from Taipei Municipal Chien Kuo High School, he attained a perfect score on the college entrance examinations and entered National Cheng Kung University in September 1955 to study mechanical engineering. As an undergraduate, he completed one semester at the university with high grades in mathematics and science.

In 1956, Ting, who barely spoke English, returned to the United States at the age of 20 and won a scholarship to attend the University of Michigan, where a family friend, G. G. Brown (dean of the College of Engineering), invited him to enroll. He studied engineering, mathematics, and physics there, completing his bachelor's degrees, master's degree, and doctorate in only six years. He earned two Bachelor of Science (B.S.) degrees in engineering, mathematics, and physics in 1959, a Master of Science (M.S.) in physics in 1960, and his Ph.D. in physics in 1962. His doctoral studies were funded by a grant by the United States Atomic Energy Commission.

As a graduate student at Michigan, Ting befriended Homer Neal, a classmate. One of Ting's doctoral advisors, the physicist Lawrence W. Jones, described him as "very talented academically" and "a young man in a hurry".

== Career ==
In 1963, Ting worked at the European Organization for Nuclear Research (CERN). From 1965, he taught at Columbia University in the City of New York and worked at the Deutsches Elektronen-Synchrotron (DESY) in Germany. Since 1969, Ting has been a professor at the Massachusetts Institute of Technology (MIT).

Ting received the Ernest Orlando Lawrence Award in 1976, Nobel Prize in Physics in 1976, Eringen Medal in 1977, DeGaspari Award in Science from the Government of Italy in 1988, Gold Medal for Science from Brescia, Italy in 1988, and the NASA Public Service Medal in 2001.

== Nobel Prize ==
In 1976, Ting was awarded the Nobel Prize in Physics, which he shared with Burton Richter of the Stanford Linear Accelerator Center, for the discovery of the J/ψ meson nuclear particle. They were chosen for the award, in the words of the Nobel committee, "for their pioneering work in the discovery of a heavy elementary particle of a new kind." The discovery was made in 1974 when Ting was heading a research team at MIT exploring new regimes of high energy particle physics.

Ting gave his Nobel Prize acceptance speech in Mandarin. Although there had been Chinese Nobel Prize recipients before (Tsung-Dao Lee and Chen Ning Yang), none had previously delivered the acceptance speech in Chinese. In his Nobel banquet speech, Ting emphasized the importance of experimental work:

In reality, a theory in natural science cannot be without experimental foundations; physics, in particular, comes from experimental work. I hope that awarding the Nobel Prize to me will awaken the interest of students from the developing nations so that they will realize the importance of experimental work.

== Alpha Magnetic Spectrometer ==
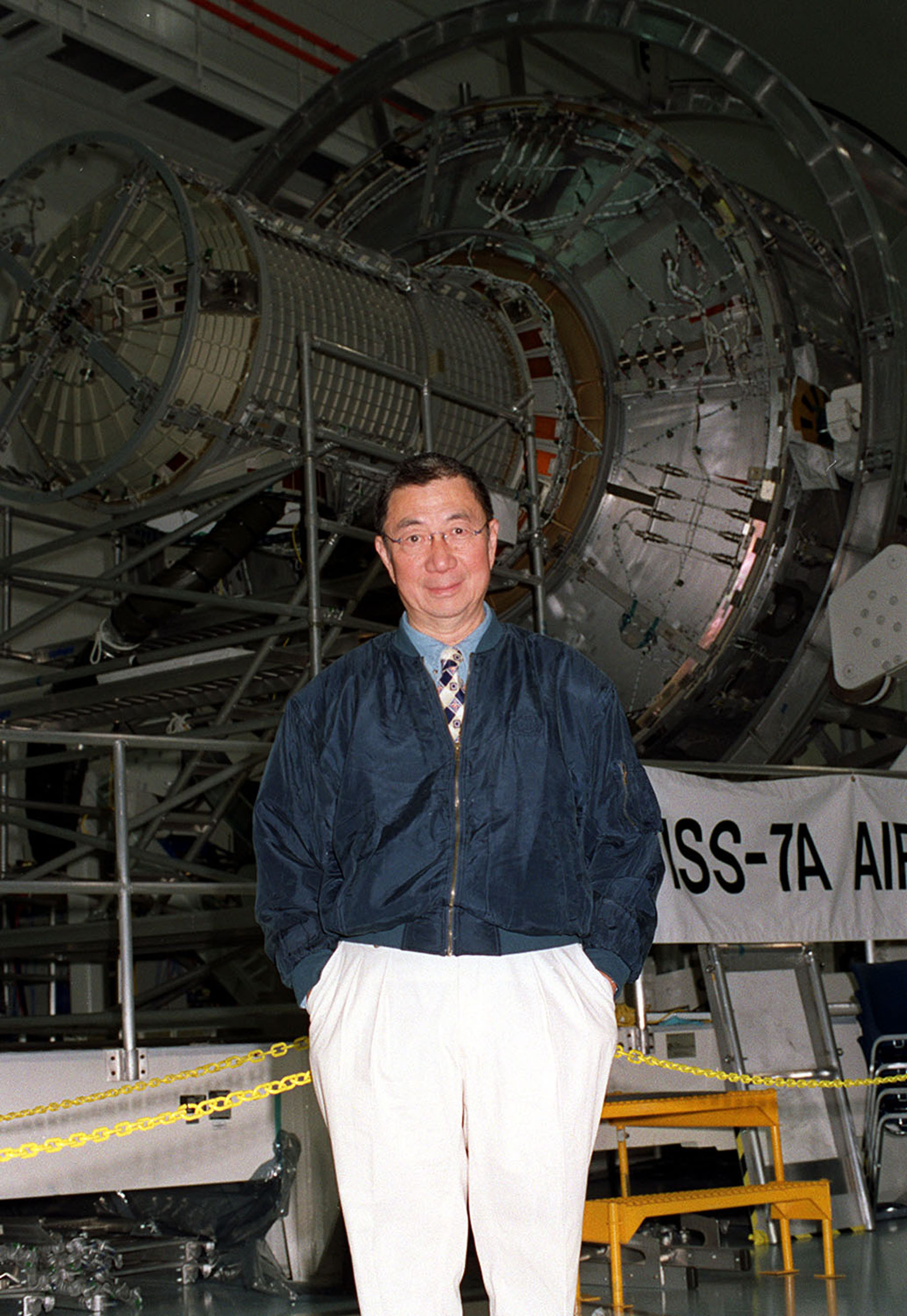
Ting in the Space Station Processing Facility, 2000

In 1995, not long after the cancellation of the Superconducting Super Collider project had severely reduced the possibilities for experimental high-energy physics on Earth, Ting proposed the Alpha Magnetic Spectrometer, a space-borne cosmic-ray detector. The proposal was accepted and he became the principal investigator and has been directing the development since then. A prototype, AMS-01, was flown and tested on Space Shuttle mission STS-91 in 1998. The main mission, AMS-02, was then planned for launch by the Shuttle and mounting on the International Space Station.

This project is a massive $2 billion undertaking involving 500 scientists from 56 institutions and 16 countries. After the 2003 Space Shuttle Columbia disaster, NASA announced that the Shuttle was to be retired by 2010 and that AMS-02 was not on the manifest of any of the remaining Shuttle flights. Dr. Ting was forced to (successfully) lobby the United States Congress and the public to secure an additional Shuttle flight dedicated to this project. Also during this time, Ting had to deal with numerous technical problems in fabricating and qualifying the large, extremely sensitive and delicate detector module for space. AMS-02 was successfully launched on Shuttle mission STS-134 on May 16, 2011, and was installed on the International Space Station on May 19, 2011.

== Research ==
- Discovery of nuclear anti-matter (the anti-deuteron).
- Measuring the size of the electron family (the electron, the muon, and the tau) showing that the electron family has zero size (with a radius smaller than 10^{−17} cm).
- Precision study of light rays and massive light rays showing that light rays and massive light rays (vector mesons) can transform into each other at high energies and providing a critical verification of the quark model.
- Precision measurement of the radius of the atomic nuclei.
- Discovery of a new kind of matter (the J particle) at the Brookhaven National Laboratory. The Nobel Prize was awarded to Ting for this discovery.
- Discovery of the gluon (the particle responsible for transmitting the nuclear force).
- A systematic study of the properties of gluons.
- A precision measurement of muon charge asymmetry, demonstrating for the first time the validity of the Standard Electroweak Model (Steven Weinberg, Sheldon Glashow and Abdus Salam).
- Determination of the number of electron families and neutrino species in the Universe and the precision verification of the Electroweak Unification Theory.
- Proposed, constructed and leads the Alpha Magnetic Spectrometer (AMS) experiment on the International Space Station involving the participation of a 16 nation collaboration searching for the existence of antimatter, the origin of dark matter and the properties of cosmic rays.
- Development of the first large superconducting magnet for space application.
- AMS results, based on 15 years in space and more than 260 billion cosmic rays, have changed our understanding of the cosmos.

== Honors and awards ==
=== Major Awards ===
- Nobel Prize for Physics (1976)
- Ernest Orlando Lawrence Award (U.S. government)
- Eringen Medal (the Society of Engineering Science)
- DeGaspari Award in Science (Italian government)
- NASA Public Service Medal
- Erice Prize for Peace (World Federation of Scientists)
- Gold Medal for Science (Italy)
- Award for Compelling Results in Physical Sciences (2017, NASA)
- Golden Plate Award of the American Academy of Achievement
- Golden Leopard Award for Excellence, Taormina, Italy
- Homi Bhabha Medal and Prize (2023)
- Basic Science Lifetime Award, ICBS (2025)

=== Member or Foreign Member of Scientific Academies ===
- United States National Academy of Sciences
- American Academy of Arts and Sciences
- Soviet Academy of Science
- Russian Academy of Sciences
- Deutsche Akademie der Naturforscher Leopoldina (Germany)
- Spanish Royal Academy of Sciences
- Hungarian Academy of Sciences
- Pakistan Academy of Sciences
- Academia Sinica
- Chinese Academy of Sciences
- Honorary Fellow of the Tata Institute of Fundamental Research

=== Doctor Honoris Causa degrees ===
- University of Bologna
- Moscow State University
- University of Bucharest
- National Tsing Hua University (Taiwan)
- National Chiao Tung University (Taiwan)
- Rheinisch-Westfälische Technische Hochschule Aachen
- University of Michigan
- Columbia University
- Gustavus Adolphus College
- University of Science and Technology of China
- Hong Kong University of Science and Technology
- National Central University
- Hong Kong Baptist University
- Chinese University of Hong Kong

== Personal life ==
Ting lived in a turbulent age during his childhood and his family was a big influence on him. In his biographical for the Nobel Prize, he recalled:

Since both my parents were working, I was brought up by my maternal grandmother. My maternal grandfather lost his life during the first Chinese Revolution. After that, at the age of thirty-three, my grandmother decided to go to school, became a teacher, and brought my mother up alone. When I was young I often heard stories from my mother and grandmother recalling the difficult lives they had during that turbulent period and the efforts they made to provide my mother with a good education. Both of them were daring, original, and determined people, and they have left an indelible impression on me.

When I was twenty years old I decided to return to the United States for a better education. My parents' friend, G.G. Brown, Dean of the School of Engineering, University of Michigan, told my parents I would be welcome to stay with him and his family. At that time I knew very little English and had no idea of the cost of living in the United States. In China, I had read that many American students go through college on their own resources. I informed my parents that I would do likewise. I arrived at the Detroit airport on 6 September 1956 with $100, which at the time seemed more than adequate. I was somewhat frightened, did not know anyone, and communication was difficult.

Ting is the eldest son of his family. He has one brother, Ting Chao-hua (丁肇華) and one sister, Ting Chao-min (丁肇民). In an interview with China Central Television, he explained that the combination of his siblings' and his name is the first three characters of "中華民國" (Republic of China). His parents named them after the country to commemorate their grandfather, who was a martyr in the Xinhai Revolution.

In 1960, Ting married Kay Louise Kuhne, an architect, and together they had two daughters: Jeanne Ting Chowning and Amy Ting. In 1985, he married Dr. Susan Carol Marks, and they had one son, Christopher, born in 1986.

== Selected publications ==
- Aguilar, M.; et al. (AMS Collaboration) (2019). "Towards Understanding the Origin of Cosmic-Ray Positrons". Phys. Rev. Lett. 122 (4) 041102. Bibcode:2019PhRvL.122d1102A. doi:10.1103/PhysRevLett.122.041102. hdl:11572/226282. PMID 30768313.
- Aguilar, M.; et al. (AMS Collaboration) (2013). "First Result from the AMS on the International Space Station: Precision Measurement of the Positron Fraction in Primary Cosmic Rays of 0.5-350 GeV". Phys. Rev. Lett. 110 (14) 141102. Bibcode:2013PhRvL.110n1102A. doi:10.1103/PhysRevLett.110.141102. hdl:1721.1/81241. PMID 25166975.
- Adriani, O.; et al. (L3 Collaboration) (1992). "Determination of the number of light neutrino species". Phys. Lett. B. 292 (3–4): 463–471. Bibcode:1992PhLB..292..463A. doi:10.1016/0370-2693(92)91204-M. hdl:2066/26827.
- Adeva, B.; et al. (1982). "Measurement of Charge Asymmetry in e^{+} e^{−}→μ^{+}+μ^{−}". Phys. Rev. Lett. 48 (25): 1701–1704. doi:10.1103/PhysRevLett.48.1701.
- Barber, D.P.; et al. (1979). "Tests of quantum chromodynamics and a direct measurement of the strong coupling constant α_{s} at √s=30 GeV". Phys. Lett. B. 89 (1): 139–144. Bibcode:1979PhLB...89..139B. doi:10.1016/0370-2693(79)90092-3.
- Barber, D. P.; et al. (1979). "Discovery of Three-Jet Events and a Test of Quantum Chromodynamics at PETRA". Phys. Rev. Lett. 43 (12): 830–833. Bibcode:1979PhRvL..43..830B. doi:10.1103/PhysRevLett.43.830. S2CID 13903005.
- Aubert, J. J.; et al. (1974). "Experimental Observation of a Heavy Particle J". Phys. Rev. Lett. 33 (23): 1404–1406. Bibcode:1974PhRvL..33.1404A. doi:10.1103/PhysRevLett.33.1404.
- Asbury, J. G.; Becker, U.; Bertram, William K.; Joos, P.; Rohde, M.; Smith, A. J. S.; Jordan, C. L.; Ting, Samuel C. C. (1967). "Leptonic Decays of Vector Mesons: The Branching Ratio of the Electron-Positron Decay Mode of the Rho Meson" (PDF). Phys. Rev. Lett. 19 (15): 869–872. Bibcode:1967PhRvL..19..869A. doi:10.1103/PhysRevLett.19.869. S2CID 198471242.
- Dorfan, D. E.; Eades, J.; Lederman, L. M.; Lee, W.; Ting, C. C. (1965). "Observation of Antideuterons". Phys. Rev. Lett. 14 (24): 1003–1006. Bibcode:1965PhRvL..14.1003D. doi:10.1103/PhysRevLett.14.1003.
- Asbury, J. G.; Becker, U.; Bertram, W. K.; Joos, P.; Rohde, M.; Smith, A. J. S.; Friedlander, S.; Jordan, C.; Ting, C. C. (1967). "Validity of Quantum Electrodynamics at Small Distances". Phys. Rev. Lett. 18 (2): 65–70. Bibcode:1967PhRvL..18...65A. doi:10.1103/PhysRevLett.18.65. S2CID 120873954.

== See also ==
- MIT Physics Department
- List of multiple discoveries
- J/ψ meson
- Alpha Magnetic Spectrometer
