= Huang Wanli =

Chinese hydrologist (1911–2001)

- 黄万里
- Born: August 20, 1911; Pudong, Shanghai, China
- Died: August 27, 2001 (aged 90); Beijing, China
- Resting place: Fenghuangshan Cemetery, #10-8-12, Changping, Beijing, China
- Education: Southwest Jiaotong University; Cornell University; University of Illinois at Urbana–Champaign
- Known for: Opposed the constructions of the Sanmenxia Dam and Three Gorges Dam
- Spouse: Ding Yujuan
- Children: 6
- Scientific career
- Fields: Hydrology, hydraulic engineering
- Workplaces: Tsinghua University

Huang Wanli (simplified Chinese: 黄万里; traditional Chinese: 黃萬里; pinyin: Huáng Wànlǐ; 20 August 1911 − 27 August 2001) was a Chinese hydrologist. Huang was a professor at Tsinghua University from 1953 to 2001.

== Biography ==
Huang was born in Chuansha County, Jiangsu (now Pudong, Shanghai) on 20 August 1911, the fourth of nine children of Huang Yanpei and Wang Jiusi (Chinese: 王纠思). In 1924, he enrolled in Wuxi Industrial School. He entered Tangshan Jiaotong University (now Southwest Jiaotong University) in 1927 and graduated in 1932. After college, he worked as an apprentice engineer at Hangzhou-Zhejiang Railway. In 1934, Huang went to the United States. He received a master's degree from Cornell University in hydrology in 1935 and a doctor of engineering degree from University of Illinois in 1937.

In 1945, Huang became an engineer in China's Ministry of Water Resources. He was the chief engineer and head of the Gansu Water Conservancy Bureau from 1947 till April 1949. He was an adviser of Northeast China Water Conservancy Administration in September 1949. He taught at Tangshan Jiaotong University starting in June 1950, and he was transferred to Tsinghua University in 1953.

In 1957, Huang was labeled a "Rightist" and persecuted by Mao Zedong for his criticism of the Sanmenxia Dam on the Yellow River. Then he was sent to the Poyang Lake, Jiangxi to do hard labor, and was transferred back to Tsinghua University in 1974. During the Cultural Revolution, the students at Tsinghua University paraded him and other "reactionary figures" through the streets and beat them in public. Huang was exonerated by the Tsinghua University Communist Party Committee on February 26, 1980.

On August 27, 2001, Huang died on the campus of Tsinghua University. He was buried on April 5, 2021 with his wife, Ding Yujun, at Fenghuangshan Cemetery, Area 10 Row 8 number 12, Changping District, Beijing, China.

== Personal life ==
Huang was married to Ding Yujun (Chinese: 丁玉隽), daughter of Ding Weifen, a founding father of Kuomintang. They had six children:

- Daughter Huang Qieyuan (Chinese: 黄且圆)
- Son Huang Guanhong (Chinese: 黄观鸿)
- Daughter Huang Wuman (Chinese: 黄无满)
- Son Huang Ertao (Chinese: 黄二陶)
- Son Huang Luchun (Chinese: 黄鲁淳)
- Daughter Huang Xiaolu (Chinese: 黄肖路)
