= Tsun-ying Wong =

Chinese politician

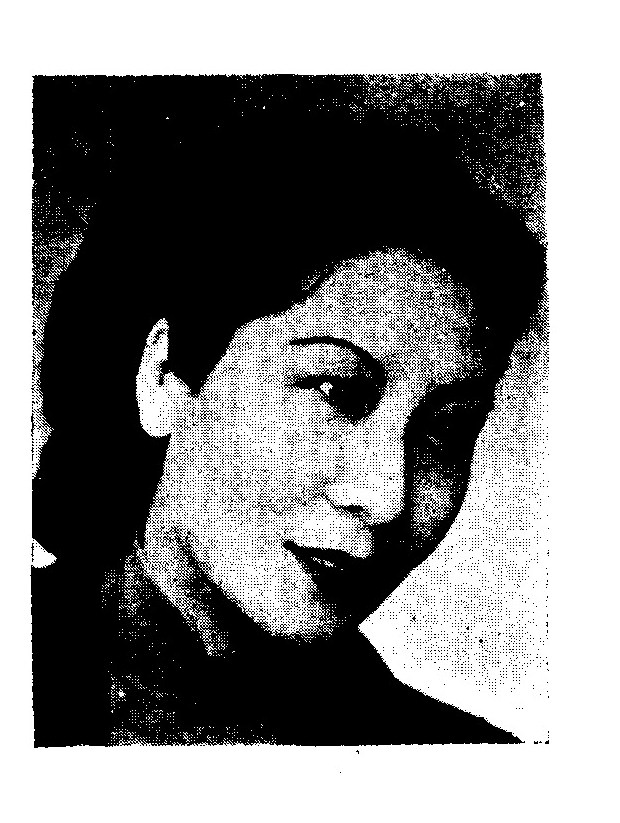
- Wong in 1953

Member of the Legislative Yuan
- In office 1948–1960
- Constituency: Shandong

Personal details
- Born: 1908
- Died: 2 December 1960 (aged 51–52) New York City, United States

Tsun-ying Wong (Chinese: 王隽英; 1908 – 2 December 1960) was a Chinese academic and politician. She was among the first group of women elected to the Legislative Yuan in 1948.

== Biography ==
Wong was born in 1908 and was originally from Panshidian in Shandong province. Her father Wong Yicheng was killed during the 1911 Revolution and she was adopted by the politician Ding Weifen. She earned a bachelor's degree at Yenching University, after which she went to the United States to study for a master's degree at the University of Michigan. While in America she met and married Kuan-hai Ting and the couple had a son, Samuel. Two months after his birth, the couple returned to China, where they had two more children. She became a professor at the Sichuan Provincial Institute of Education and National Institute of Social Education. After joining the Kuomintang she became an alternate member of the party's sixth central committee.

In the 1948 elections for the Legislative Yuan, Wong was a Kuomintang candidate in Shandong, and was elected to parliament. She relocated to Taiwan in 1948 during the Chinese Civil War, where she became an adjunct professor in the Department of Psychology at National Taiwan University and the Taiwan Provincial Institute of Education. She remained a member of parliament until her death in New York City in December 1960.
