= Alpha Magnetic Spectrometer =

Particle detector on the International Space Station

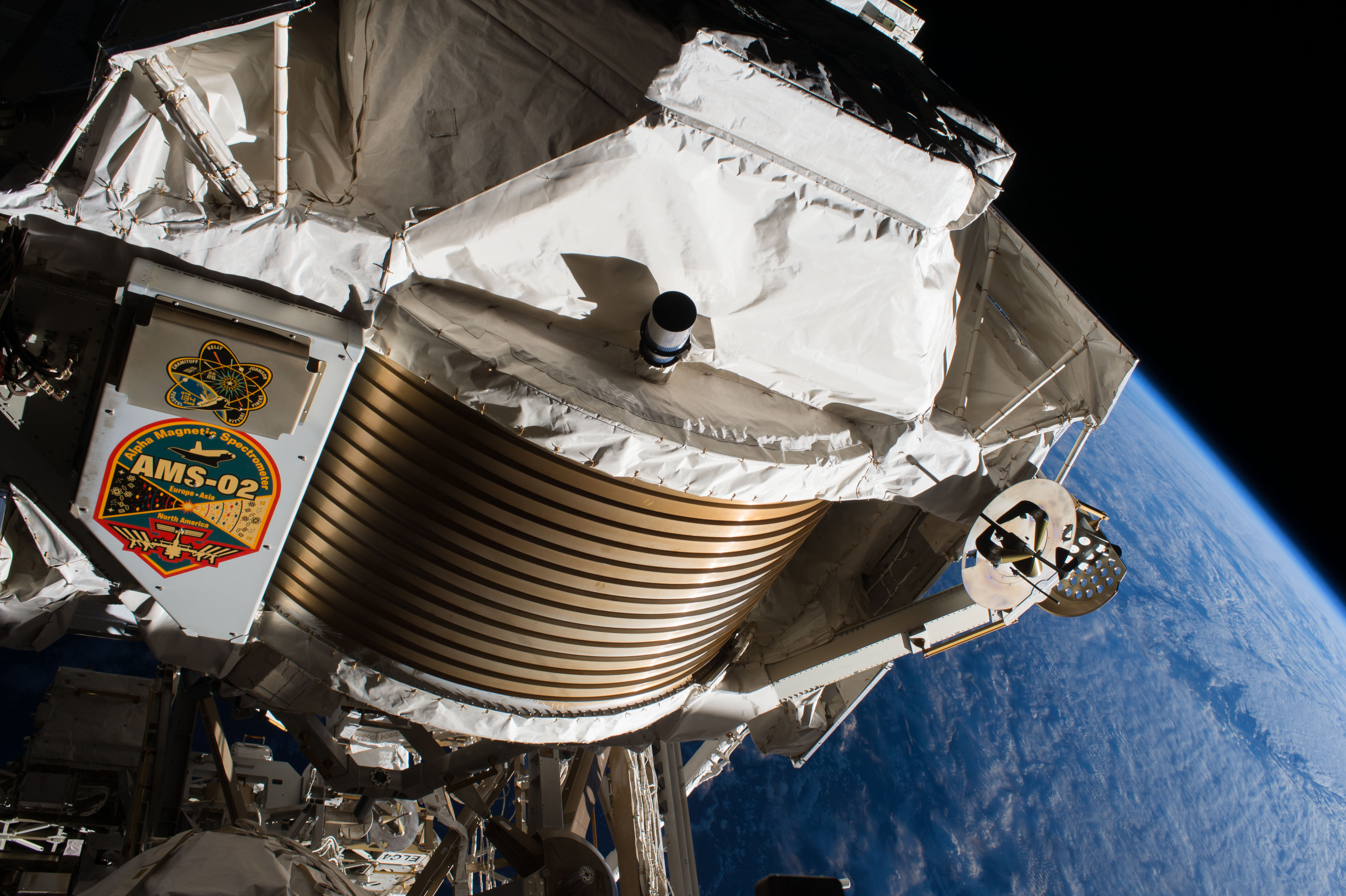
- AMS-02 on the truss, as viewed during an Expedition 50 spacewalk

Module statistics
- Part of: International Space Station
- Launch date: 16 May 2011 13:56:28 UTC
- Launch vehicle: Space Shuttle Endeavour
- Berthed: May 19, 2011; 15 years ago
- Mass: 6,717 kg (14,808 lb)

The Alpha Magnetic Spectrometer (AMS-02) is a particle physics experiment module that is mounted on the International Space Station (ISS). The experiment is a recognized CERN experiment (RE1). The module is a detector that measures antimatter in cosmic rays; this information is needed to understand the formation of the universe and search for evidence of dark matter.

The principal investigator is Nobel laureate particle physicist Samuel Ting. The launch of Space Shuttle Endeavour flight STS-134 carrying AMS-02 took place on May 16, 2011, and the spectrometer was installed on May 19, 2011. By April 15, 2015, AMS-02 had recorded over 60 billion cosmic ray events and 90 billion after five years of operation since its installation in May 2011.

In March 2013, Professor Ting reported initial results, saying that AMS had observed over 400,000 positrons, with the positron to electron fraction increasing from 10 GeV to 250 GeV. (Later results have shown a decrease in positron fraction at energies over about 275 GeV). There was "no significant variation over time, or any preferred incoming direction. These results are consistent with the positrons originating from the annihilation of dark matter particles in space, but not yet sufficiently conclusive to rule out other explanations." The results have been published in Physical Review Letters. Additional data are still being collected.

== History ==
The alpha magnetic spectrometer was proposed in 1995 by the Antimatter Study Group, led by MIT particle physicist Samuel Ting, not long after the cancellation of the Superconducting Super Collider. The original name for the instrument was Antimatter Spectrometer, with the stated objective to search for primordial antimatter, with a target resolution of antimatter/matter ≈10^{−9}. The proposal was accepted and Ting became the principal investigator.

=== AMS-01 ===
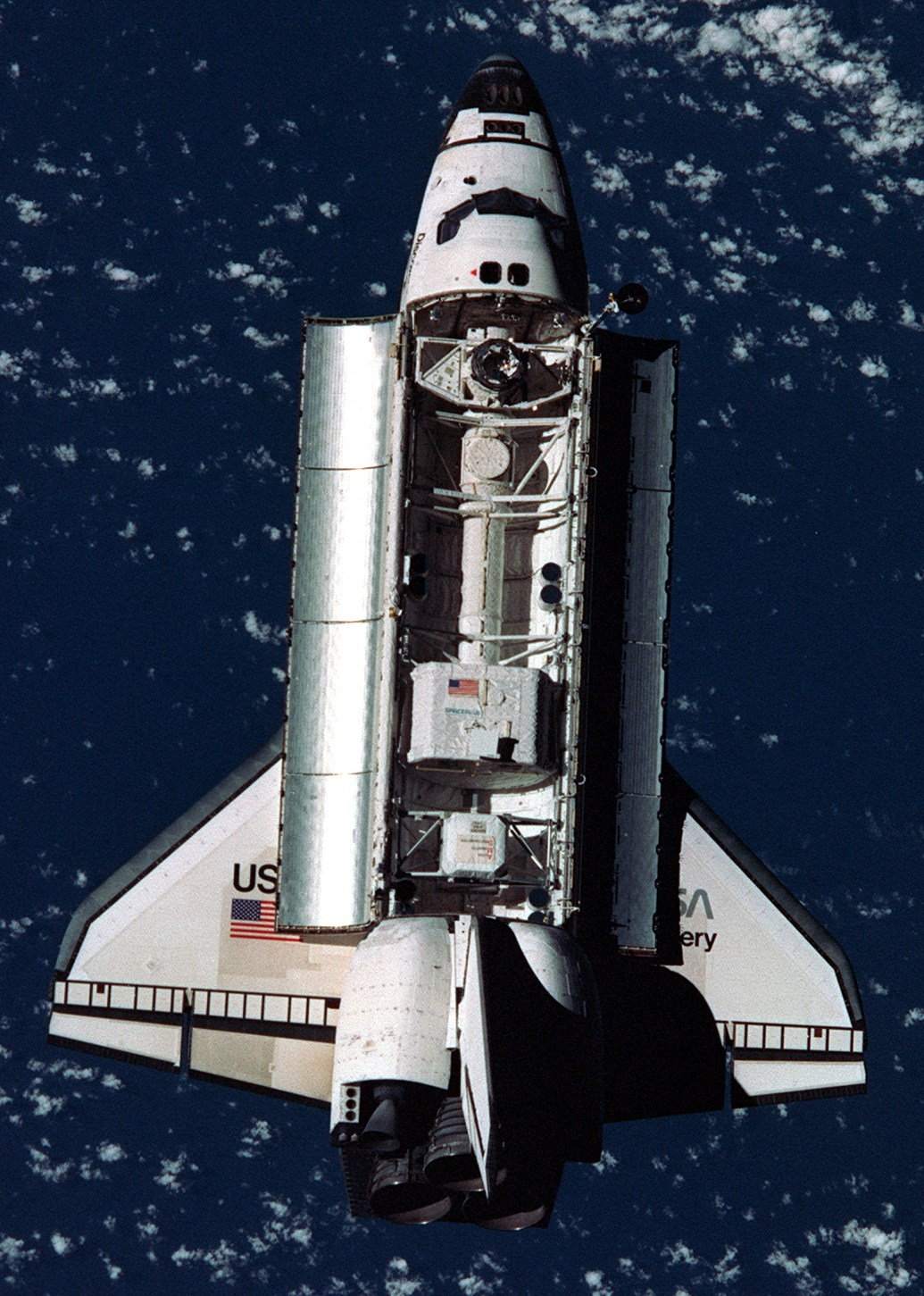
AMS-01 flew in space in June 1998 aboard the Space Shuttle Discovery on STS-91. It is visible near the rear of the payload bay.

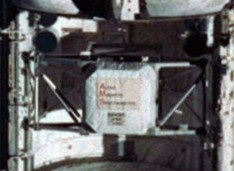
A detail view of the AMS-01 module (center) mounted in the shuttle payload bay for the STS-91 mission.

An AMS prototype designated AMS-01, a simplified version of the detector, was built by the international consortium under Ting's direction and flown into space aboard the Space Shuttle Discovery on STS-91 in June 1998. By not detecting any antihelium, the AMS-01 established an upper limit of 1.1×10^{−6} for the antihelium-to-helium flux ratio and proved that the detector concept worked in space. This shuttle mission was the last shuttle flight to the Mir space station.

=== AMS-02 ===
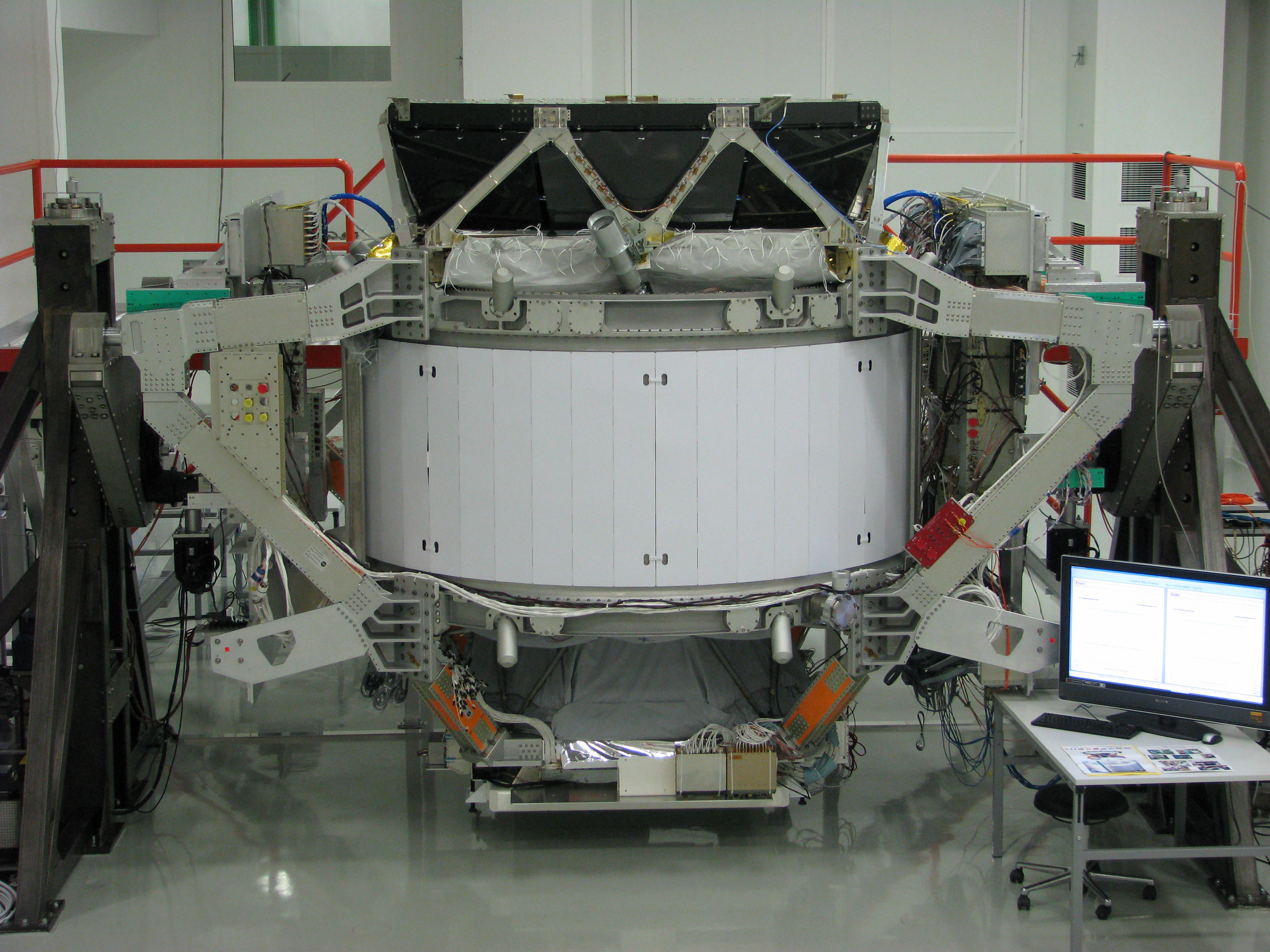
AMS-02 during integration and testing at CERN near Geneva, Switzerland.

After the flight of the prototype, the group, now termed the AMS Collaboration, began the development of a full research system designated AMS-02. This development effort involved the work of 500 scientists from 56 institutions and 16 countries organized under United States Department of Energy (DOE) sponsorship.

The instrument which eventually resulted from a long evolutionary process has been called "the most sophisticated particle detector ever sent into space", rivaling very large detectors used at major particle accelerators, and has cost four times as much as any of its ground-based counterparts. Its goals have also evolved and been refined over time. As built it is a more comprehensive detector which has a better chance of discovering evidence of dark matter along with other goals.

The power requirements for AMS-02 were thought to be too great for a practical independent spacecraft, so AMS-02 was designed to be installed as an external module on the International Space Station and use power from the ISS. The post-Space Shuttle Columbia plan was to deliver AMS-02 to the ISS by space shuttle in 2005 on station assembly mission UF4.1, but technical difficulties and shuttle scheduling issues added more delays.

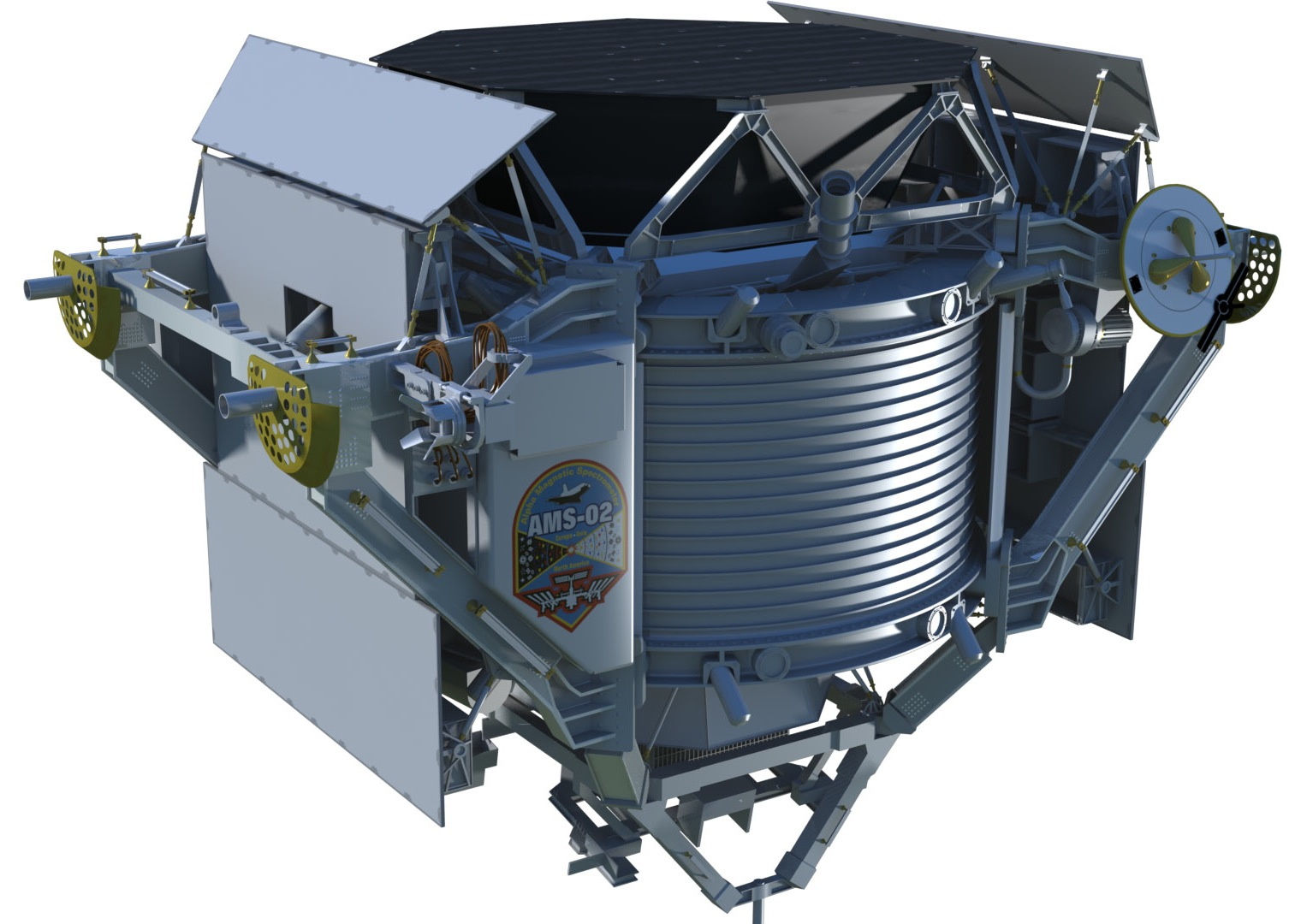
Computer rendering of AMS-02

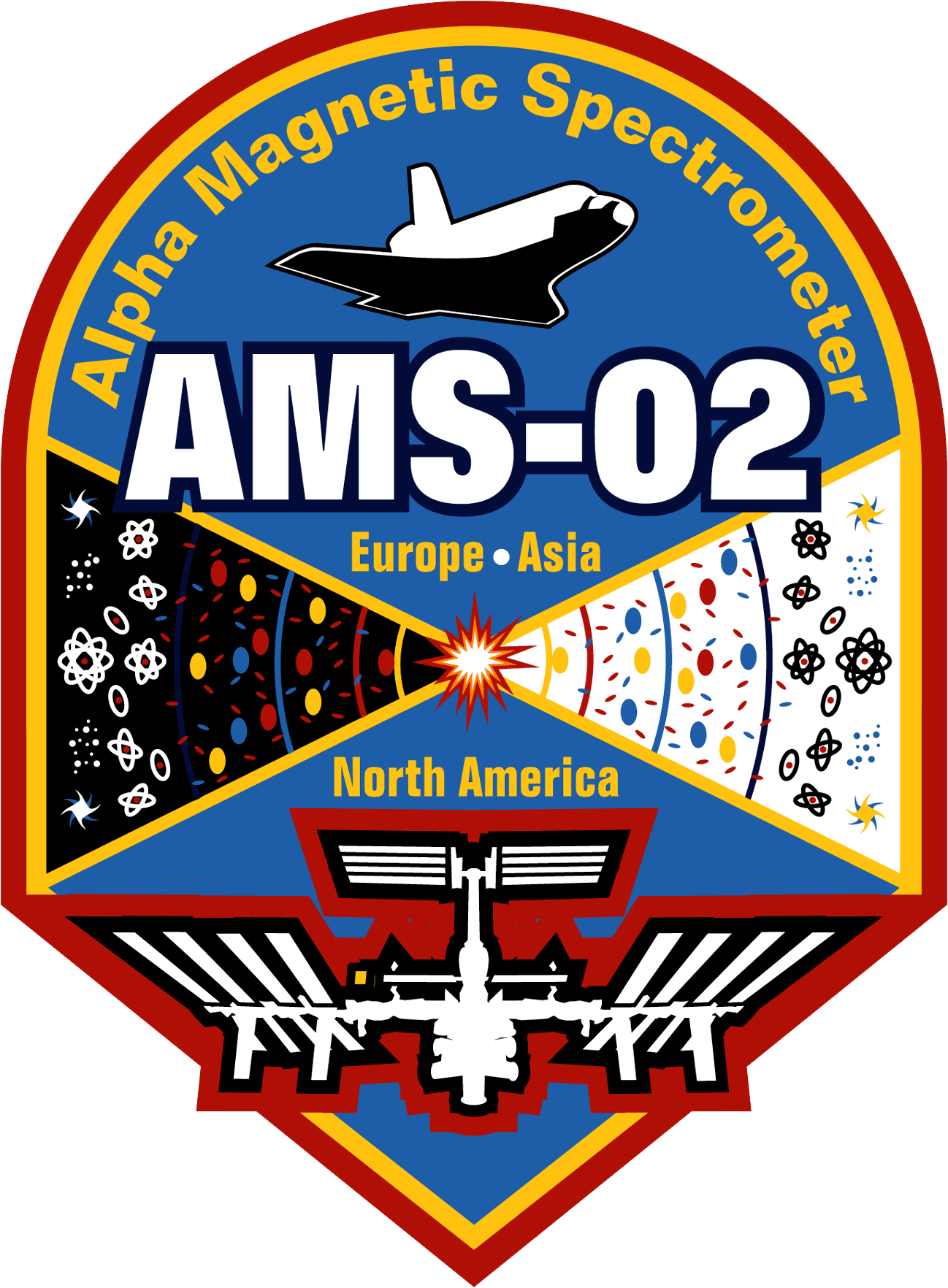
AMS-02 logo

AMS-02 completed final integration and operational testing at CERN in Geneva, Switzerland which included exposure to energetic proton beams generated by the CERN SPS particle accelerator. AMS-02 was then shipped by specialist hauler to ESA's European Space Research and Technology Centre (ESTEC) facility in the Netherlands, arriving February 16, 2010. Here it underwent thermal vacuum, electromagnetic compatibility, and electromagnetic interference testing. AMS-02 was scheduled for delivery to the Kennedy Space Center in Florida, United States, in late May 2010. This was, however, postponed to August 26, 2010 as AMS-02 underwent final alignment beam testing at CERN.

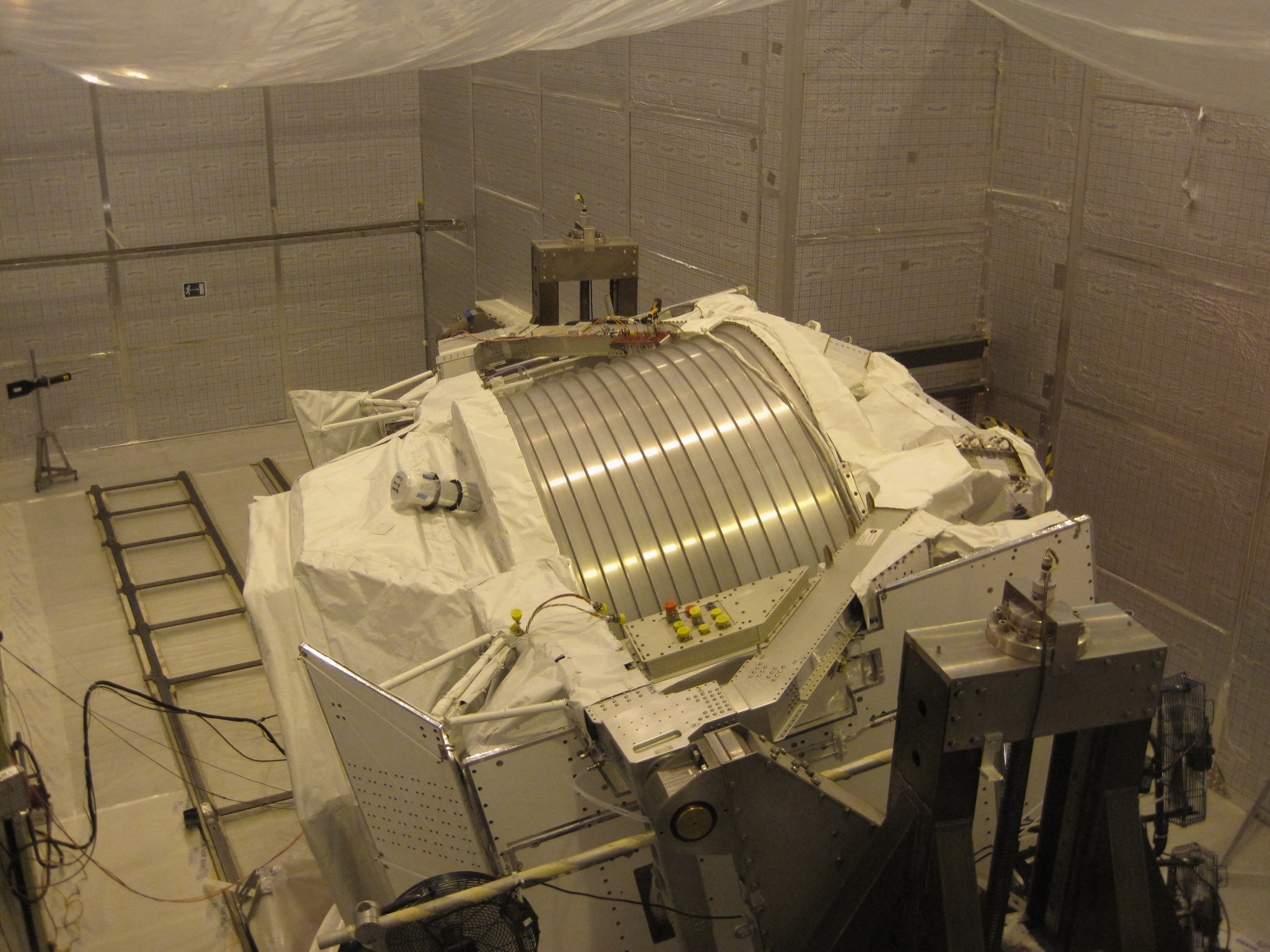
AMS-02 during final alignment testing at CERN just days before being airlifted to Cape Canaveral, Florida.

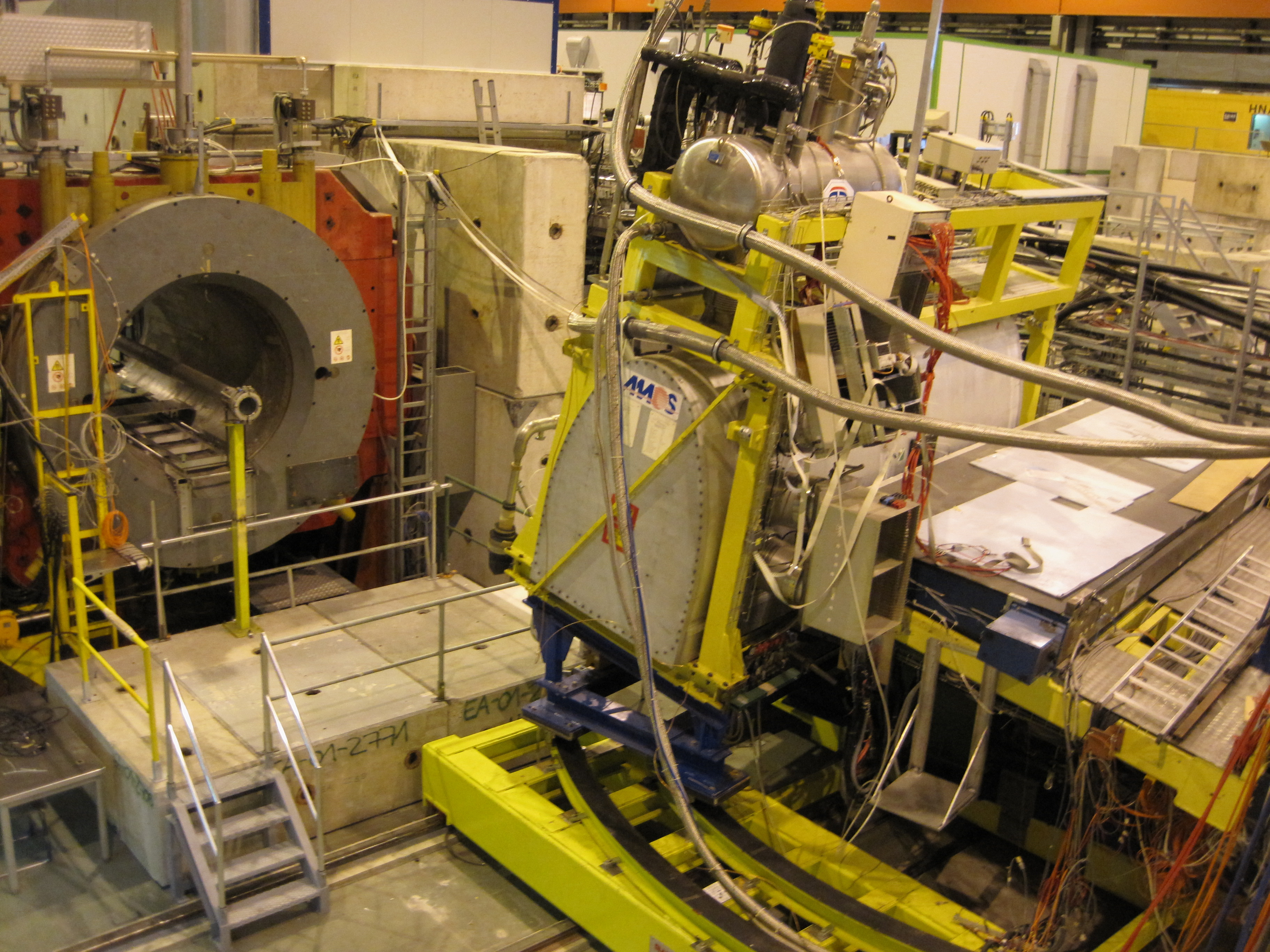
Beamline from SPS feeding 20 GeV positrons to AMS for alignment testing at the time of the picture.

A cryogenic, superconducting magnet system was initially installed on the AMS-02. When the Obama administration extended International Space Station operations beyond 2015, the decision was made by AMS management to exchange the AMS-02 superconducting magnet for the non-superconducting magnet previously flown on AMS-01. Although the non-superconducting magnet has a weaker field strength, its on-orbit operational time at ISS is expected to be 10 to 18 years versus only three years for the superconducting version. In December 2018, it was announced that funding for the ISS had been extended to 2030.

In 1999, after the successful flight of AMS-01, the total cost of the AMS program was estimated to be $33 million, with AMS-02 planned for flight to the ISS in 2003. After the Space Shuttle Columbia disaster in 2003, and after a number of technical difficulties with the construction of AMS-02, the cost of the program ballooned to an estimated $2 billion.

=== Installation on the International Space Station ===
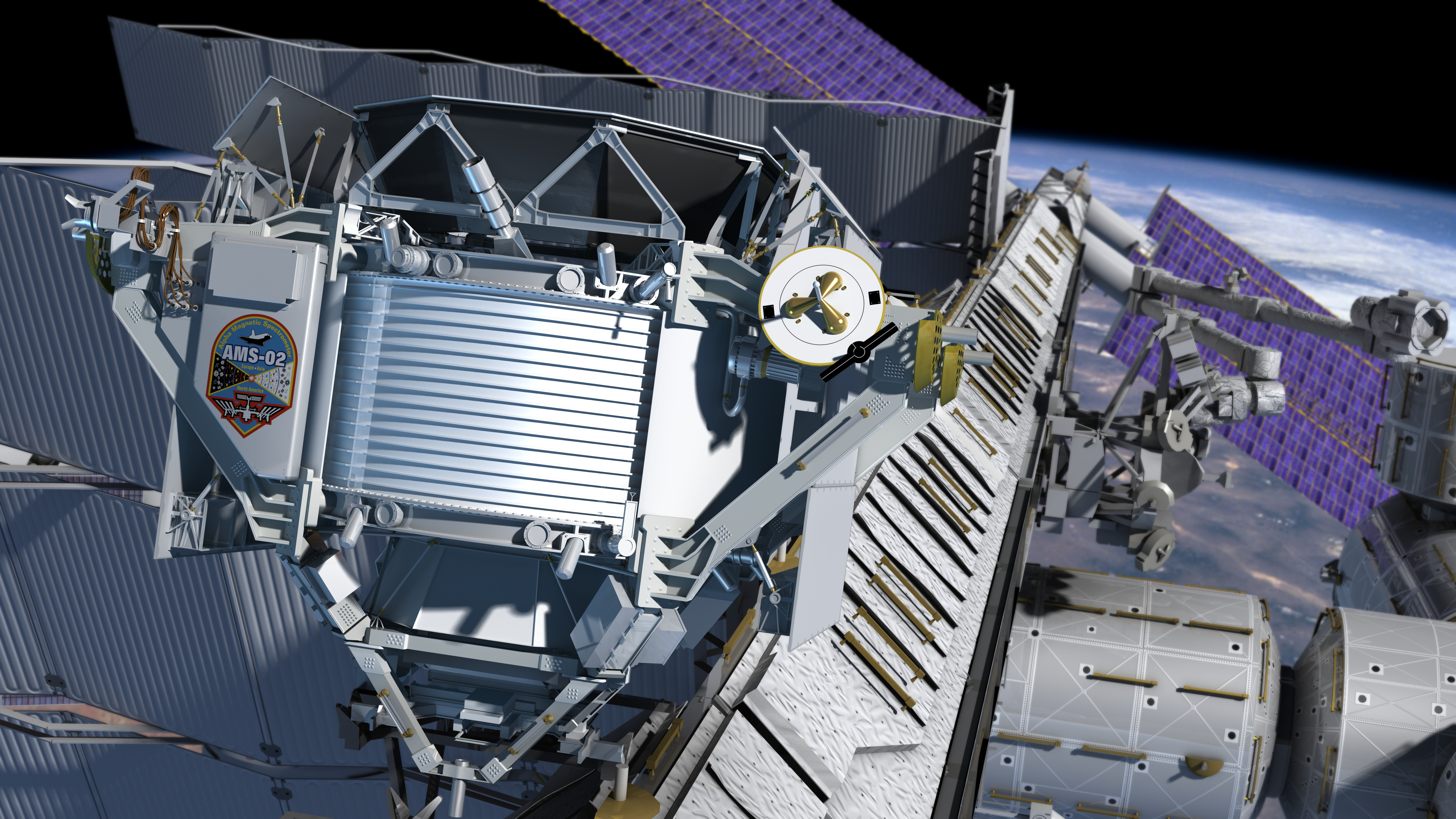
A computer generated image showing AMS-02 mounted to the ISS S3 Upper Inboard Payload Attach Site.

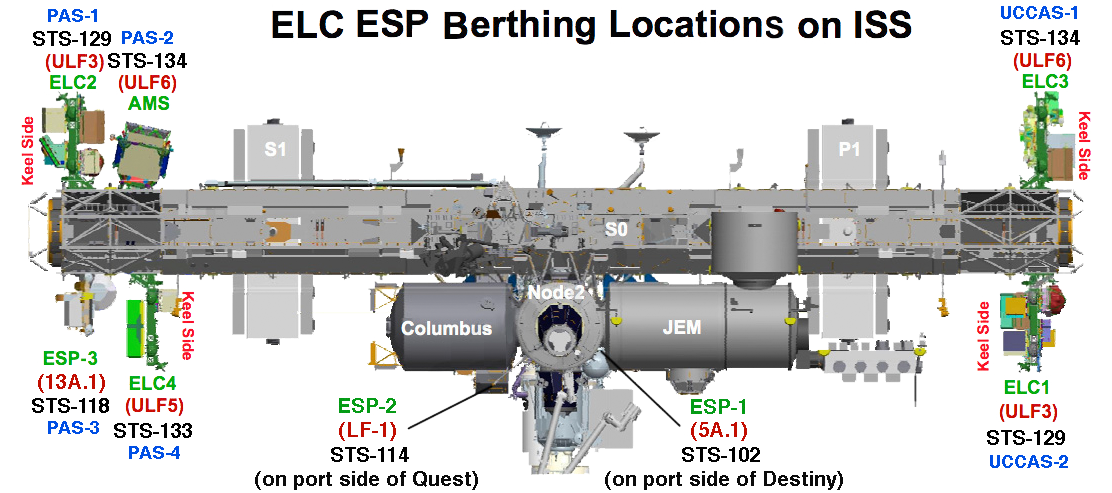
Location of the AMS on the International Space Station (upper left).

For several years it was uncertain if AMS-02 would ever be launched because it was not manifested to fly on any of the remaining Space Shuttle flights. After the 2003 Columbia disaster, NASA decided to reduce shuttle flights and retire the remaining shuttles by 2010. A number of flights were removed from the remaining manifest, including the flight for AMS-02. In 2006, NASA studied alternative ways of delivering AMS-02 to the space station, but they all proved to be too costly.

In May 2008, a bill was sponsored by Rep Mark Udall and twelve other senators, to launch AMS-02 to the ISS on an additional shuttle flight in 2010 or 2011. The bill was passed by the full U.S. House of Representatives on June 11, 2008. The bill then went before the Senate Commerce, Science and Transportation Committee where it also passed. It was then amended and passed by the full Senate on September 25, 2008, and was passed again by the House on September 27, 2008. It was signed into law by President George W. Bush on October 15, 2008. The bill authorized NASA to add another space shuttle flight to the schedule before the space shuttle program was discontinued. In January 2009, NASA restored AMS-02 to the shuttle manifest. On August 26, 2010, AMS-02 was delivered from CERN to the Kennedy Space Center by a Lockheed C-5 Galaxy jet.

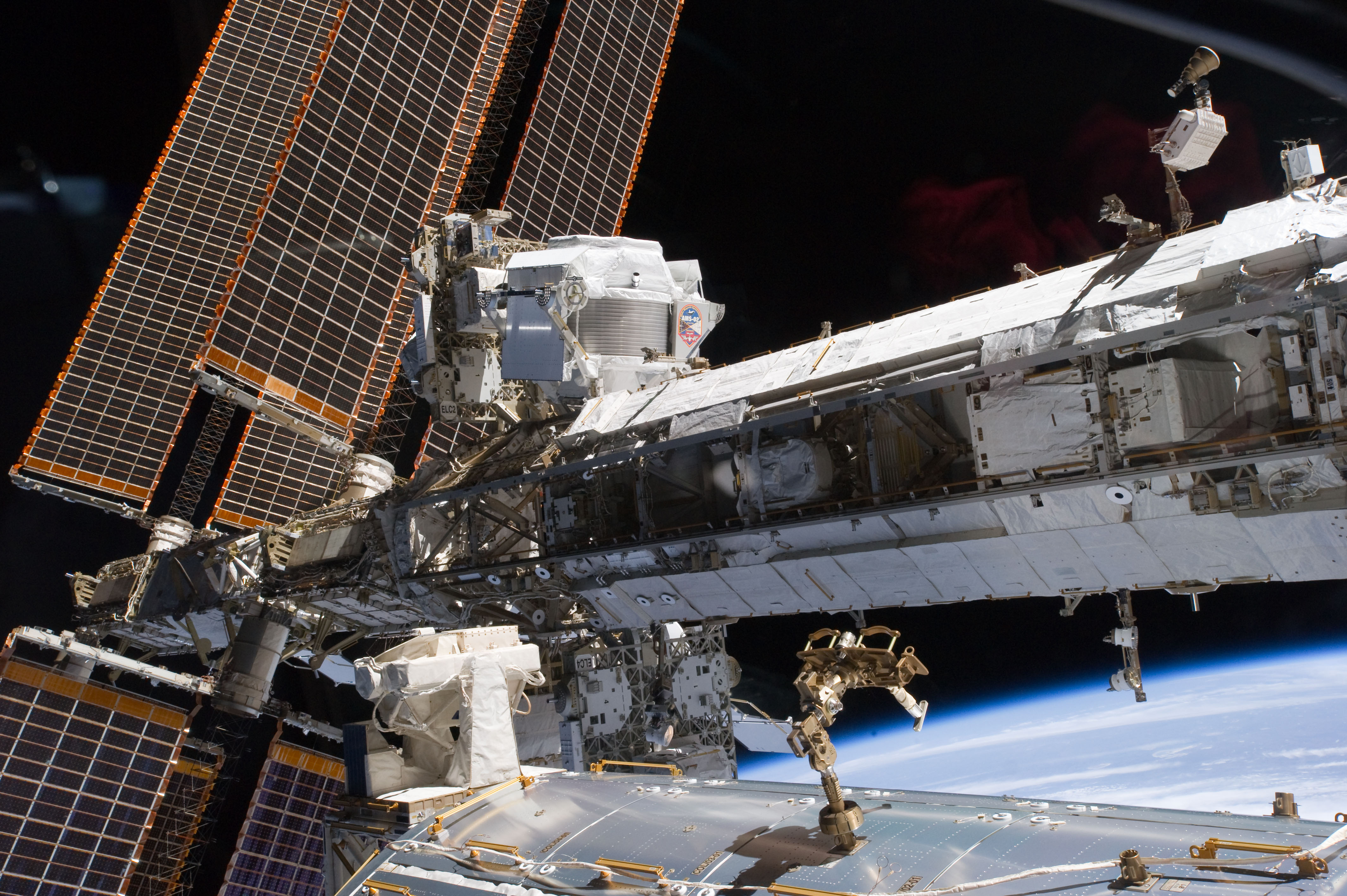
AMS-02 installed on the ISS.

It was delivered to the International Space Station on May 19, 2011, as part of station assembly flight ULF6 on shuttle flight STS-134, commanded by Mark Kelly. It was removed from the shuttle cargo bay using the shuttle's robotic arm and handed off to the station's robotic arm for installation. AMS-02 is mounted on top of the Integrated Truss Structure, on USS-02, the zenith side of the S3-element of the truss.

=== Operations, condition and repairs ===
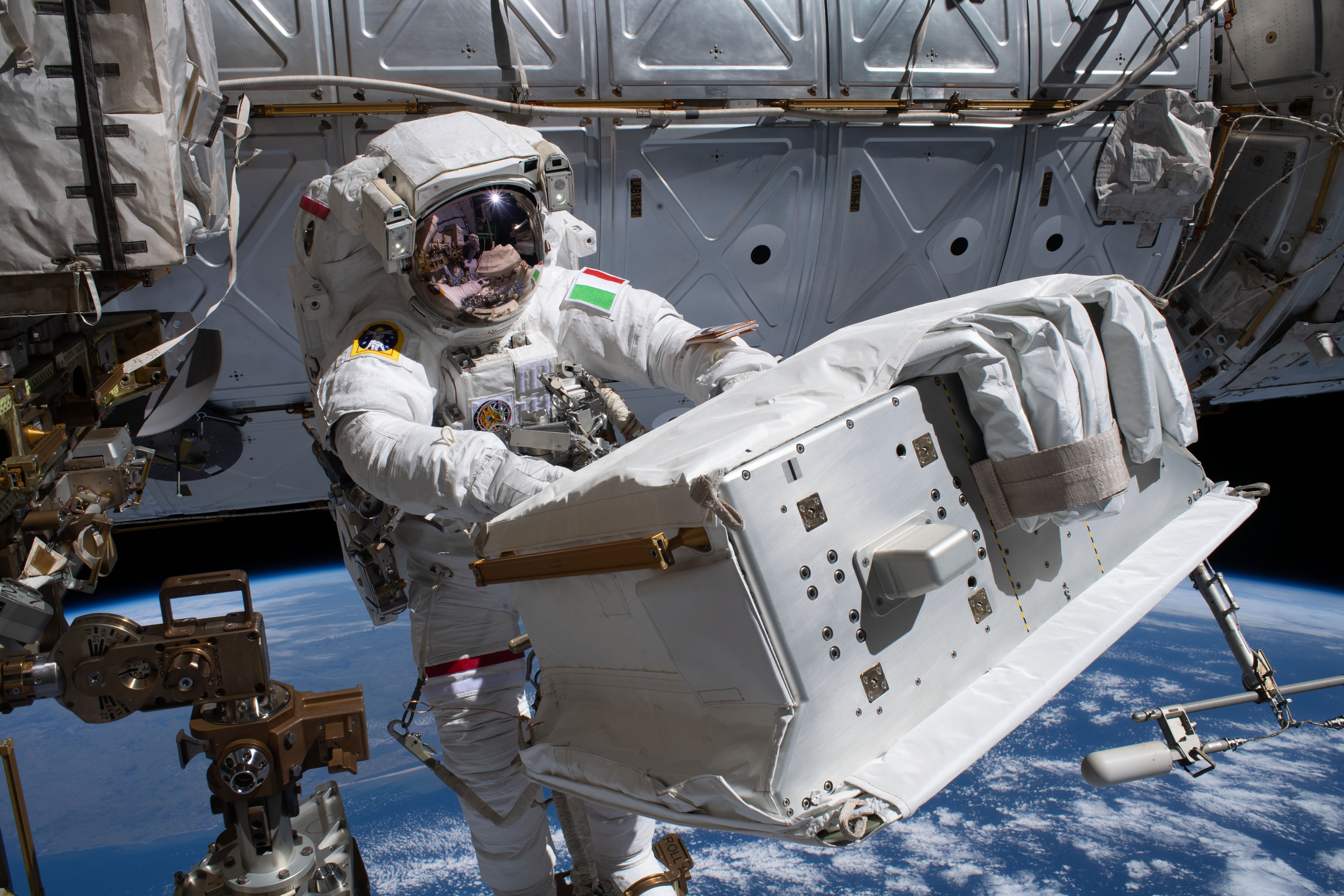
ESA astronaut Luca Parmitano, attached to the Canadarm2 robotic arm, carries the new thermal pump system for AMS

By April 2017, only one of the 4 redundant coolant pumps for the silicon trackers was fully working, and repairs were being planned, despite AMS-02 not being designed to be serviced in space. By 2019, the last pump was being operated intermittently. In November 2019, after four years of planning, special tools and equipment were sent to the ISS for in-situ repairs requiring four EVAs. Liquid carbon dioxide coolant was also replenished.

The repairs were conducted by the ISS crew of Expedition 61. The spacewalkers were the expedition commander and ESA astronaut Luca Parmitano, and NASA astronaut Andrew Morgan. Both of them were assisted by NASA astronauts Christina Koch and Jessica Meir who operated the Canadarm2 robotic arm from inside the Station. The spacewalks were described as the "most challenging since [the last] Hubble repairs".

The entire spacewalk campaign was a central feature of the Disney+ docuseries Among The Stars.

==== Spacewalks ====
===== 1st =====
The first spacewalk was conducted on November 15, 2019. The spacewalk began with the removal of the debris shield covering AMS, which was jettisoned to be destroyed by atmospheric re-entry. The next task was to install three handrails in the vicinity of AMS to prepare for the next spacewalks and remove zip ties on the AMS' vertical support strut. This was followed by the "get ahead" tasks: Parmitano removed the screws from a carbon-fibre cover under the insulation and passed the cover to Morgan to jettison. The spacewalkers also removed the vertical support beam cover. The duration of the spacewalk was 6 hours and 39 minutes.

===== 2nd =====
The second spacewalk was conducted on November 22, 2019. Parmitano and Morgan cut a total of eight stainless steel tubes, including one that vented the remaining carbon dioxide from the old cooling pump. The crew members also prepared a power cable and installed a mechanical attachment device in advance of installing the new cooling system. The duration of the spacewalk was 6 hours and 33 minutes.

===== 3rd =====
The third spacewalk was conducted on December 2, 2019. The crew completed the primary task of installing the upgraded cooling system, called the upgraded tracker thermal pump system (UTTPS), completed the power and data cable connections for the system, and connected all eight cooling lines from the AMS to the new system. The intricate connection work required making a clean cut for each existing stainless steel tube connected to the AMS, then connecting it to the new system through swaging.

The astronauts also completed an additional task to install an insulating blanket on the nadir side of the AMS to replace the heat shield and blanket they removed during the first spacewalk to begin the repair work. The flight control team on Earth activated the power system and confirmed its reception of power and data.

The duration of the spacewalk was 6 hours and 2 minutes.

===== 4th =====
The fourth spacewalk was conducted on January 25, 2020. The astronauts conducted leak checks for the cooling system on the AMS and opened a valve to pressurize the system. Parmitano found a leak in one of the AMS's cooling lines. The leak was fixed during the spacewalk. Preliminary testing showed the AMS was responding as expected.

Ground teams worked to fill the new AMS thermal control system with carbon dioxide, allowed the system to stabilize, and powered on the pumps to verify and optimize their performance. The tracker, one of several detectors on the AMS, began collecting science data again before the end of the week after the spacewalk.

The astronauts also completed an additional task to remove degraded lens filters on two high-definition video cameras.

The duration of the spacewalk was 6 hours and 16 minutes.

== Specifications ==
- Mass: 7,500 kilograms (16,500 lb)
- Structural material: Stainless steel
- Power: 2,500 W
- Internal data rate: 7 Gbit/s
- Data rate to ground: 2 Mbit/s (typical, average)
- Primary mission duration: 10 to 18 years
- Design life: 3 years.
- Magnetic field intensity: 0.15 tesla produced by a 1,200 kg (2,600 lb) permanent neodymium magnet
- Original superconducting magnet: 2 coils of niobium-titanium at 1.8 K producing a central field of 0.87 tesla (not used in the actual device)
- AMS-02 flight magnet changed to non-superconducting AMS-01 version to extend experiment life and to solve reliability problems in the operation of the superconducting system

About 1,000 cosmic rays are recorded by the instrument per second, generating about one GB/s of data. This data is filtered and compressed to about 300 kbit/s for download to the operation center POCC at CERN.

A mockup of the machine is present inside the operations center at CERN.

== Design ==
The detector module consists of a series of detectors that are used to determine various characteristics of the radiation and particles as they pass through. Characteristics are determined only for particles that pass through from top to bottom through each of the instrument’s nine unique detectors. If a cosmic particle fails to be measured by all nine detectors, its data is not stored. Particles that enter the detector at any other angles are rejected. From top to bottom the subsystems are identified as:

- Transition radiation detector measures the velocities of the highest energy particles;
- Upper time of flight counter, along with the lower time of flight counter, measures the velocities of lower energy particles;
- Star tracker determines the orientation of the module in space;
- Silicon tracker (9 disks among 6 locations) measures the coordinates of charged particles in the magnetic field;
  - Has 4 redundant coolant pumps
- Permanent magnet bends the path of charged particles so they can be identified;
- Anti-coincidence counter rejects stray particles that enter through the sides;
- Ring imaging Cherenkov detector measures velocity of fast particles with extreme accuracy;
- Electromagnetic calorimeter measures the total energy of the particles.

=== Layer-0 (L0) Upgrade ===
AMS-02 had an initial planned 3-year mission. However, owing to its unique capability of distinguishing matter from anti-matter by measuring the charge sign from track deflection within its magnetic field, the AMS Collaboration made an upgrade proposal in December 2021 to enhance the capability of this silicon tracker for up to the whole life of the ISS, that currently extends to 2030 at least. The US Department of Energy together with NASA approved the mission in March 2023. The proposed upgrade involves installation of an additional, new large (8 m² of sensors) silicon tracker layer (Layer-0) - along with associated thermal radiators - on the top of the existing instrument's 6 m² of sensors, which is expected to increase particle detection acceptance by 300% and extend energy range of positron flux measurement from 1.4 to 2 TeV, while reducing the error by a factor of two compared to current data.

The new L0 tracker layer, 2.6 m (8.5 ft) in diameter, 30 cm (0.98 ft) thick and weighing 250 kg (550 lb), has an octagonal carbon frame and is meant to be installed on the topmost part of the existing detector installed on the ISS. The L0 layer consists of two planes and each plane is made up of 36 ladders with 8, 10 or 12 SSDs (silicon strip detectors) in each ladder and the detectors in the two planes are rotated at 45° to each other. The silicon strips were produced by Hamamatsu (Japan), assembled into ladders at IHEP in Beijing, shipped to INFN Perugia in Italy for joining together to form a quarter plane and finally, eight quarters were combined together at CERN. The new layer is being designed to fit into the trunk of a SpaceX Dragon 2 for eventual launch to ISS.

The L0 first detector prototype was readied in July 2022 by a joint Italian and Chinese team in INFN Perugia. In January 2024, a prototype of the power-distribution radiator (PDS), manufactured by aerospace company AIDC in Taiwan, was delivered to CERN for tests. Following the first qualification model in late 2023, the actual full-size qualification model was initiated by AMS team under chief engineer, Corrado Gargiulo of CERN. Following assembly by May 2025, CERN teams started metrology, vibroacoustic and random-vibration tests, in collaboration with INFN laboratories in Italy, to validate the detector’s structural integrity and behaviour under simulated launch conditions. The tests were conducted with support of ALCA Space, a Vicenza-based company that built the vacuum chamber, at the premises of Space Industries (Turin).

As of August 2026, the verification procedures were successfully completed and officially certified as ready for launch. L0 has since been shipped to CERN for final calibration activities involving exposure to high-energy proton beams from the Super Proton Synchrotron to ensure the highest measurement accuracy when operating in orbit. Once calibration is completed, L0 will be shipped to the Kennedy Space Center, from where it is planned to be launched in 2027.

== Scientific goals ==
The AMS-02 uses the unique environment of space to advance knowledge of the Universe and lead to the understanding of its origin by searching for antimatter, dark matter and measuring cosmic rays.

=== Antimatter ===
Experimental evidence indicates that our galaxy is made of matter; however, scientists believe there are about 100–200 billion galaxies in the observable Universe and some versions of the Big Bang theory of the origin of the Universe require equal amounts of matter and antimatter. Theories that explain this apparent asymmetry violate other measurements. Whether or not there is significant antimatter is one of the fundamental questions of the origin and nature of the Universe. Any observations of an antihelium nucleus would provide evidence for the existence of antimatter in space. In 1999, AMS-01 established a new upper limit of 10^{−6} for the antihelium/helium flux ratio in the Universe. AMS-02 was designed to search with a sensitivity of 10^{−9}, an improvement of three orders of magnitude over AMS-01, sufficient to reach the edge of the expanding Universe and resolve the issue definitively.

=== Dark matter ===
The visible matter in the Universe, such as stars, adds up to less than 5 percent of the total mass that is known to exist from many other observations. The other 95 percent is dark, either dark matter, which is estimated at 20 percent of the Universe by weight, or dark energy, which makes up the balance. The exact nature of both still is unknown. One of the leading candidates for dark matter is the neutralino. If neutralinos exist, they should be colliding with each other and giving off an excess of charged particles that can be detected by AMS-02. Any peaks in the background positron, antiproton, or gamma ray flux could signal the presence of neutralinos or other dark matter candidates, but would need to be distinguished from poorly known confounding astrophysical signals.

=== Strangelets ===
Six types of quarks (up, down, strange, charm, bottom and top) have been found experimentally; however, the majority of matter on Earth is made up of only up and down quarks. It is a fundamental question whether there exists stable matter made up of strange quarks in combination with up and down quarks. Particles of such matter are known as strangelets. Strangelets might have extremely large mass and very small charge-to-mass ratios. It would be a totally new form of matter. AMS-02 may determine whether this extraordinary matter exists in our local environment.

=== Space radiation environment ===
Cosmic radiation during transit is a significant obstacle to sending humans to Mars. Accurate measurements of the cosmic ray environment are needed to plan appropriate countermeasures. Most cosmic ray studies are done by balloon-borne instruments with flight times that are measured in days; these studies have shown significant variations. AMS-02 operates on the ISS, gathering a large amount of accurate data and allowing measurements of the long term variation of the cosmic ray flux over a wide energy range, for nuclei from protons to iron. In addition to understanding the radiation protection required for astronauts during interplanetary flight, this data will allow the interstellar propagation and origins of cosmic rays to be identified.

== Results ==
In February 2013, Samuel Ting reported that in its first 18 months of operation AMS had recorded 25 billion particle events including nearly eight billion fast electrons and positrons. The AMS paper reported the positron-electron ratio in the mass range of 0.5 to 350 GeV, providing evidence about the weakly interacting massive particle (WIMP) model of dark matter.

On March 30, 2013, the first results from the AMS experiment were announced by the CERN press office. The first physics results were published in Physical Review Letters on April 3, 2013. A total of 6.8 million positron and electron events were collected in the energy range from 0.5 to 350 GeV. The positron fraction (of the total electron plus positron events) steadily increased from energies of 10 to 250 GeV, but the slope decreased by an order of magnitude above 20 GeV, even though the fraction of positrons still increased. There was no fine structure in the positron fraction spectrum, and no anisotropies were observed. The accompanying Physics Viewpoint said that "The first results from the space-borne Alpha Magnetic Spectrometer confirm an unexplained excess of high-energy positrons in Earth-bound cosmic rays." These results are consistent with the positrons originating from the annihilation of dark matter particles in space, but not yet sufficiently conclusive to rule out other explanations. Ting said "Over the coming months, AMS will be able to tell us conclusively whether these positrons are a signal for dark matter, or whether they have some other origin."

On September 18, 2014, new results with almost twice as much data were presented in a talk at CERN and published in Physical Review Letters. A new measurement of positron fraction up to 500 GeV was reported, showing that positron fraction peaks at a maximum of about 16% of total electron+positron events, around an energy of 275 ± 32 GeV. At higher energies, up to 500 GeV, the ratio of positrons to electrons begins to fall again.

The AMS team presented for 3 days at CERN in April 2015, covering new data on 300 million proton events and helium flux. By late 2016, it was reported that AMS-02 had observed over 90 billion cosmic rays. It revealed in December 2016 that it had discovered a few signals consistent with antihelium nuclei amidst several billion helium nuclei. The result remains to be verified, and the team is currently trying to rule out possible contamination.

A study from 2019, using data from NASA's Fermi Gamma-ray Space Telescope discovered a halo around the nearby pulsar Geminga. The accelerated electrons and positrons collide with nearby starlight. The collision boosts the light to much higher energies. Geminga alone could be responsible for as much as 20% of the high-energy positrons seen by the AMS-02 experiment. The AMS-02 on the ISS has, as of 2021, recorded eight events that seem to indicate the detection of antihelium-3.

Over a twelve-year period aboard the ISS, the AMS has accumulated a dataset of more than 230 billion cosmic rays, spanning energies reaching multi-TeV levels. The precise measurements obtained by the magnetic spectrometer enable data presentation with an accuracy approaching ~1%. Particularly significant is the high-energy data regarding elementary particles such as electrons, positrons, protons, and antiprotons, which presents challenges to theoretical frameworks. Additionally, observations of nuclei and isotopes reveal energy dependencies that deviate from theoretical predictions. In a presentation at the 2024 APS April meeting, the AMS collaboration argued that the dataset they have collected necessitates a reevaluation of existing models of the cosmos.

As of April 2026 end, it is reported on the AMS-02 | The Alpha Magnetic Spectrometer Experiment webpage that AMS-02 has observed over 263 billion cosmic ray events till now.

On May 18, 2026 - exactly 15 years from the date of its operationalisation, the AMS-02 has crossed 264 billion cosmic ray events detection milestone.

== See also ==
- List of space telescopes (Astronomical Space Observatories)
- Payload for Antimatter Matter Exploration and Light-nuclei Astrophysics (PAMELA) – an Italian-international cosmic ray mission launched in 2006 with similar goals
- Scientific research on the ISS
