= STS-91 =

Final Space Shuttle mission to the Mir space station

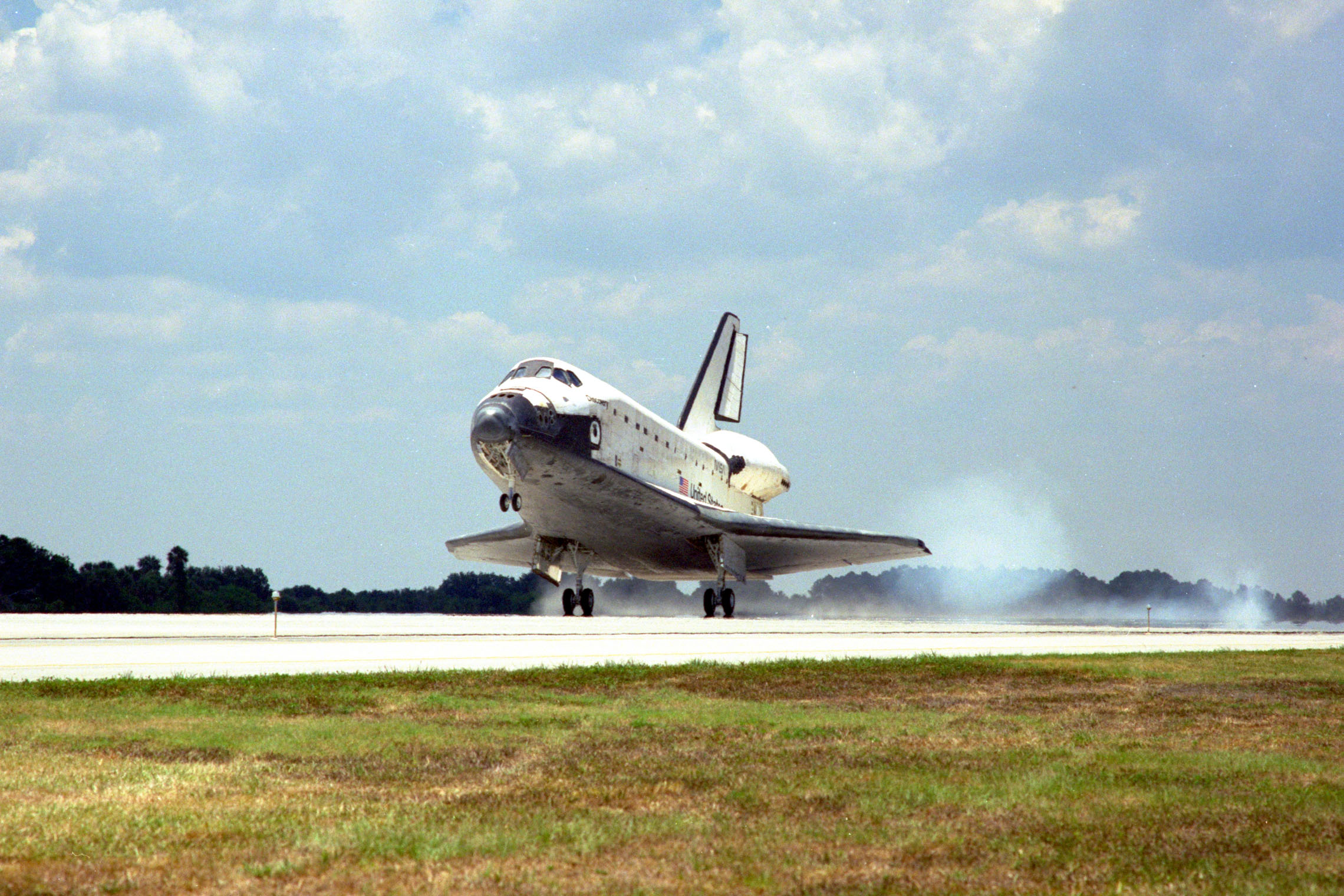
- Discovery lands at Kennedy, concluding the last mission in the Shuttle–Mir program
- Names: Space Transportation System-91
- Mission type: Shuttle-Mir
- Operator: NASA
- COSPAR ID: 1998-034A
- SATCAT no.: 25356
- Mission duration: 9 days, 19 hours, 54 minutes, 2 seconds

Spacecraft properties
- Spacecraft: Space Shuttle Discovery
- Launch mass: 134,434kg
- Landing mass: 117,861 kilograms (259,839 lb)
- Payload mass: 16,537 kilograms (36,458 lb)

Crew
- Crew size: 6 up 7 down
- Members: Charles J. Precourt; Dominic L. Pudwill Gorie; Franklin R. Chang-Diaz; Wendy B. Lawrence; Janet L. Kavandi; Valery Ryumin
- Landing: Andrew S. W. Thomas

Start of mission
- Launch date: 2 June 1998, 22:06:24 UTC
- Launch site: Kennedy, LC-39A

End of mission
- Landing date: 12 June 1998, 18:00:18 UTC
- Landing site: Kennedy, SLF Runway 15

Orbital parameters
- Reference system: Geocentric
- Regime: Low Earth
- Perigee altitude: 350 kilometres (220 mi)
- Apogee altitude: 373 kilometres (232 mi)
- Inclination: 51.7 degrees
- Period: 91.8 min

Docking with Mir
- Docking port: SO starboard
- Docking date: 4 June 1998, 16:58 UTC
- Undocking date: 8 June 1998, 16:01 UTC
- Time docked: 3 days, 23 hours, 3 minutes
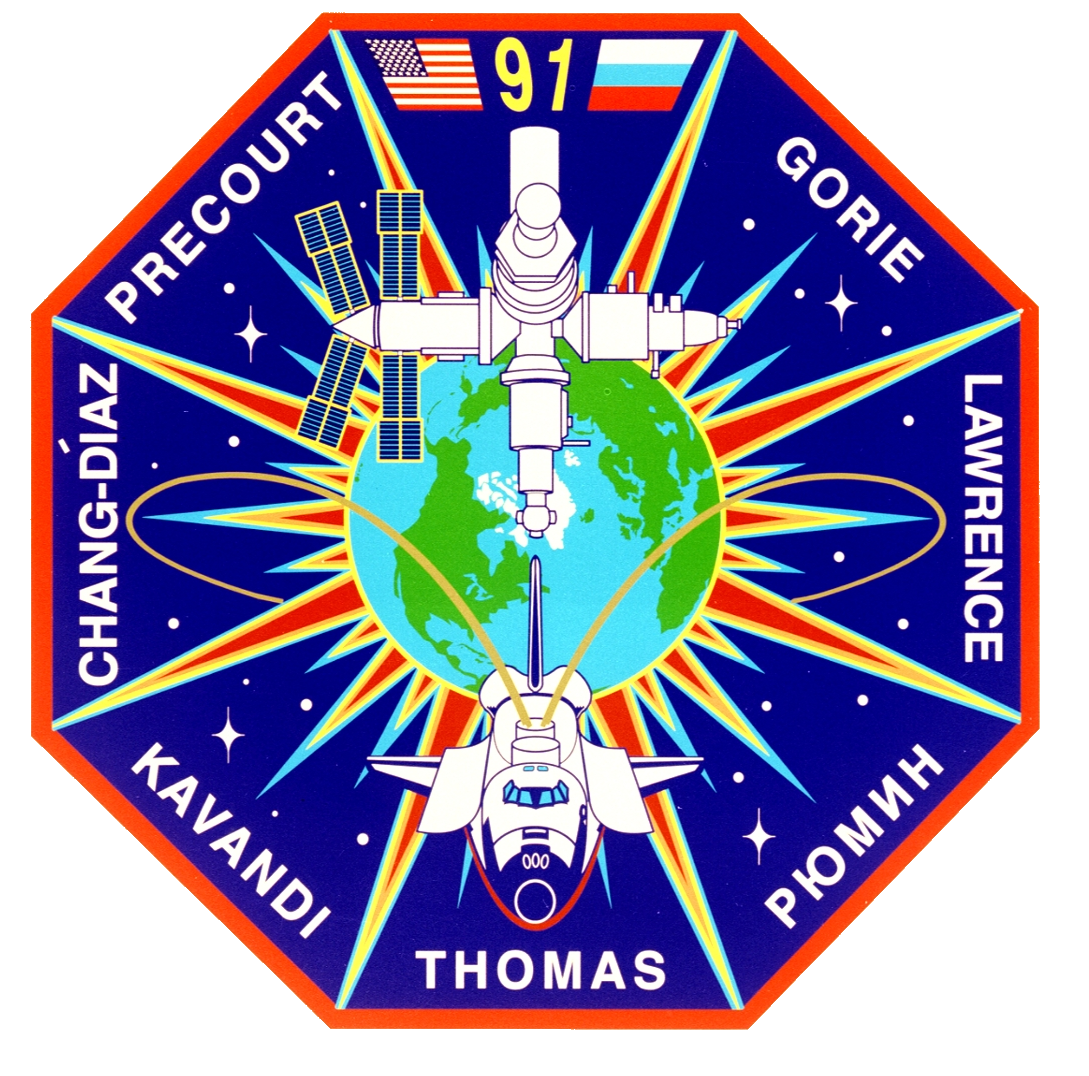
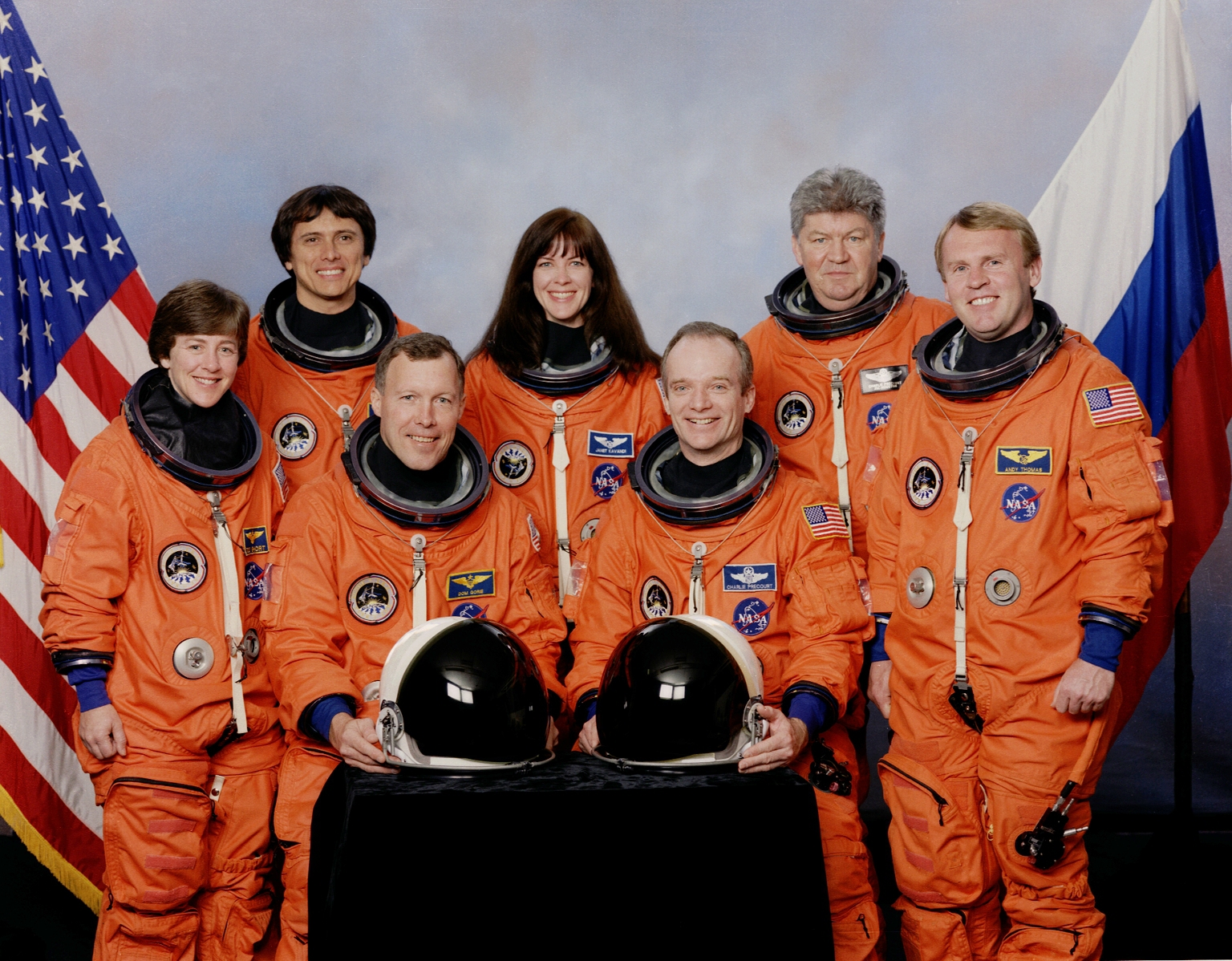
- Left to right – Front: Gorie, Precourt; Back: Lawrence, Chang-Diaz, Kavandi, Ryumin, Thomas Space Shuttle program

STS-91 was the 24th flight of Discovery, and the final Space Shuttle mission to the Mir space station. It was flown by Space Shuttle Discovery, and launched from Kennedy Space Center, Florida, on 2 June 1998.

== Crew ==
Position	Launching Astronaut	Landing Astronaut
Commander	(United States) Charles J. Precourt; Fourth and last spaceflight	
Pilot	(United States) Dominic L. Pudwill Gorie; First spaceflight	
Mission Specialist 1	(United States) / (Costa Rica) Franklin Chang-Díaz; Sixth spaceflight	
Mission Specialist 2 Flight Engineer	(United States) Wendy B. Lawrence; Third spaceflight	
Mission Specialist 3	(United States) Janet L. Kavandi; First spaceflight	
Mission Specialist 4	(Russia) Valery Ryumin, RKA; Fourth and last spaceflight	
Mission Specialist 5	None	(United States) / (Australia) Andy Thomas; EO-25; Second spaceflight

=== Crew seat assignments ===
Seat	Launch	Landing	Seats 1–4 are on the flight deck. Seats 5–7 are on the mid-deck.
1	Precourt		Seats 1–4 are on the flight deck. Seats 5–7 are on the mid-deck.
2	Gorie		Seats 1–4 are on the flight deck. Seats 5–7 are on the mid-deck.
3	Chang-Diaz	Kavandi	Seats 1–4 are on the flight deck. Seats 5–7 are on the mid-deck.
4	Lawrence		Seats 1–4 are on the flight deck. Seats 5–7 are on the mid-deck.
5	Kavandi	Chang-Diaz	Seats 1–4 are on the flight deck. Seats 5–7 are on the mid-deck.
6	Ryumin		Seats 1–4 are on the flight deck. Seats 5–7 are on the mid-deck.
7	Unused	Thomas	Seats 1–4 are on the flight deck. Seats 5–7 are on the mid-deck.

== Mission highlights ==
STS-91 marked the final Shuttle/Mir Docking Mission, as well as the only such docking for Discovery. This Phase 1 Program was a precursor to the International Space Station maintaining a continuous American presence in space and developing the procedures and hardware required for an international partnership in space.

The mission was the first to use the super lightweight external tank (SLWT) which was the same size, at 154 feet (47 m) long and 27 feet (8.2 m) in diameter, as the external tank used on previous launches, but 7,500 pounds (3,400 kg) lighter. The tank was made of an aluminium lithium alloy and the tank's structural design had also been improved making it 30 percent stronger and 5 percent less dense. The walls of the redesigned hydrogen tank were machined in an orthogonal waffle-like pattern, providing more strength and stability than the previous design. These improvements would later provide additional payload capacity to the International Space Station.

Docking of Discovery to Mir, the first for that orbiter, occurred at 16:01 UTC, 4 June 1998 at an altitude of 208 miles. Hatches opened at 2:34 pm the same day. At hatch opening, Andy Thomas officially became a member of Discovery's crew, completing 130 days of living and working on Mir. The transfer wrapped up a total of 907 days spent by seven U.S. astronauts aboard the Russian space station as long-duration crew members. During the next four days, the Mir 25 and STS-91 crews transferred more than 500 kilograms (1,100 lb) of water, and almost 2,130 kilograms (4,700 lb) of cargo experiments and supplies were exchanged between the two spacecraft. During this time, long-term U.S. experiments aboard the Mir were moved into Discovery's middeck locker area and the SPACEHAB single module in the orbiter's payload bay, including the Space Acceleration Measurement System (SAMS) and the tissue engineering co-culture (COCULT) investigations, as well as two crystal growth experiments. The crews also conducted Risk Mitigation Experiments (RMEs) and Human Life Sciences (HLS) investigations. When the hatches closed for undocking at 9:07 am, 8 June, and the spacecraft separated at 12:01 pm that day, the final Shuttle-Mir docking mission was concluded and Phase 1 of the International Space Station (ISS) program came to an end.

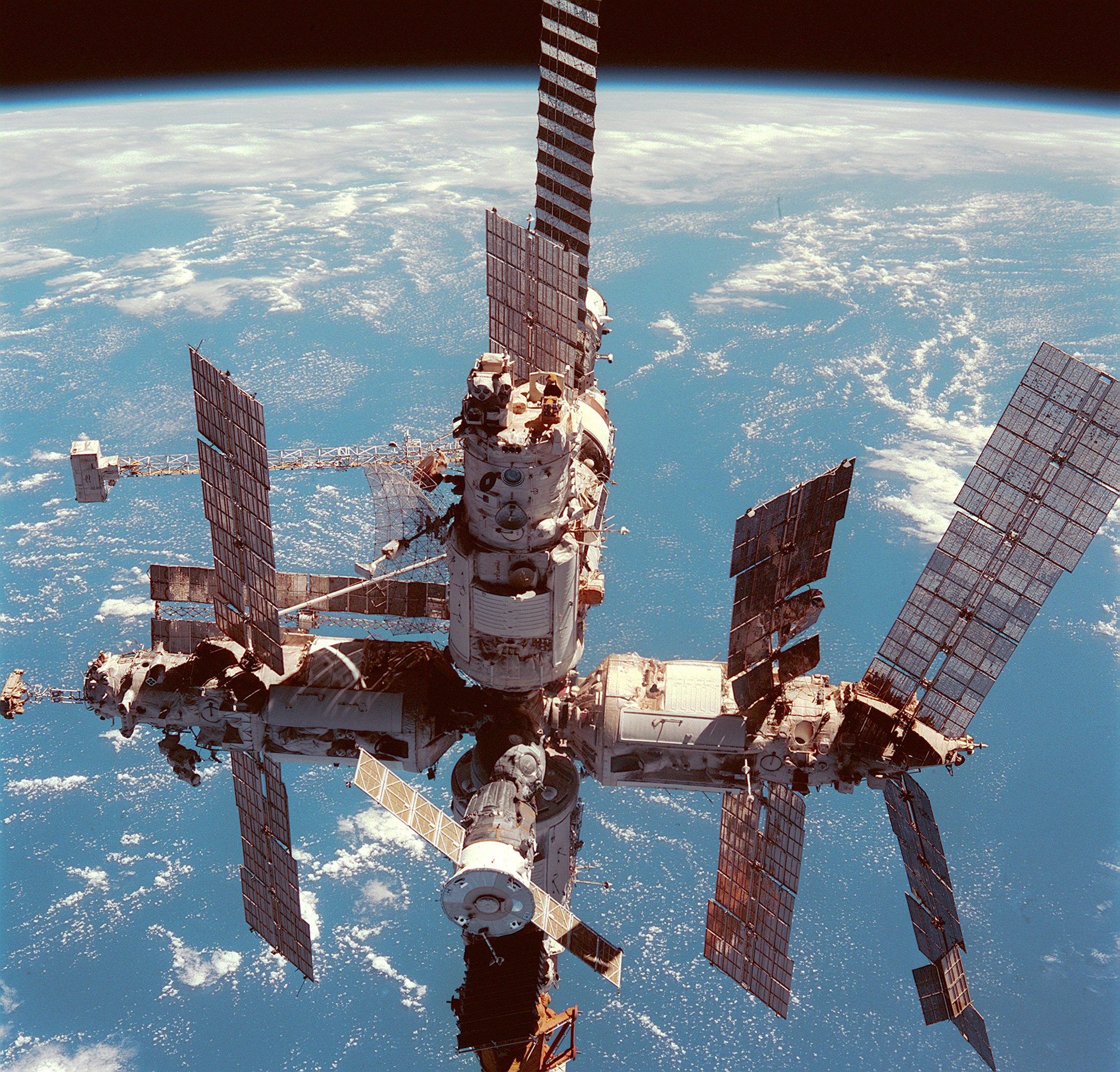
Mir as seen from Discovery after undocking

STS-91 also carried a prototype of the Alpha Magnetic Spectrometer (AMS) into space. The AMS, designed to look for dark and missing matter in the universe, was powered up on Flight Day 1. Data originally planned to be sent to ground stations through Discovery's K_{u}-band communications system was recorded on board because of a problem with the K_{u}-band system that prevented it from sending high-rate communications, including television signals, to the ground. The system was able to receive uplink transmissions. On 3 June 1998 the crew was able to set up a bypass system that allowed AMS data to be downlinked via S-band/FM communications when the orbiter came within range of a ground station. Data that could not be recorded by ground stations was recorded on board throughout the mission.

The K_{u}-band system failure was determined to be located in a component that was not accessible to the crew. The failure prevented television transmission throughout the mission. Television broadcasts from Mir were prevented by a problem between a Russian ground station and the mission control center outside Moscow, limiting communications to audio only on NASA television.

Other experiments conducted by the Shuttle crew during the mission included a checkout of the orbiter's robot arm to evaluate new electronics and software and the Orbiter Space Vision System for use during assembly missions for the ISS. Also on board in the payload bay were eight Get Away Special experiments, while combustion, crystal growth and radiation monitoring experiments were conducted in Discovery's mid-deck crew cabin area.

== See also ==
- List of human spaceflights
- List of Space Shuttle missions
- Outline of space science
