= List of zero-gravity indicators =

This is a list of documented zero-gravity indicators (also known as free-fall indicators) that have been used on space missions. The list includes indicators that have been publicly documented by space agencies or reported by independent sources. It is not intended to be exhaustive.

Image	Mission	Year	Spacecraft	Zero-gravity indicator	Source
	Vostok 1	1961	Vostok 3KA	a pencil	
	Soyuz 31	1978	Soyuz 7K-T	Sandmännchen doll, Matryoshka doll, Mishka toy (mascot for the 1980 Summer Olympics)	
	Soyuz 36	1980	Soyuz 7K-T	Rabbit toy	
Richard N. Richards on the flight deck of Columbia during STS-28. Floating next to him is a tiger plush toy.	Columbia STS-28	1989	Space Shuttle	Truman the Tiger plush (mascot of the University of Missouri athletics team).	
	Soyuz TM-16	1993	Soyuz TM	Monkey toy	
	Discovery STS-63	1995	Space Shuttle	Magellan T. Bear (teddy bear)	
Cosmonaut Yury V. Usachev in his living quarters aboard Russia's Mir Space Station with a floating teddy bear toy on a string in the back.	Soyuz TM-23	1996	Soyuz TM	Paddington Bear toy	
	Soyuz TM-25	1997	Soyuz TM	Hein Blöd (plush from German Käptn Blaubär TV series)	
	Endeavour STS-88	1998	Space Shuttle	Pluto (toy dog)	
	Discovery STS-124	2008	Space Shuttle	Buzz Lightyear toy	
	Discovery STS-119	2009	Space Shuttle	Snowman toy	
	Endeavour STS-134	2011	Space Shuttle	Krtek the Little Mole plush	
	Soyuz TMA-22	2011	Soyuz TMA-M	Red Angry Birds plush	
	Soyuz TMA-04M	2012	Soyuz TMA-M	Smokey Bear plush	
Crew of Soyuz TMA-06 in front of their spacecraft, one of them holding up a hippopotamus plush wearing a spacesuit.	Soyuz TMA-06M	2012	Soyuz TMA-M	Hippopotamus plush	
	Soyuz TMA-07M	2012	Soyuz TMA-M	Klyopa (Clown toy, named after the Egyptian Pharaoh Cleopatra)	
	Soyuz TMA-12M	2014	Soyuz TMA-M	Cheetah plush, Tiger plush (to commemorate International Tiger Day 2014)	
	Soyuz TMA-13M	2014	Soyuz TMA-M	Maus plush, Giraffiti (giraffe plush)	
	Soyuz TMA-15M	2014	Soyuz TMA-M	Olaf plush	
	Soyuz TMA-16M	2015	Soyuz TMA-M	Snowman plush	
	Soyuz TMA-17M	2015	Soyuz TMA-M	R2-D2 plush	
	Soyuz TMA-20M	2016	Soyuz TMA-M	Pink Owl plush	
	Soyuz MS-01	2016	Soyuz MS	Rilakkuma plush	
	Soyuz MS-02	2016	Soyuz MS	Model of the Orel (formerly Federation) spacecraft. It features an internal cavity shaped like Yuri Gagarin’s 'Vostok' spacecraft. Inside the cavity was soil from the Gagarin's launch site.	
	Soyuz MS-04	2017	Soyuz MS	Star (emblem of the Children's Cancer Hospital section from the MD Anderson Cancer Center), Dog plush, Girl doll, Boy doll	
	Soyuz MS-05	2017	Soyuz MS	Hand-knitted Gnome doll, Bear plush wearing an outfit in the colors of the Flag of the United States	
	Soyuz MS-07	2017	Soyuz MS	Poodle plush	
	Soyuz MS-08	2018	Soyuz MS	Zabivaka plush (mascot for the 2018 FIFA World Cup)	
Maus and Elefant plush toys wearing astronaut suits	Soyuz MS-09	2018	Soyuz MS	Maus astronaut (second flight), Elefant astronaut plush, and Zabivaka plush (second flight, mascot for the 2018 FIFA World Cup)	
	Soyuz MS-12	2019	Soyuz MS	Aurora (plush baby falcon), Dog plush wearing a spacesuit	
	Soyuz MS-15	2019	Soyuz MS	Suhail plush astronaut	
	Boeing Orbital Flight Test	2019	Boeing Starliner	Snoopy plush	
Anne McClain with Little Earth	SpaceX Demo-1	2019	Crew Dragon	Celestial Buddies Earth plush	
	SpaceX Demo-2	2020	Crew Dragon	Tremor (sequined dinosaur plush)	
	SpaceX Crew-1	2020	Crew Dragon	Grogu plush	
Oleg Novitskiy holds up a small toy cat while wearing a white filter mask over his face	Soyuz MS-18	2021	Soyuz MS	Kitten Woof (from the Soviet animated series "A Kitten Named Woof")	
	SpaceX Crew-2	2021	Crew Dragon	GuinGuin (penguin plush)	
	Inspiration4	2021	Crew Dragon	Jude (plush dog for St. Jude Children’s Research Hospital)	
	Soyuz MS-19	2021	Soyuz MS	Snow Leopard plush, Cheburashka plush, and Galchonok plush (plush bird for charity organization founded by Yulia Peresild)	
	SpaceX Crew-3	2021	Crew Dragon	Pfau (turtle plush)	
	SpaceX Crew-4	2022	Crew Dragon	Zippy (turtle plush) and Etta (monkey plush)	
	Axiom Mission 1	2022	Crew Dragon	Caramel (plush dog)	
	Boeing OFT-2	2022	Boeing Starliner	Jebediah Kerman plush (character from the video game Kerbal Space Program)	
	Soyuz MS-22	2022	Soyuz MS	Cheburashka plush (second flight)	
Artemis I Snoopy zero gravity indicator	Artemis I	2022	Orion	Snoopy (NASA) and Shaun the Sheep (ESA) plushes	
	SpaceX Crew-5	2022	Crew Dragon	Albert Einstein plush doll	
	SpaceX Crew-6	2023	Crew Dragon	Suhail (second flight)	
	Axiom Mission 2	2023	Crew Dragon	GiGi (Build-A-Bear astronaut doll)	
	Axiom Mission 3	2024	Crew Dragon	GiGi (second flight)	
	Polaris Dawn	2024	Crew Dragon	Asteroid (plush Shiba Inu dog)	
	Soyuz MS-26	2024	Soyuz MS	Pink Corgi plush	
	SpaceX Crew-9	2024	Crew Dragon	Aurora (plush baby falcon, second flight)	
	SpaceX Crew-10	2025	Crew Dragon	друг (hand-crocheted Origami paper crane plush)	
	Fram2	2025	Crew Dragon	Polar bear plush (with embroidered Emperor penguin on chest)	
	Axiom Mission 4	2025	Crew Dragon	Joy (plush baby swan)	
	Artemis II	2026	Orion	Rise	
