= Zero-gravity indicator =

Small object used to demonstrate apparent weightlessness in space travel

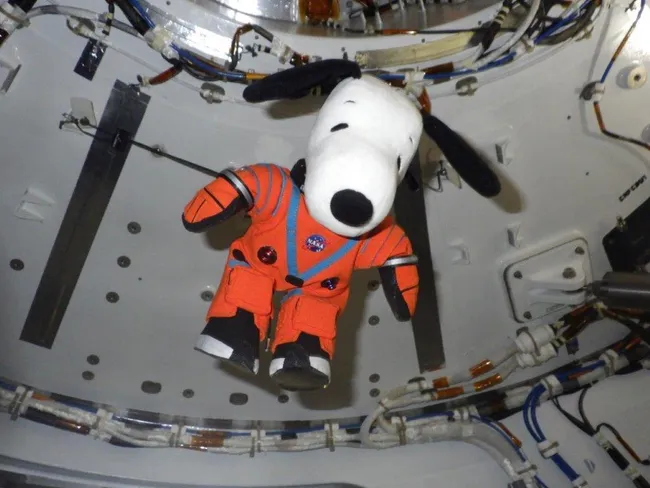
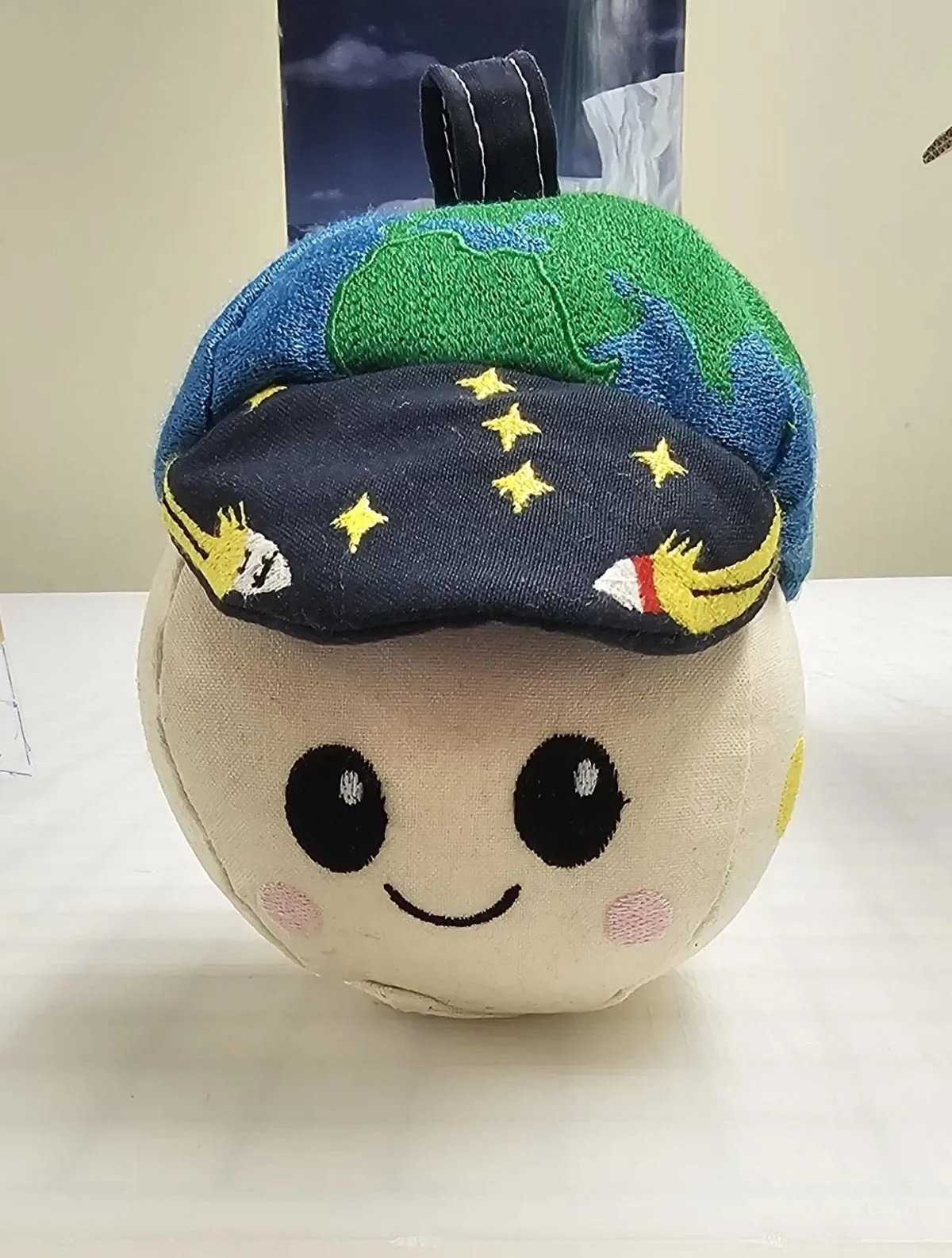
Snoopy and Rise, zero-gravity indicators and mascots for Artemis I and II respectively

Zero-gravity indicators, also known as free-fall indicators, are small objects carried aboard spacecraft and released inside the crew cabin to provide a visual confirmation that the vehicle has entered a microgravity environment. When the spacecraft reaches sustained free fall, the object floats freely, making the transition to weightlessness visible to the crew and, in some cases, to observers via onboard video.

== History ==
The use of small objects to visually demonstrate weightlessness dates to the earliest period of human spaceflight. During the 1961 Vostok 1 mission, Soviet cosmonaut Yuri Gagarin released a pencil inside the spacecraft to confirm the onset of microgravity. Similar objects were subsequently used on later Soviet and Russian missions, where they became a customary means of visually indicating free-fall conditions inside the cabin.

== Contemporary use ==
In modern crewed spaceflight, zero-gravity indicators are typically lightweight, non-hazardous objects selected for use in the confined environment of a spacecraft. They are usually secured during launch and released after orbital insertion or once microgravity has been achieved.

Both government-operated and commercial space missions have continued the practice. Russian Soyuz crews routinely use small suspended objects as weightlessness indicators, while more recent American and international missions have included soft toys or similar items for the same purpose. These indicators are commonly visible during live mission broadcasts.

== Design and operational considerations ==
Zero-gravity indicators have no navigational or scientific function. Their role is limited to providing a clear visual demonstration of microgravity. Objects selected for this purpose are small, lightweight, and constructed of materials that pose no risk to crew or equipment if they float freely inside the spacecraft. In some cases, the indicator may be tethered to prevent it from drifting into controls or out of view.

== See also ==
- List of zero-gravity indicators
