= Rise (zero gravity indicator) =

Artemis II weightlessness indicator

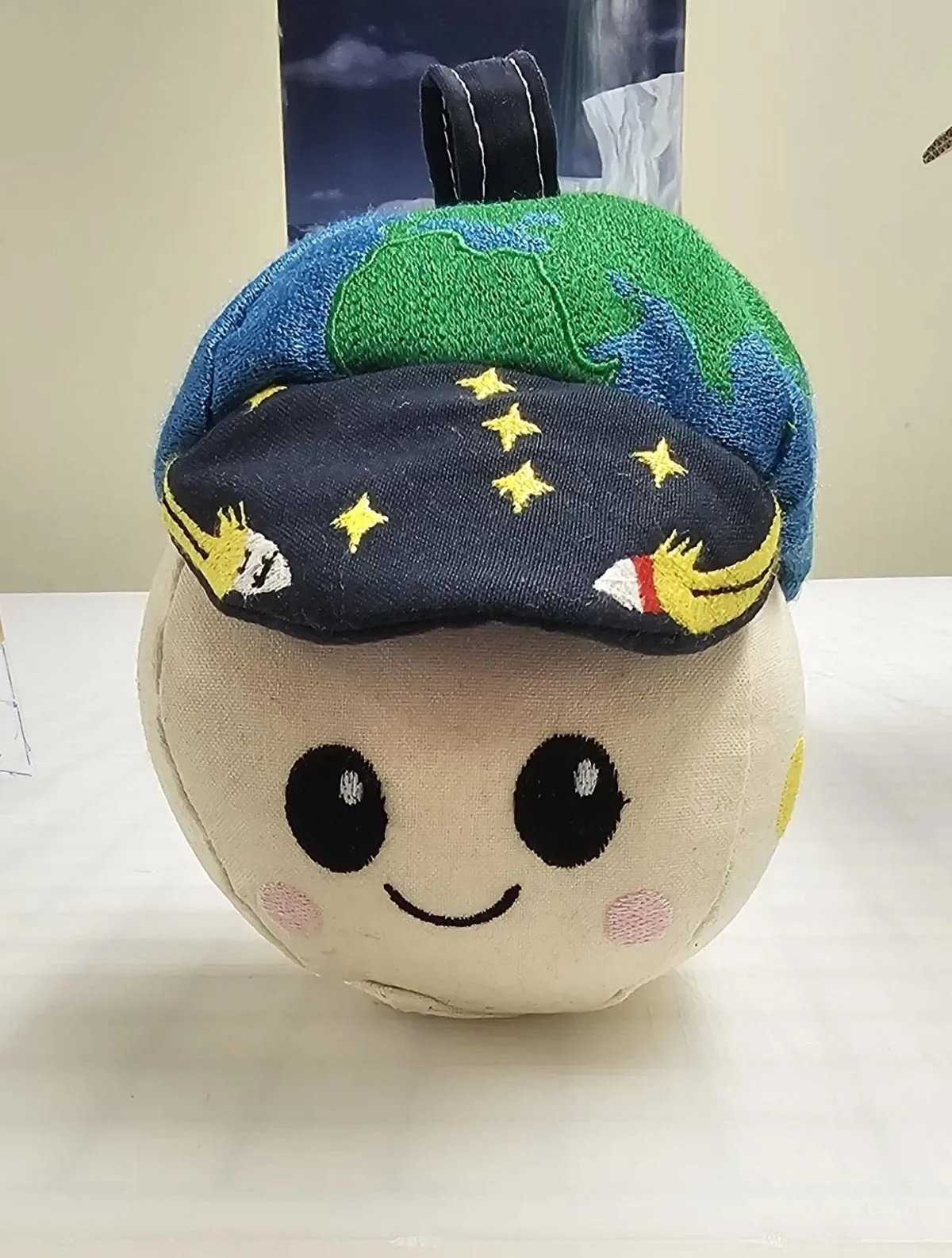
- Type: Stuffed toy
- Invented by: Lucas Ye
- Company: NASA
- Country: United States
- Features: Zippered pocket

"Rise" is a small stuffed toy used as a weightlessness indicator for the Artemis II lunar flyby mission and as a mascot for its crew. The indicator was created based on a design by 8-year-old Californian Lucas Ye, whose work won a NASA-sponsored competition held from March to June 2025. The toy design is inspired by the photograph Earthrise taken by Apollo 8 astronaut William Anders on December 24, 1968, and is copyrighted by NASA.

The toy was manufactured by NASA's Goddard Space Flight Center's Thermal Blanket Laboratory. During its flight, which took place April 1–11, 2026, its pocket contained an SD card containing digital photographs of the 25 child finalists, as well as the names of more than 5.6 million people who received virtual "boarding passes" for the Orion spacecraft as souvenirs.

== History ==
=== Background ===
All NASA missions and crews have their own symbols, usually in the form of emblems and patches. Toys, typically soft, have been used as weightlessness indicators since the first crewed and uncrewed space flights. However, in American spaceflight, this tradition only took hold relatively recently, with the launch of the uncrewed Crew Dragon. For example, during the first flight of the Artemis lunar program, the uncrewed Artemis I mission, which took place from November 16 to December 11, 2022, a specially made Snoopy figurine served as such an indicator.

For the Artemis II mission, it was decided that the zero-gravity indicator would also serve as a mascot for the crew, which included astronauts Christina Koch, Victor Glover, Jeremy Hansen, and Reid Wiseman (the crew commander). Previously, the astronauts themselves chose and took with them on flights toys that were particularly memorable as indicators; NASA mission symbols were also developed internally, often by the astronauts themselves. To select the indicator/mascot for the Artemis I mission, NASA decided to hold an open competition for the best toy design. This was the first time NASA held such a competition.

=== Contest ===
Jeremy Hansen, a member of the Artemis II crew, holds the mascot on March 27, 2026.

The competition was announced on March 7, 2025. Prizes of up to US$1,225 were offered, for a total prize fund of US$23,275. The contest was run by NASA and crowdsourcing company Freelancer.com.

Entries were accepted from March 7 to June 16, 2025. Anyone registered on the Freelancer website could participate. According to the competition's terms, participants were prohibited from using artificial intelligence, and their entries were not allowed to contain NASA or specific country symbols. Participants were required to submit a sketch developed in accordance with the competition's terms; NASA would be responsible for the implementation of their idea.

More than 2,600 applications were received from more than 50 countries. On August 22, 2025, the names of 25 finalists were announced, representing 10 countries in the Americas, Asia, and Europe: three works from Canada, one work each from the United Kingdom, Germany, Colombia, Peru, Singapore, Finland, France, and Japan, and the remaining 14 from the United States. From these works, the Artemis II crew selected the five that the astronauts liked most, from which they chose the winner – the mascot of their flight.

The following works received the highest marks in the Moon Mascot contest:

1. "Rise" is the work of Lucas Ye from Mountain View, California, USA;
2. "Lepus the Moon Rabbit" is a work by Oakville Trafalgar High School from Oakville, Canada;
3. "Creation Mythos" is the work of Joanna Beck from McPherson, Kansas, USA;
4. "Corey the Explorer" by Daniela Colina (Peru);
5. "Big Steps of Little Octopus" is a work by Angelika Iudakova (Finland).

=== Winner ===
The Artemis II crew with their mascot, a zero-gravity indicator, on March 29, 2026.

On March 27, 2026, at a pre-launch ceremony at the Kennedy Space Center, Artemis II commander Reid Wiseman announced the winner of the competition. The winner was 8-year-old Lucas Ye from Mountain View, California.

His Rise mascot features a smiling Moon wearing a baseball cap depicting the Earth's blue-green surface—continents amidst the oceans; the dark blue visor is adorned with the stars of the Orion constellation (referencing the ship's name) with rockets flying toward them, one representing the Apollo program and the other Artemis. The mascot, which represents humanity's view of Earth from space, is inspired by the photograph Earthrise taken by Apollo 8 astronaut William Anders on December 24, 1968. Design elements such as a small image of Neil Armstrong's footprint on the back of the toy pay homage to the Apollo 11 moon landing on July 21, 1969.

Lucas Yeh's family at the Banana Creek observation deck on Orion's launch day, April 1, 2026.

Ye initially wanted to make the mascot in the form of a baby Yoda from Star Wars who would "use his force" when weightlessness set in – but the boy's mother, after consulting with NASA, was convinced that this would violate copyright. Although the competition only required a detailed sketch, Ye, with the help of his family, also built his own "Rise" from a dryer ball. In an interview, Ye said he was surprised and excited that his "Rise" would fly into space. He said he loves rockets, NASA, the Solar System, and exploring space; he dreams of working as an engineer at NASA or becoming an astrophysicist. As a reward, Lucas and his family were invited to the Kennedy Space Center in Florida to watch the launch of the SLS rocket carrying Orion on April 1, 2026; they had a reserved seat, but, as they are not U.S. taxpayers, they paid for the trip themselves.

=== Manufacturing ===
Moon Mascot Ready to Rise with Artemis II

Ye's design for the Rise indicator was a small, spherical, stuffed toy. It was manufactured by NASA's Thermal Blanket Lab at NASA's Goddard Space Flight Center in Greenbelt, Maryland. The toy's zippered pocket contained an SD card containing digital photographs of the 25 finalists, along with the names of the more than 5.6 million people who completed an online form on NASA's website to receive souvenir electronic "boarding passes" for the Artemis II Orion mission.

The mascot was attached to the crew cabin shortly before launch. According to Artemis II commander Reid Wiseman, the zero-gravity indicator will be special for the crew: "In a spacecraft filled with complex hardware to keep the crew alive in deep space, the indicator is a friendly and useful way to highlight the human element that is so critical to our exploration of the universe."

Crew member Christina Koch said: "This little guy, Rise, really resonated with us because the theme is actually the Earthrise photo taken on Apollo 8, which is inspirational to all of us and it is a mission that sort of mirrors our own."

== After the flight ==
Reid Wiseman hugs NASA physician Richard Schering as he exits a helicopter onto the deck of the amphibious transport dock John Murtha on April 10, 2026.

According to NASA protocol, all items in the splashdown Orion crew cabin were to remain in the capsule and be retrieved later by NASA personnel. However, crew captain Reid Wiseman decided to take Rise with him. He took a sealed bag from a survival kit, placed the mascot in it, and then attached the bag to his spacesuit. Thus, the mascot remained with Wiseman while he was evacuated from the capsule and flown by helicopter aboard the amphibious transport dock USS John P. Murtha, while the Artemis II crew was at Naval Air Station North Island, Rise was tethered with a lanyard to Wiseman's drinking bottle. Reid Wiseman wrote on social media: "It's hard not to love this little guy. I can't let Rise out of my sight."

That same day, the successful completion of the Artemis II mission was celebrated at Ellington Field Johnson Space Center, Houston. As the crew took the stage, Wiseman held the flight mascot in his hands.

A few hours later, Wiseman posted a photo of himself with his daughters and the mascot on X, with the caption "Mission accomplished" and three hearts. Jokes have started circulating on social media that "Rise" is the newest member of the Wiseman family and his new child, "Rise Wiseman."

== Viral video ==
On Sunday, April 5, the Artemis II crew gave a joint interview to CNN, which was broadcast live. Rise, which floated in front of the crew during the interview to demonstrate weightlessness, became the centerpiece of the subsequent social media buzz.

Rise during the Artemis II crew's visit to the U.S. Senate, May 12, 2026

An unknown user posted a fragment of the interview online, allegedly filmed on a mobile phone from a television screen, which immediately went viral. Unlike the original NASA and CNN recording, this video shows artifacts such as color distortion and flickering text, including the letters "TAN" and "OW" appearing on the toy's surface.

The video, which garnered over 1.5 million views, was actively commented on by space conspiracy theorists, who claim that the flights are being faked by NASA. The video was seized upon as "proof" that the Artemis II mission was staged, and the interview footage was a fabrication created using green screen technology (which supposedly confirms the "glitch"). Discussions erupted on social media: some were sarcastic and accused NASA of deception, while others tried to find a rational explanation for the interference.

CNN and NASA ignored the case. The press generally noted that various conspiracy theories that had previously existed on the fringes of the internet had entered the mainstream amid growing distrust of government institutions and traditional media. The dissemination of the video and other false information unexpectedly revived old conspiracy theories, most notably the denial of the Apollo 11 Moon landing in 1969.

== Merchandising ==
In late April, shortly after the successful completion of the Artemis II mission, NASA launched an online store, NASA Exchange, dedicated to the expedition. In addition to the toy itself, buyers can order clothing, stickers, magnets, and other souvenirs featuring the mascot. According to NASA, all proceeds will go to support the "morale, well-being, and recreation" of agency employees.

== Gallery ==
Rise at Naval Air Station North Island in California on the day of its return from space.

Rise, attached to Reed Wiseman's wrist, April 11, 2026.

Rise and astronaut Reed Wiseman on stage at Ellington Field Joint Reserve Base.

The Artemis II crew on stage at Ellington Field Joint Reserve Base on April 11, 2026.

"Rise" during Victor Glover's Senate testimony, May 12, 2026

Reid Wiseman shows Rise to Senator Susan Collins, May 12, 2026

Rise during the crew's visit to the Nasdaq Stock Exchange in New York, April 30, 2026.

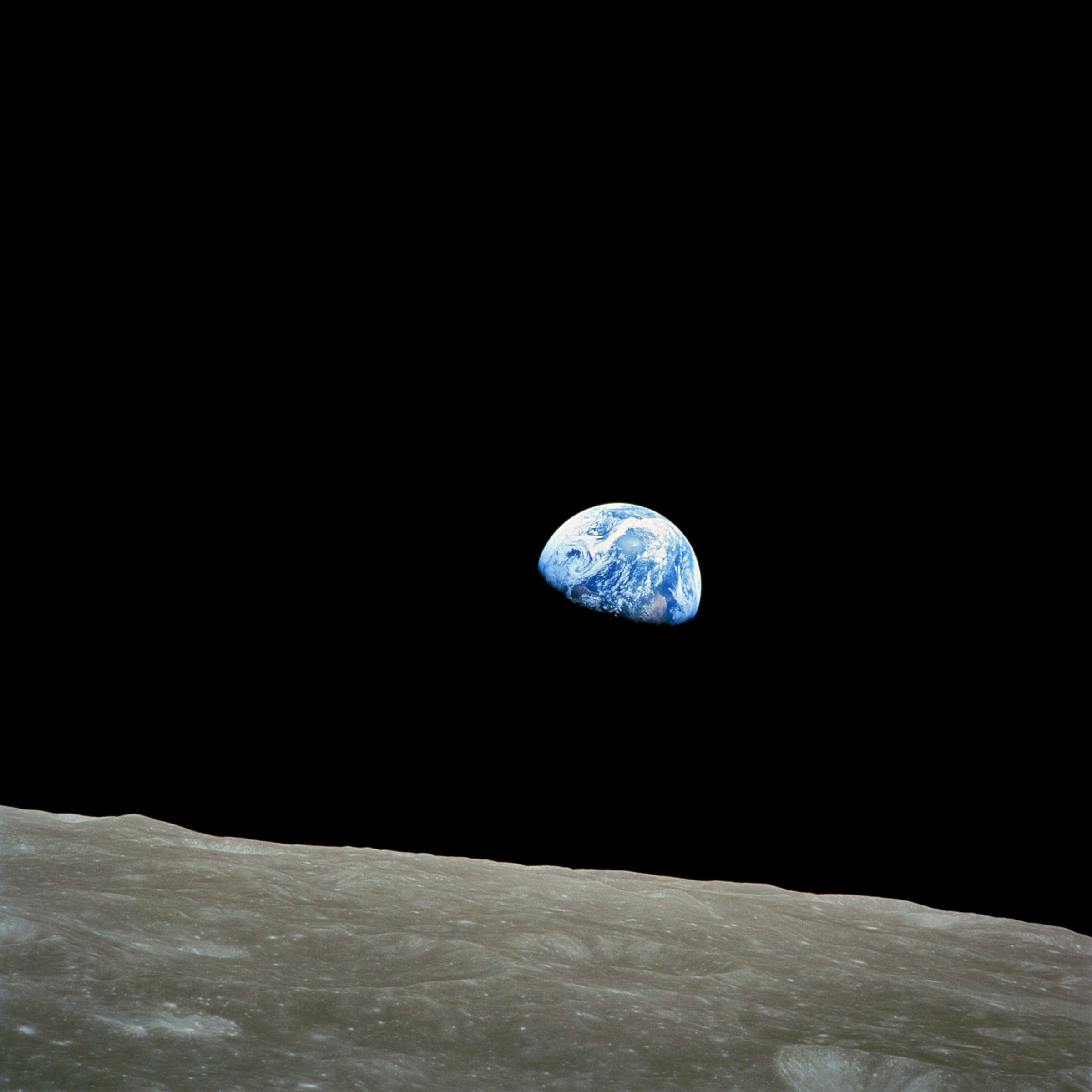
Earthrise, the mascot's namesake, was photographed in 1968 by William Anders during the Apollo 8 mission.
