= Artemis II =

2026 crewed flyby of the Moon

- Earthset, by astronaut Christina Koch aboard Integrity
- Names: Artemis II; Exploration Mission-2 (EM-2)
- Mission type: Crewed lunar flyby
- Operator: NASA
- COSPAR ID: 2026-069A
- SATCAT no.: 68538
- Website: nasa.gov/mission/artemis-ii
- Mission duration: 9 days, 1 hour, 32 minutes and 15 seconds
- Distance travelled: 700,237 mi (1,126,922 km; 608,489 nmi)

Spacecraft properties
- Spacecraft: Orion CM-003 Integrity; ESM-2
- Manufacturer: Orion: Lockheed Martin; ESM: Airbus
- Launch mass: 78,000 lb (35,000 kg)
- Landing mass: 20,500 lb (9,300 kg)

Crew
- Crew size: 4
- Members: Reid Wiseman; Victor Glover; Christina Koch; Jeremy Hansen

Start of mission
- Launch date: April 1, 2026, 22:35:12 UTC (6:35:12 p.m. EDT)
- Rocket: Space Launch System
- Launch site: Kennedy, LC-39B

End of mission
- Recovered by: USS John P. Murtha
- Landing date: April 11, 2026, 00:07:27 UTC (April 10, 5:07:27 p.m. PDT)
- Landing site: Pacific Ocean southwest of San Diego (32.3°N 117.8°W)

Earth orbiter
- Orbital departure: April 2, 2026
- Orbits: 2

Orbital parameters
- Perigee altitude: 119 mi (192 km; 103 nmi)
- Apogee altitude: 43,604 mi (70,174 km; 37,891 nmi)
- Inclination: 28.5°

Flyby of Moon
- Closest approach: April 6, 2026, 23:00 UTC
- Distance: 4,067 mi (6,545 km; 3,534 nmi)
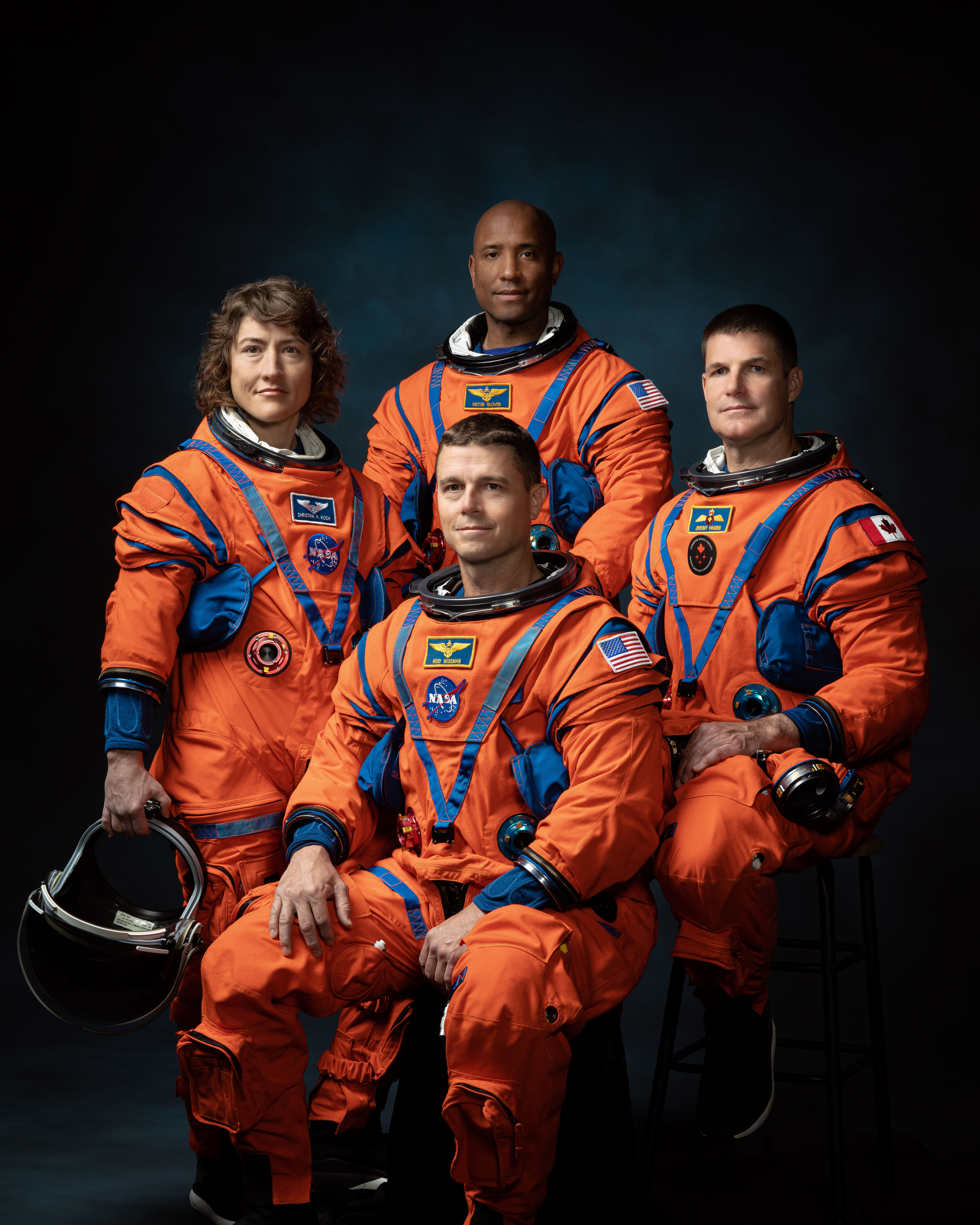
- Mission insignia Official crew portrait, clockwise from left: Koch, Glover, Hansen and Wiseman Artemis program

Artemis II (April 1–11, 2026) flew a crew of four on a flyby of the Moon. It was the first crewed flight of the NASA-led Artemis program, the only beyond low Earth orbit (LEO) since Apollo 17 in 1972, and the only beyond LEO not part of the Apollo program. It was also the first crewed flight of the Space Launch System and of the Orion spacecraft, which the crew named Integrity.

The four crew members of Artemis II were Victor Glover, the only person of color, Christina Koch, the only woman, Canadian Space Agency astronaut Jeremy Hansen the only person not from the United States, and Reid Wiseman the oldest person to travel beyond low Earth orbit and around the Moon. During their lunar flyby, the crew broke Apollo 13's record of 248,655 miles (400,171 km) for the greatest human distance from Earth, reaching a maximum distance of 252,756 miles (406,771 km).

The mission was a test flight supporting the Artemis IV mission to return humans to the lunar surface. Originally designated Exploration Mission-2 (EM-2) and intended to support the canceled Asteroid Redirect Mission, its objectives were revised after the establishment of the Artemis program in 2017. The mission's primary goal was to validate the Orion spacecraft's systems, crew operations, and mission procedures ahead of sustained lunar exploration in future Artemis missions. Artemis II's mission objectives were similar to those of Apollo 8 in 1968, the first crewed lunar flight of the Apollo program, while its free-return trajectory resembled that flown by Apollo 13 in 1970.

After its launch, Artemis II gained widespread global attention for its achievements and inclusive crew, giving rise to the term "Moon joy".

== History ==
=== Mission planning and launch date selection (2017–2021) ===
In 2017, Exploration Mission-2 was planned as a single-launch flight of a Space Launch System (SLS) Block 1B rocket equipped with the Exploration Upper Stage, carrying a lunar Block 1 Orion spacecraft, and a payload capacity of 50.7 tonnes (112,000 lb). The mission concept involved rendezvousing with an asteroid that would have been placed in lunar orbit by the robotic Asteroid Redirect Mission, allowing astronauts to conduct spacewalks and collect samples.

After the Asteroid Redirect Mission was cancelled in April 2017, NASA proposed an alternative mission involving an eight‑day free-return trajectory around the Moon with a crew of four astronauts.

Another 2017 proposal suggested sending four astronauts aboard Orion on an 8‑ to 21‑day lunar mission to deliver the first element of the planned Lunar Gateway space station. This proposal did not come to fruition, and in March 2018, NASA decided that the Gateway's initial module would instead launch on a commercial rocket due to delays in constructing the Mobile Launcher required for the more powerful Exploration Upper Stage. The SpaceX Falcon Heavy was selected as the launch vehicle. However, the Lunar Gateway program was cancelled in March 2026.

=== Hardware development, testing and integration (2021–2025) ===
On February 11, 2023, NASA rotated the Artemis II core stage's engine section to a horizontal position, marking the final major milestone before integration with the rest of the vehicle. On March 20, the engine section was mated with the core stage in Building 103 at the Michoud Assembly Facility in New Orleans, Louisiana. In March 2023, NASA initially expected to deliver the completed core stage to the Kennedy Space Center (KSC) that summer, but by May, the timeline had shifted to late autumn 2023.

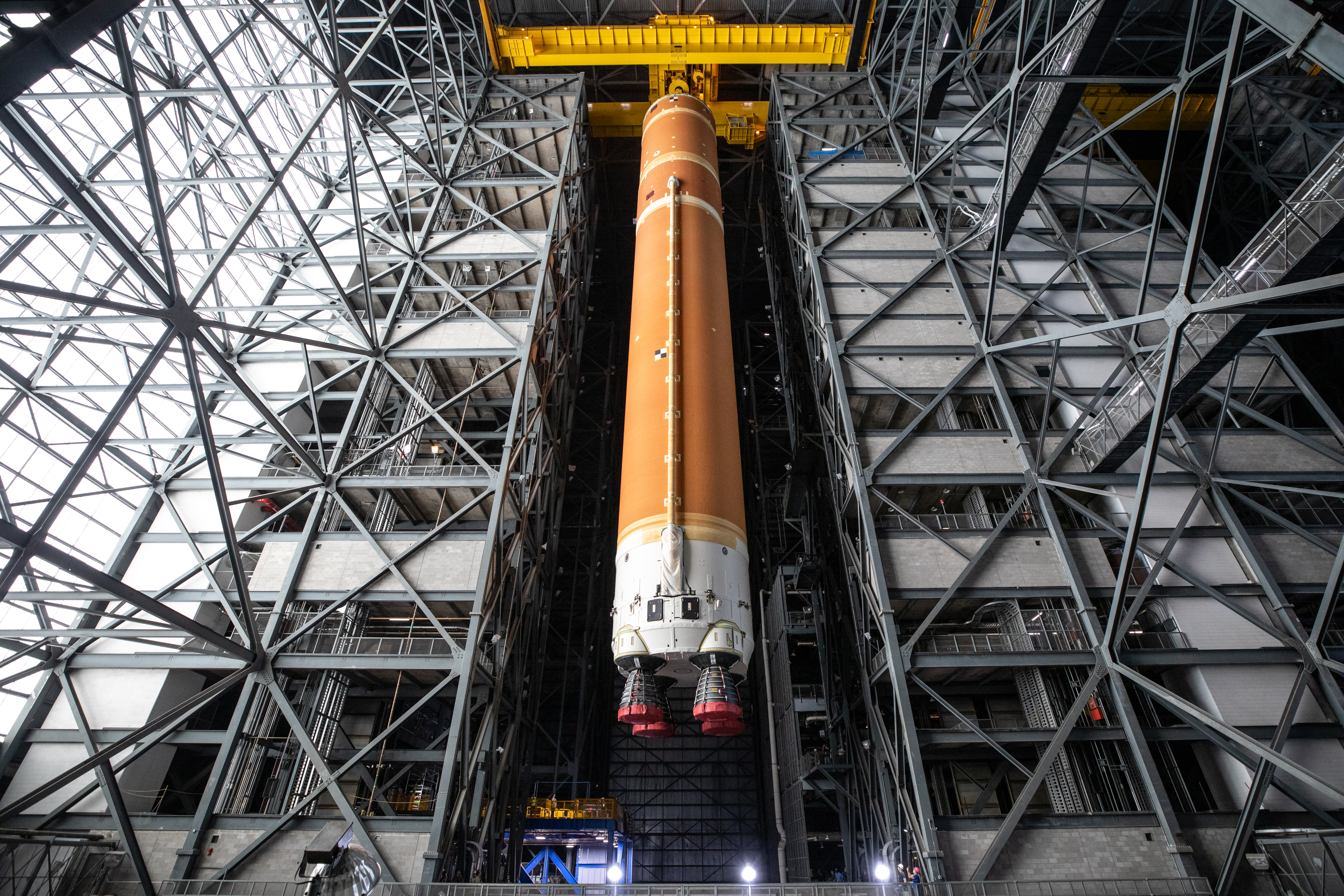
SLS core stage for Artemis II lifted into High Bay 2 of the Vehicle Assembly Building shortly after stacking operations began in December 2024

The four RS-25 engines (serial numbers E2047, E2059, E2062, and E2063) were installed on the core stage by September 25, 2023. After a leak was discovered in the oxygen‑valve hydraulics, engine E2063 was replaced with E2061 in April 2025.

The fully outfitted core stage was delivered to KSC between July 16 and 25, 2024. The adapters required for integration of the full launch vehicle reached substantial completion in June 2024 and arrived at KSC in September 2024.

The Artemis II crew was announced on April 3, 2023, by NASA administrator Bill Nelson during his "State of NASA" address at a NASA facility at Ellington Field outside Houston, Texas. The crew made a public appearance that evening at the nearby NRG Stadium during the 2023 March Madness basketball championship game.

NASA had originally targeted September 2024 to begin rocket-stacking operations. However, the schedule was delayed by more than two months due to investigations into issues with Orion's life-support system and unexpected heat shield damage observed after the Artemis I reentry. Rocket stacking began on November 20, 2024. Stacking was completed on October 20, 2025, with the installation of the fully integrated Orion spacecraft, ESM, and launch abort system atop the SLS rocket.

=== Heat shield concerns ===
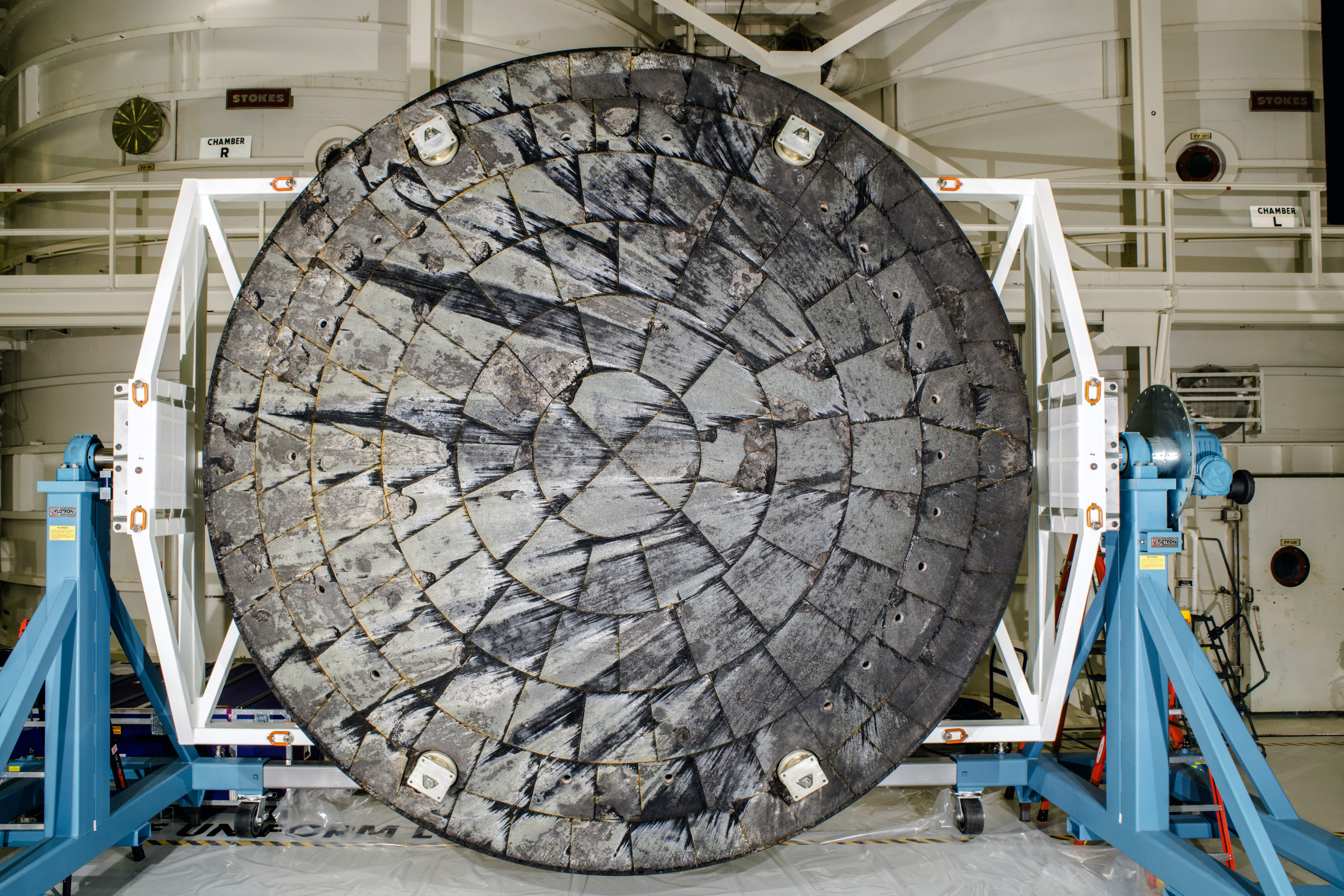
Artemis I heat shield showing damage after recovery

After the uncrewed Artemis I mission in November 2022, NASA engineers identified unexpected erosion of the Orion spacecraft's ablative heat shield following atmospheric reentry. Post-flight inspections found areas of char loss in the AVCOAT ablative heat shield material, in which portions of the material eroded more extensively than predicted by preflight models. NASA reported that temperatures inside the crew module remained within design limits, but the unanticipated behavior of the material prompted further investigation. Close-up imagery of the damage was not publicly released until May 2024, when it appeared in a report issued by the NASA Office of Inspector General.

In April 2024, NASA established an independent review team to assess heat shield performance and the agency's proposed approach for the Artemis II mission. The review concluded in December 2024, after which NASA announced that it would proceed with Artemis II using the existing heat shield. NASA held a press briefing to outline its findings, but the publicly released version of the review team's report was heavily redacted, prompting criticism from some former NASA engineers and astronauts regarding the level of transparency.

NASA engineers determined that the char loss observed during Artemis I was caused by hot gases becoming trapped within the AVCOAT material, leading to spalling, cracking and increased localized material loss during reentry. Rather than replacing the heat shield for Artemis II, NASA modified the reentry trajectory by increasing the descent angle, reducing the time the spacecraft would spend in the thermal environment associated with the damage. According to NASA, modeling and ground testing indicated that this change would limit further char loss while remaining within Orion's structural and thermal margins.

As part of the certification process for Artemis II, NASA conducted additional testing and analysis, including evaluations of scenarios involving more extensive heat-shield damage. NASA stated that these analyses showed the underlying structure of the Orion capsule would remain intact and capable of protecting the crew under conditions exceeding those expected during the mission's reentry.

In January 2026, NASA administrator Jared Isaacman stated that he supported proceeding with Artemis II using the existing heat shield after reviewing the agency's analysis and meeting with engineers and outside experts. Some participants who had previously expressed concerns indicated that the additional data addressed their questions, while others continued to object to flying the mission without a redesigned heat shield. NASA has stated that design changes addressing AVCOAT permeability are planned for the heat shield intended for Artemis III.

=== Mission delays ===
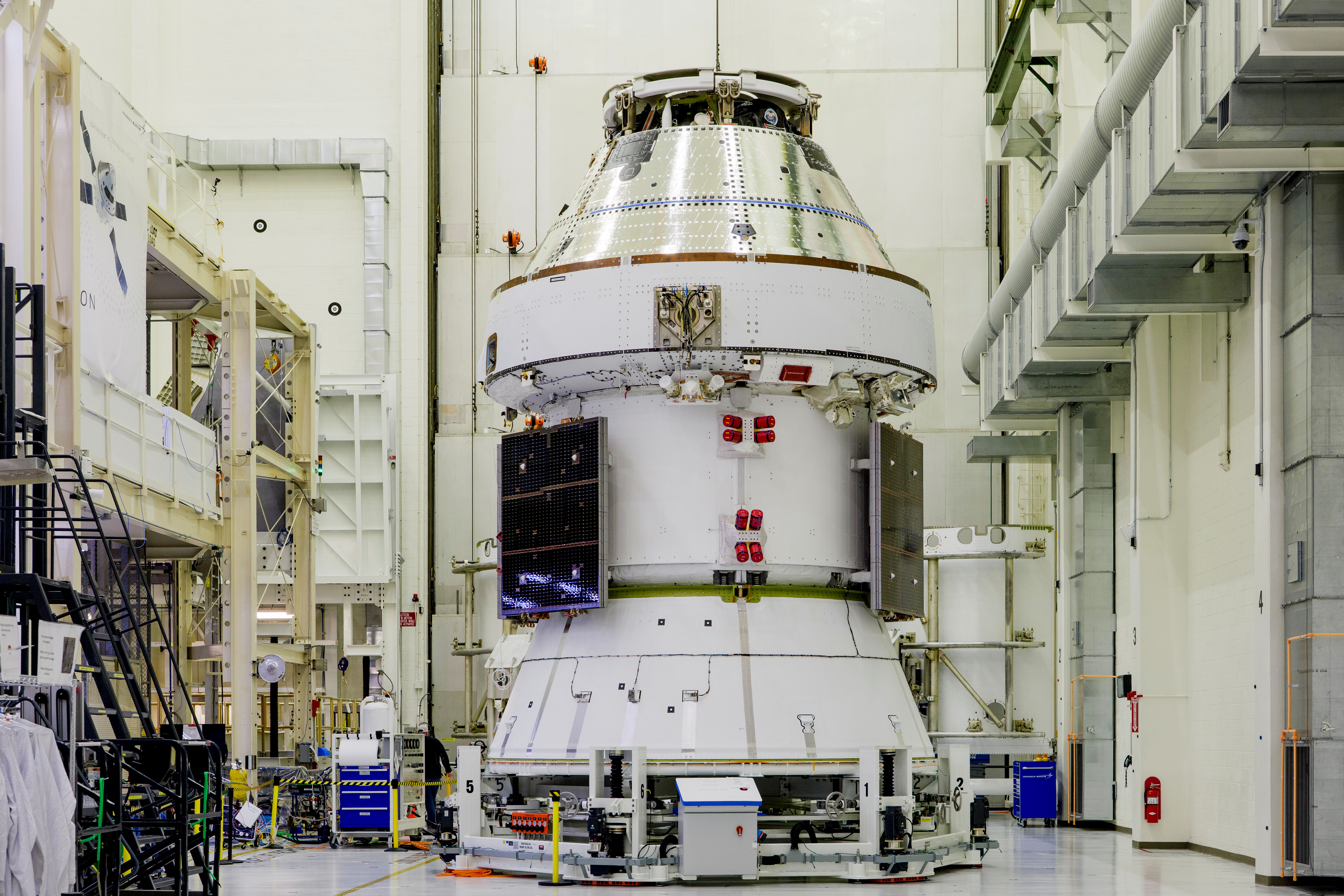
Orion spacecraft and its European Service Module for the Artemis II mission being prepared in March 2025

During preliminary reviews in 2011, the launch date was placed somewhere between 2019 and 2021, but afterwards the launch date was delayed to 2023. In January 2024, the mission was expected to launch in September 2025. However, in October 2024, the NASA Office of Inspector General determined that the Exploration Ground Systems team had exhausted their time reserved for resolving any unforeseen issues, leading the office to determine that the September 2025 launch date would likely be delayed. In December 2024, outgoing administrator Nelson announced that the launch was delayed due to the months of engineering investigations into issues with the life support system and heat shield, but they were targeting a launch in April 2026.

In March 2025, AmericaSpace reported that the launch date could be accelerated by two months to February 2026. NASA responded in a statement, saying it could not confirm the revised date but noted, "We're looking for ways to enable an earlier launch if possible, potentially launching as soon as February 2026. A February target allows the agency to capitalize on efficiencies in the flow of operations to integrate the SLS rocket, Orion spacecraft, and supporting ground systems while maintaining crew safety as the top priority." By August 2025, more mainstream outlets such as NASASpaceflight, journalist Eric Berger and U.S. Senator and former astronaut Mark Kelly also reported that the mission had been moved to February 2026. In September 2025, space agency officials announced that they were pursuing a launch window that opened on February 5, 2026.

For the launch of lunar missions, there are both monthly windows of a few days duration each lunar month, and daily windows lasting a few hours on days within the monthly window. The revised Artemis II plan, which called for Orion to conduct a shorter skip reentry, further constrained the days within a monthly window during which a launch could be conducted.

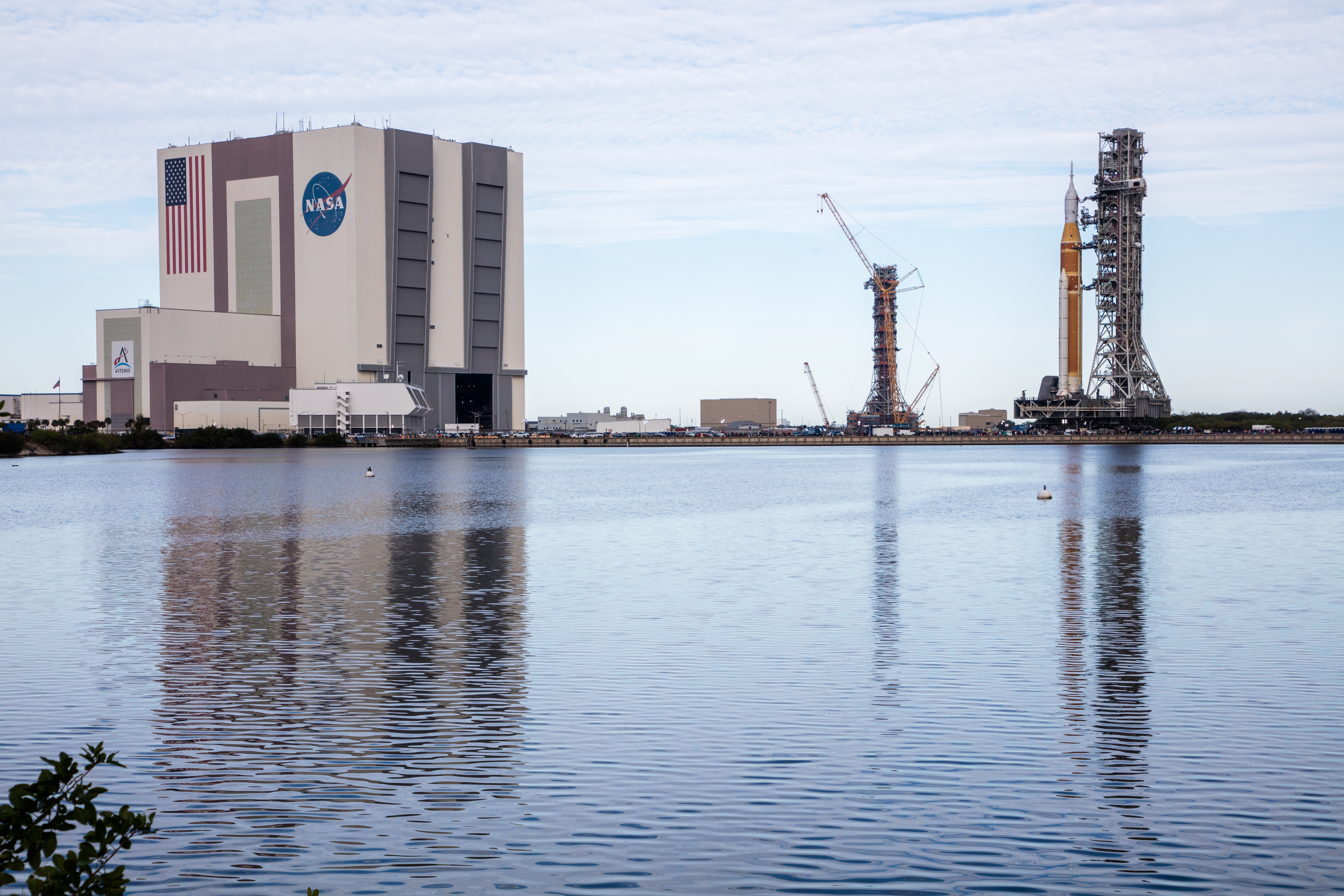
The Artemis II stack being rolled out of the VAB before its February launch attempt, January 2026

The earliest launch window for Artemis II was originally set for early February 2026, but launch preparations were delayed due to the January 2026 North American winter storm. On January 18, 2026, the integrated SLS rocket, Orion capsule, and launch tower were rolled out from the Vehicle Assembly Building to Launch Complex 39B. A wet dress rehearsal of the countdown occurred February 2. After the test, NASA announced that the launch was postponed to March due to a liquid hydrogen leak that occurred during the simulated countdown. In addition to the leak, a valve associated with Orion crew module hatch pressurization required retorquing, and closeout operations took longer than planned. A second wet dress rehearsal occurred on February 19 and was successful.

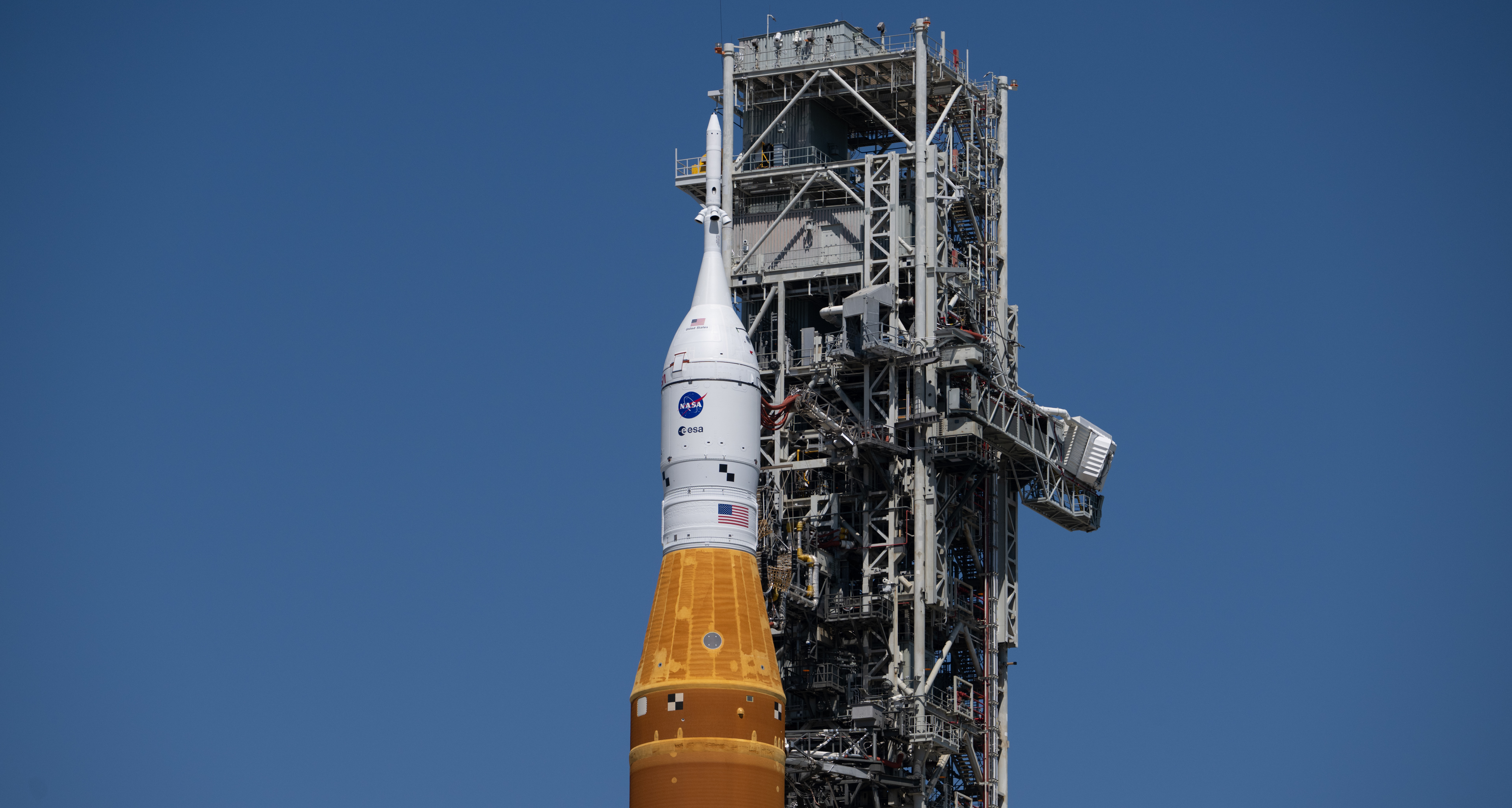
The mission's upper stage, as seen on March 20

On February 21, a helium flow issue was observed, triggering a rollback to the Vehicle Assembly Building (VAB) and delaying the mission to April. The rollback began on February 25 at 9:38 am EST and the integrated SLS rocket arrived back at the VAB at about 8:00 pm. NASA administrator Jared Isaacman said that an actual launch date was to be confirmed only after a successful wet dress rehearsal was complete and the results were analyzed.

=== Launch scheduling ===
Earlier in March 2026, NASA announced that the upper-stage helium-flow problem, which had previously necessitated a rollback for repairs, had been fixed and was undergoing validation. On March 12, after a Flight Readiness Review (FRR), NASA cleared Artemis II's rocket for an April launch following these repairs, with the review polling 'go' to proceed toward an April 1 launch attempt. NASA stated that the team and hardware were ready. Seven two-hour launch windows were announced for April 1–6 and April 30, with the first launch window being on April 1, 2026. On March 18, NASA announced that the Artemis II Space Launch System (SLS) rocket and Orion spacecraft would be rolled out the next day to Launch Pad 39B at the agency's Kennedy Space Center in Florida. Meanwhile, the Artemis II crew entered quarantine in Houston, Texas, to ensure they remained healthy ahead of the launch. On March 20, after a delay due to high winds, the SLS was rolled out from the VAB to launch pad 39B a second time.

== Crew ==
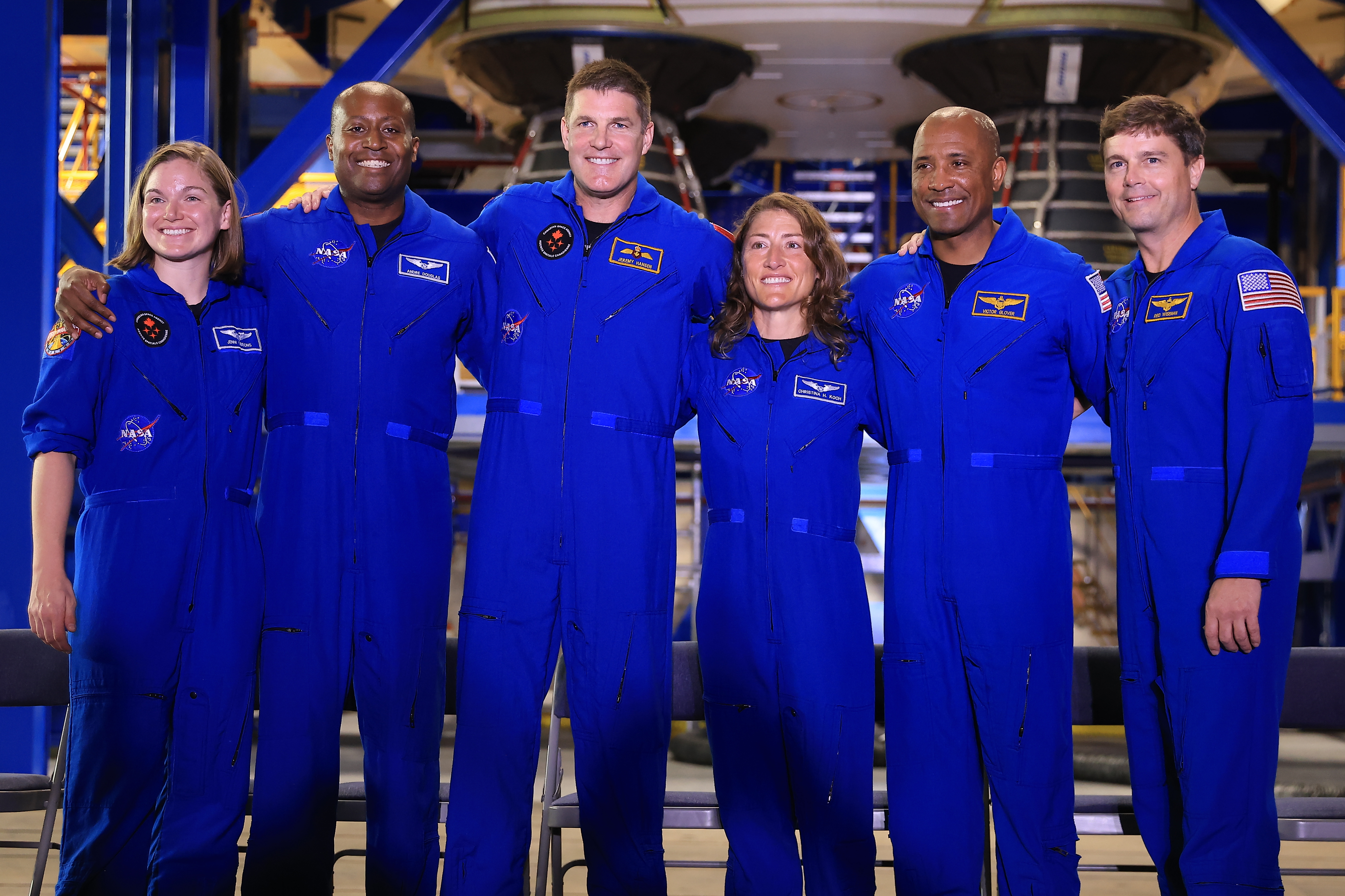
The backup (standing left) and prime crew of Artemis II after a news conference in December 2024. From left to right: Jenni Gibbons, Andre Douglas, Jeremy Hansen, Christina Koch, Victor Glover, Reid Wiseman

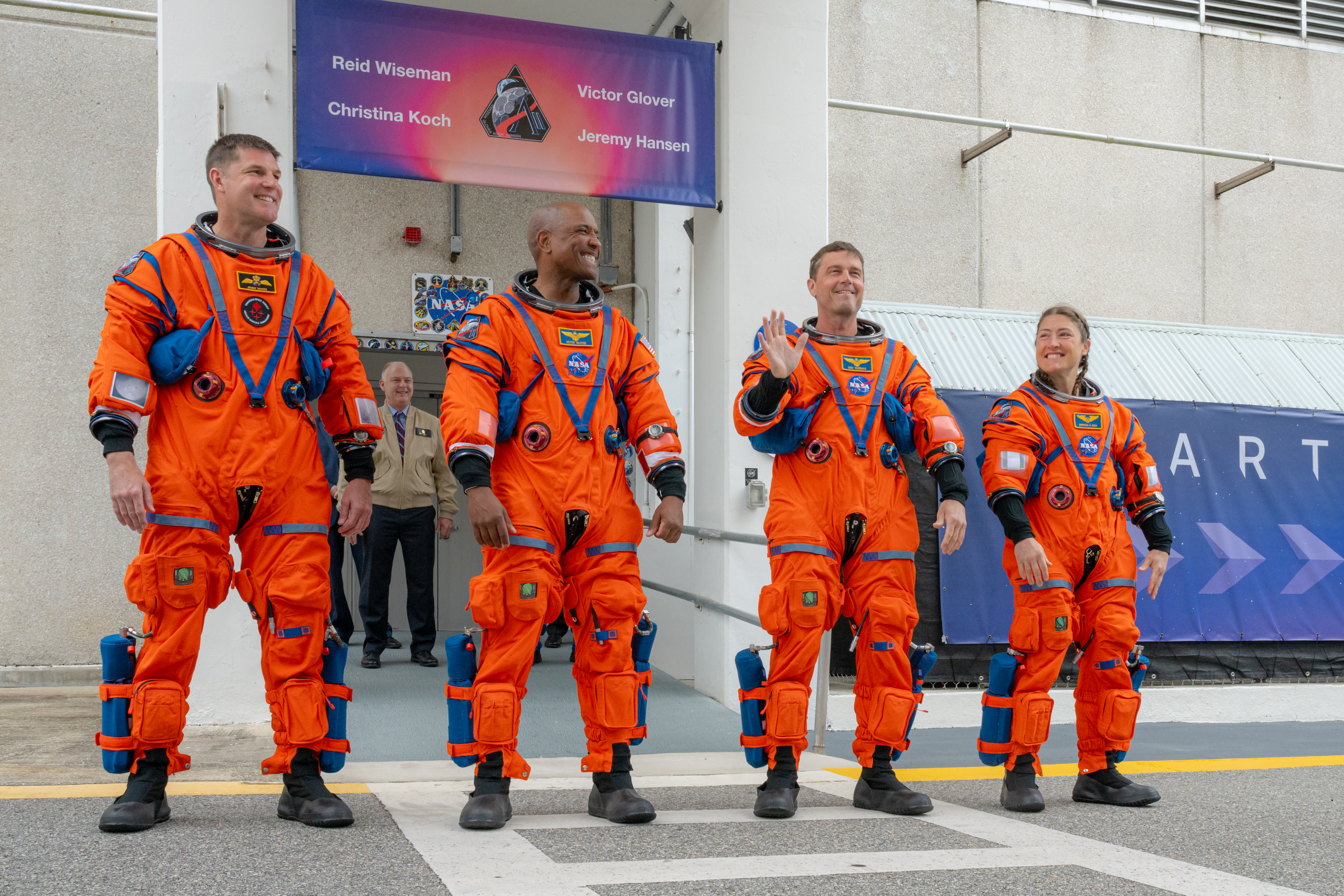
The crew of Artemis II walk out of the Operations and Checkout Building, just before boarding the spacecraft on April 1, 2026.

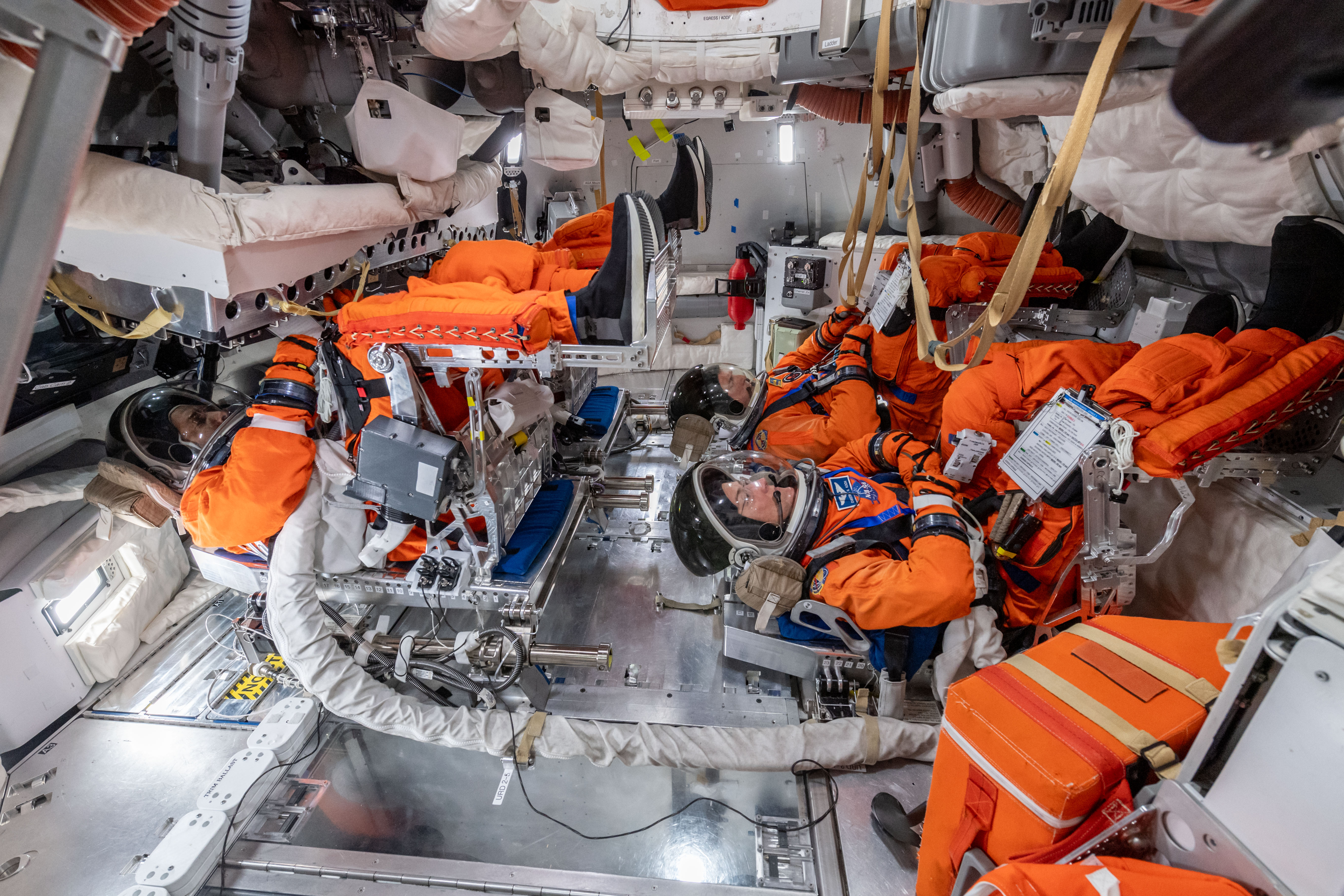
The crew of Artemis II training inside an Orion mock-up in January 2025

Prime crew
Position	Astronaut
Commander	Reid Wiseman, NASA; Second and last spaceflight
Pilot	Victor Glover, NASA; Second and last spaceflight
Mission Specialist 1	Christina Koch, NASA; Second and last spaceflight
Mission Specialist 2	Jeremy Hansen, CSA; Only spaceflight

Backup crew
Position	Astronaut
Mission Specialist	Andre Douglas, NASA
Mission Specialist	Jenni Gibbons, CSA

Artemis II was crewed by four astronauts: commander Reid Wiseman, pilot Victor Glover, and mission specialist Christina Koch, all from the NASA Astronaut Corps, along with mission specialist Jeremy Hansen from the Canadian Astronaut Corps. On November 22, 2023, Jenni Gibbons was named as Hansen's backup, and on July 3, 2024, Andre Douglas was named as the backup for the three NASA astronauts. Glover became the first person of color, Koch the first woman, Wiseman the oldest person, and Hansen the first non-American to travel around the Moon. This mission was Hansen's first spaceflight. Hansen and Gibbons, both Canadians, were selected by the Canadian Space Agency as part of a 2020 treaty between the United States and Canada that facilitated the participation of Canadian astronauts in the Artemis program. This mission broke the record for the most people in deep space at once, set at three during Apollo 8 in December 1968.

Rise, a zero-gravity indicator plush toy onboard Artemis II with the astronauts, was designed by 8-year-old Lucas Ye.

== Mission ==
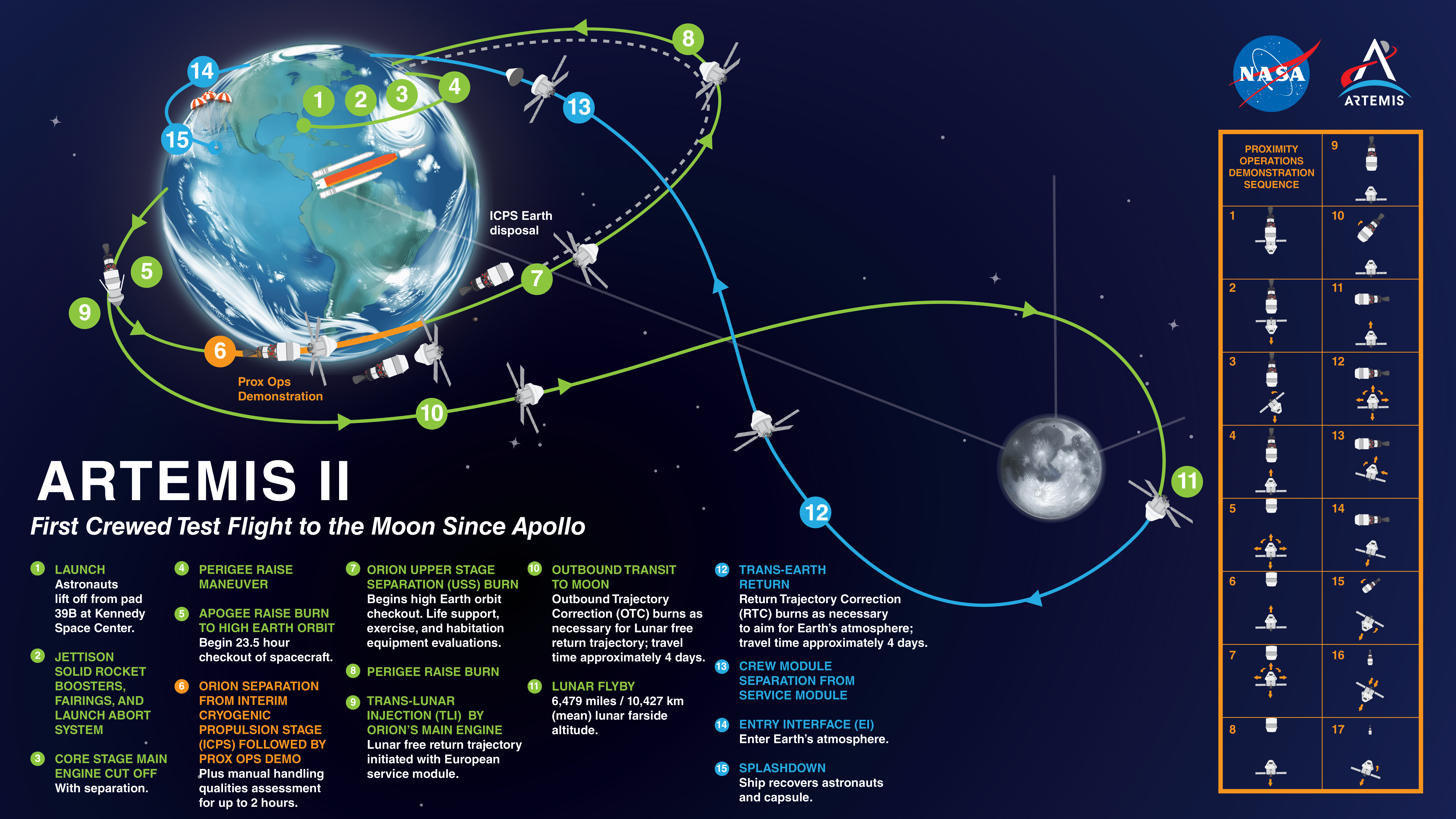
Diagram showing the planned objectives of the Artemis II mission

Artemis II's mission was a crewed flight test with four astronauts evaluating the performance of the Space Launch System (SLS) rocket along with the Orion spacecraft and its European Service Module (ESM) in deep space. The first day of the mission was spent largely in high Earth orbit, where the crew conducted system checkouts. Orion operated in a highly elliptical, high Earth orbit with a period of roughly 24 hours, allowing extended testing of onboard systems. During this phase, the crew evaluated life support and other critical spacecraft systems, and performed a rendezvous and proximity operations demonstration using the spent Interim Cryogenic Propulsion Stage (ICPS) as a target. After NASA mission managers confirmed Orion's performance, the spacecraft executed a trans-lunar injection (TLI) burn to depart Earth orbit. Orion then traveled toward the Moon on a free-return trajectory, looping around the far side before naturally returning toward Earth on a free-return trajectory without requiring additional propulsion for the return leg. Notably, the crew received "wake-up calls" from Mission Control on every day of the flight, a NASA tradition since the Apollo missions, consisting of music designed to keep the crew on a steady rhythm and boost morale, and inspirational speeches recorded specifically for the flight, including messages from Apollo astronauts Charlie Duke and the late Jim Lovell.

Artemis II's trajectory can be divided into several key phases, over an approximately nine-day trip:

=== Launch ===
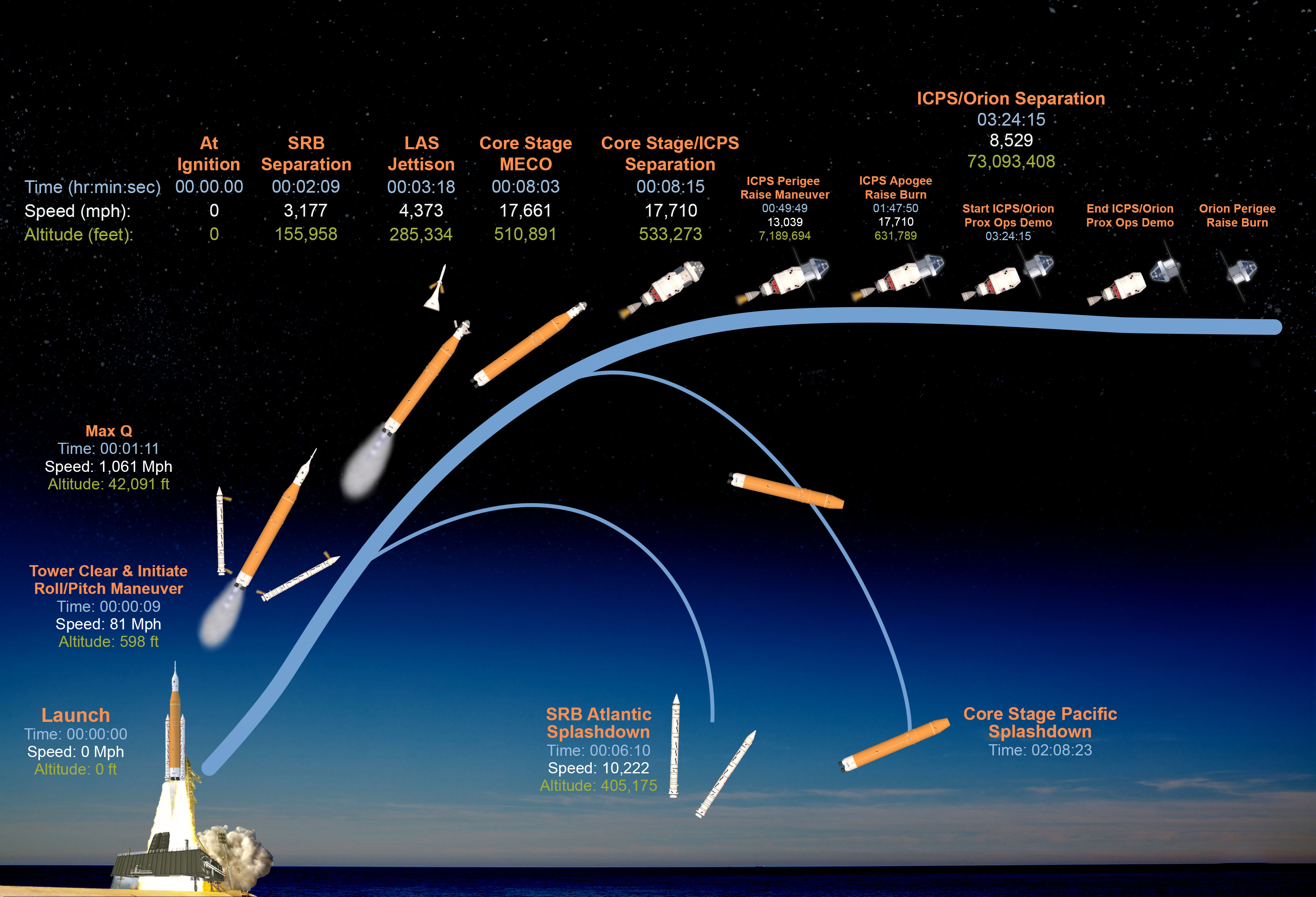
Key events from launch and ascent to space

Artemis II lifts off from Launch Complex 39B at NASA's Kennedy Space Center in Florida on April 1, 2026

The crew arrived at Kennedy Space Center on March 27, and the launch countdown began on March 30. The mission launched aboard an SLS rocket on April 1 from Kennedy Space Center's Launch Complex 39B at 22:35:12 UTC (6:35:12 p.m. EDT, local time at the launch site). It was the first crewed launch from LC-39B since STS-116 in 2006.

The four RS-25 main engines on the core stage ignited approximately seven seconds before liftoff; after their performance was confirmed at full power, the solid rocket boosters (whose ignition cannot be reversed) ignited at T-0, providing the majority of thrust during the first two minutes of flight. Booster separation occurred at roughly 3,100 miles per hour (5,000 km/h) at an altitude of 30 miles (48 km). The boosters subsequently splashed down in the Atlantic Ocean about six minutes after launch. Unlike the Space Shuttle boosters, the SLS boosters were not recovered.

Wiseman monitored the launch from the left seat of Orion at the primary controls. The flight was fully automated, and no crew intervention was required, though Wiseman could have issued an abort command if necessary. The core stage burned for about eight minutes before separation, leaving Orion in a highly elliptical orbit with an apogee of roughly 1,400 miles (2,300 km), nearly five times higher than the International Space Station, but a suborbital perigee. The ICPS upper stage did not fire during the initial ascent. The core stage made a destructive reentry over the Pacific Ocean approximately two hours after launch.

=== High Earth orbit and systems checkout ===
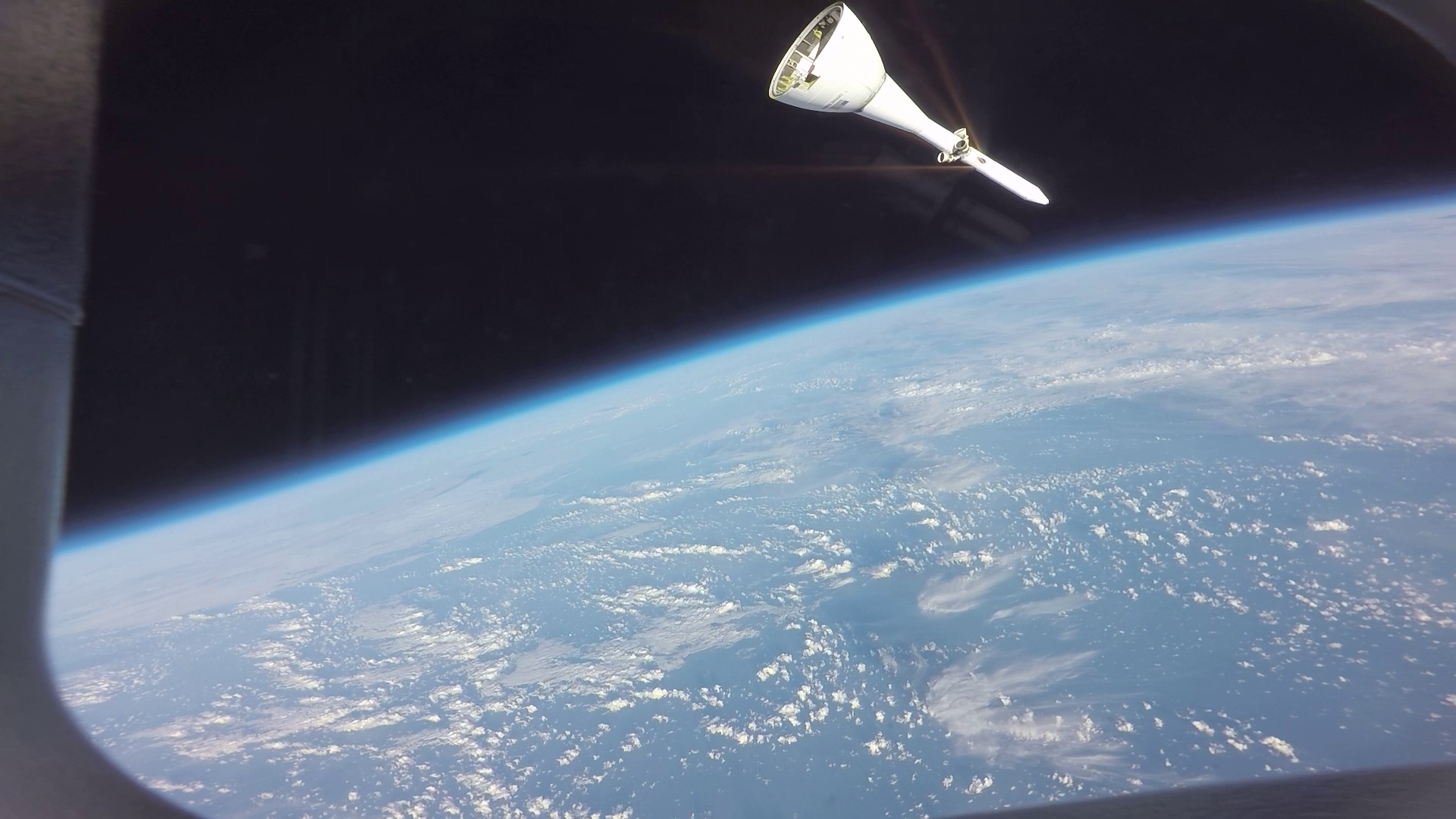
The launch abort system after it was jettisoned, as viewed by an automatic camera on Integrity

Immediately after main-engine cutoff, Koch and Hansen unstrapped from their seats to set up and test essential life support systems aboard the spacecraft, including the water dispenser, firefighting masks, and toilet. All systems checked out (after the crew resolved minor issues with the toilet and water dispenser), giving mission managers the confidence to proceed with the ICPS burn at apogee, about 50 minutes after liftoff, to raise Orion's perigee. Prior to this burn, Orion's perigee was suborbital (in the atmosphere), a deliberate safety measure that ensured a natural reentry without requiring any additional burns in the event of a major anomaly. The ICPS burn raised the perigee out of the atmosphere, placing the spacecraft into a stable low Earth orbit.

When the spacecraft reached this new perigee about an hour later, it executed a 15-minute burn to raise its next apogee to 44,000 miles (71,000 km; 38,000 nmi), establishing a 23.5-hour high Earth orbit. This marked the first time a crewed spacecraft had entered a high Earth orbit without proceeding directly to the Moon.

Artemis II lifts off into space as official NASA broadcasters countdown from ten seconds.

After this burn, which consumed nearly all the fuel in the ICPS, the Orion and ESM separated from the upper stage. The crew then conducted a "proximity operations" demonstration using the ICPS as a target. Over approximately 70 minutes, Glover, now in the left seat of Orion, took manual control of the spacecraft and performed a series of maneuvers to evaluate handling qualities and practice techniques for future docking operations. The ICPS was equipped with a docking target, enabling tests of Orion's ability to manually maneuver relative to another spacecraft using onboard navigation sensors and reaction control thrusters.

Following the demonstration, Orion returned to automated control while the ICPS performed a deorbit burn for destructive reentry over the Pacific Ocean, deploying its rideshare CubeSats during this phase.

After these operations, the crew reconfigured the cabin for spaceflight, set up their flywheel exercise device and used it to conduct a life-support system stress test through physical activity, performing both aerobic and resistance exercises using a compact cable-driven system designed to operate within the spacecraft's mass and volume constraints, and had dinner.

The first sleep period was divided into two four-hour segments, interrupted to monitor a 43-second burn by the European Service Module that raised the spacecraft's perigee again to prepare for a trans-lunar injection (TLI) burn. Following the burn, the astronauts returned to sleep while NASA managers reviewed spacecraft performance before authorizing the TLI burn.

=== Trans-lunar injection and outbound flight ===
Hello, World photograph taken by Wiseman from Integrity after trans-lunar injection, showing the full Earth with its night side illuminated by the Moon. The mission included the first human-taken photos of the full Earth disk since the Apollo program.

On flight day 2, following completion of high Earth orbit operations and system checks, Orion performed a 5-minute, 49-second TLI burn using the ESM's AJ10 main engine. This was the only use of the main engine during the mission; subsequent maneuvers were carried out by the eight smaller R-4D secondary engines. The burn consumed approximately 1,000 pounds (450 kg) of hypergolic propellant and placed the spacecraft on a free-return trajectory around the Moon, requiring only minor course corrections for the remainder of the mission.

On flight day 3, the first of three planned outbound trajectory correction burns was deemed unnecessary after Mission Control determined the spacecraft was already on a favorable trajectory. The crew encountered an issue with the built-in space toilet when urine froze in the vent lines, preventing it from being ejected into space. This was resolved by switching on vent heaters and by rotating the spacecraft to expose the vent to the warmth of the sun, melting the urine.

On flight day 4, Koch and Hansen took turns manually controlling the spacecraft to evaluate its performance in deep space. Over 41 minutes, they tested two thruster control modes (six degrees of freedom and three degrees of freedom) to provide engineers with further data and perspectives on the spacecraft's handling qualities.

On flight day 5, Orion performed a 17 1/2-second outbound trajectory correction burn to refine its path toward the Moon. Of the three planned outbound correction burns, this was the only one executed. The crew also tested their Orion Crew Survival System suits and conferred with mission control to review lunar surface targets for observation and photography during the flyby and finalize observation techniques.

=== Lunar flyby ===
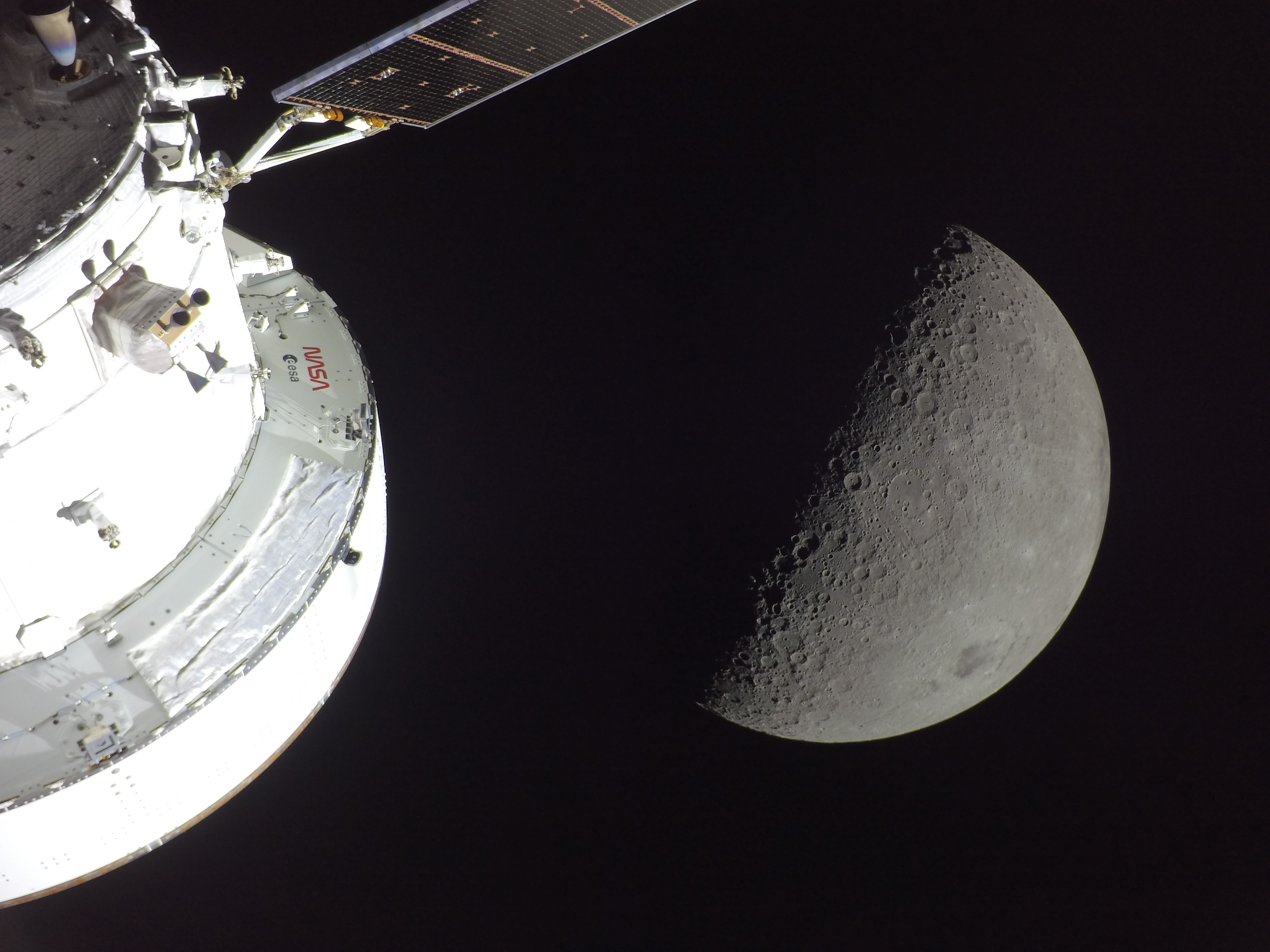
Integrity approaching the Moon on April 6, 2026

On flight day 6, Orion entered the Moon's sphere of influence, where lunar gravity became the dominant force shaping its trajectory. Orion flew around the Moon at a closest approach of about 4,067 miles (6,545 km; 3,534 nmi) from the far-side lunar surface at 23:00 UTC on April 6. Its farthest distance from Earth was 252,756 miles (406,771 km; 219,639 nmi) at 23:02 UTC, and it surpassed Apollo 13's 248,655 miles (400,171 km; 216,075 nmi) record as the farthest crewed mission from Earth at 17:56 UTC. As the crew passed behind the Moon, Orion experienced a planned loss of signal for 40 minutes, beginning at 22:46 UTC, and recovered signals from Earth at 23:24 UTC. The crew put aside their duties and briefly gathered, for about 30 seconds, to share maple leaf cream cookies, making this what Hansen called a "surreal moment." The Canadian Space Agency's provision of a "Canadian" food package for the crew, including breakfast cereal, smoked salmon and traditional maple cookies, was announced back in February - with astronaut Jeremy Hansen stating that while there are certain rules for eating in space, he would not be shoving whole cookies into his mouth to avoid crumbs, as it was "simple common sense."

During their flyby, the crew observed two unnamed craters which they proposed be named Integrity, after their spacecraft, and Carroll, after Wiseman's late wife, who died of cancer in 2020.

The crew photographed a solar eclipse, with the Moon blocking out the Sun. Earthshine illuminates parts of the Moon and either or both the solar corona and the zodiacal light are visible as a spiking glow around the Moon.

After the blackout, the Orion experienced a solar eclipse. It lasted for 57 minutes, beginning at 01:35 UTC and lasting until 02:32 UTC. The crew donned eclipse glasses until the Sun was fully obscured, after which they observed both the solar corona as well as "impact flashes" from meteoroids impacting the dark portion of the Moon. Stars and planets, including Venus, Mars, Saturn and Mercury, were visible alongside the corona, as was earthshine illuminating the Moon.

=== Return flight ===
On flight day 7, Orion and its crew exited the Moon's sphere of influence and began their return to Earth on a free-return trajectory. The crew conducted a 15-minute audio-only call with NASA astronauts Jessica Meir, Jack Hathaway, and Chris Williams, and ESA astronaut Sophie Adenot aboard the International Space Station, pointing out that together they became the humans furthest ever from another. Afterwards, they debriefed with NASA science officers on their lunar observations while memories of the flyby were still fresh. The remainder of the day included staggered off-duty periods for rest ahead of final return preparations. The day concluded with a 15-second trajectory correction burn, the first of three that refined the path of the spacecraft toward Earth.

On flight day 8, a planned manual control test by Wiseman and Glover was canceled so controllers could conduct additional testing of Orion's propulsion system. The change allowed engineers to gather data on a small helium leak in the ESM and better characterize its behavior in flight. Although the leak did not affect mission safety, the data is expected to inform propulsion system modifications for future Artemis missions. A planned demonstration of the spacecraft's radiation shielding was also canceled.

On flight day 9, Orion performed a 9-second trajectory correction burn to refine its return path to Earth. The remainder of the day was largely devoted to cabin preparations, with the crew stowing equipment, installing their seats, and reviewing reentry procedures ahead of splashdown.

On flight day 10, Orion conducted an 8-second trajectory correction burn, the final firing of the ESM before it was jettisoned prior to reentry. NASA said that the mission had consumed less than half of the fuel aboard the ESM. After the separation, the thrusters on the crew module fired for 19 seconds to push it away from the ESM and put it into the proper angle for reentry.

=== Re-entry and splashdown ===
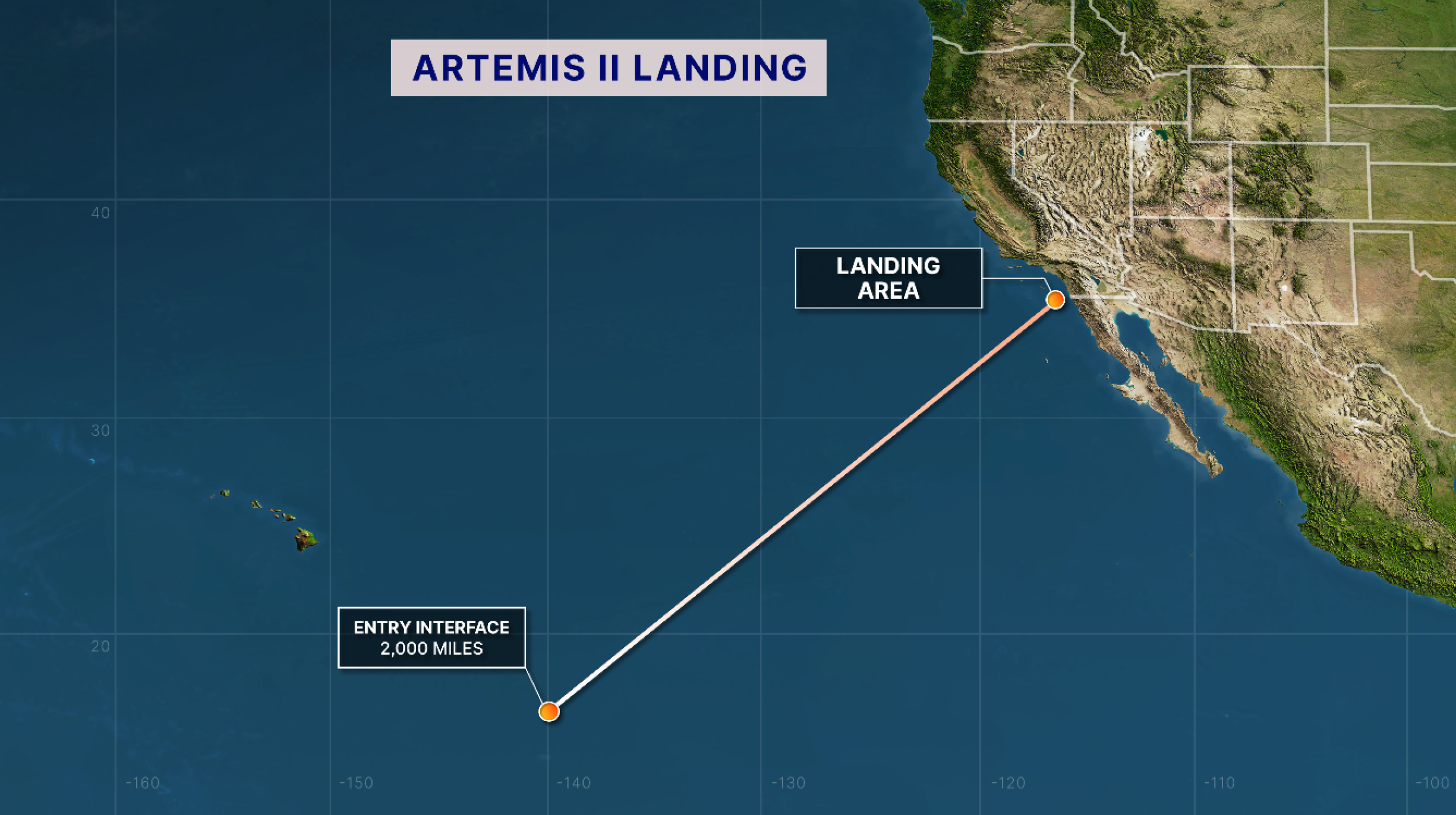
Landing path of Artemis II

On flight day 10, Integrity re-entered Earth's atmosphere at a maximum velocity of about 24,664 miles per hour (36,174 ft/s; 39,693 km/h; 11 km/s) before decelerating. This maximum velocity, while higher than generally seen for missions to low Earth orbit, is comparable to those reached during lunar-return missions of the Apollo program. The maximum velocity was initially expected to be approximately 25,000 miles per hour (40,000 km/h), which would have broken Apollo 10's record of 24,791 mph.

Mission planners had originally planned for a skip reentry profile, in which the Orion spacecraft would briefly dip into the upper atmosphere to generate lift, dissipate energy, and improve landing precision. However, this was replaced with a steeper direct entry trajectory to limit heating duration following the unexpected heat shield erosion observed after Artemis I's reentry.

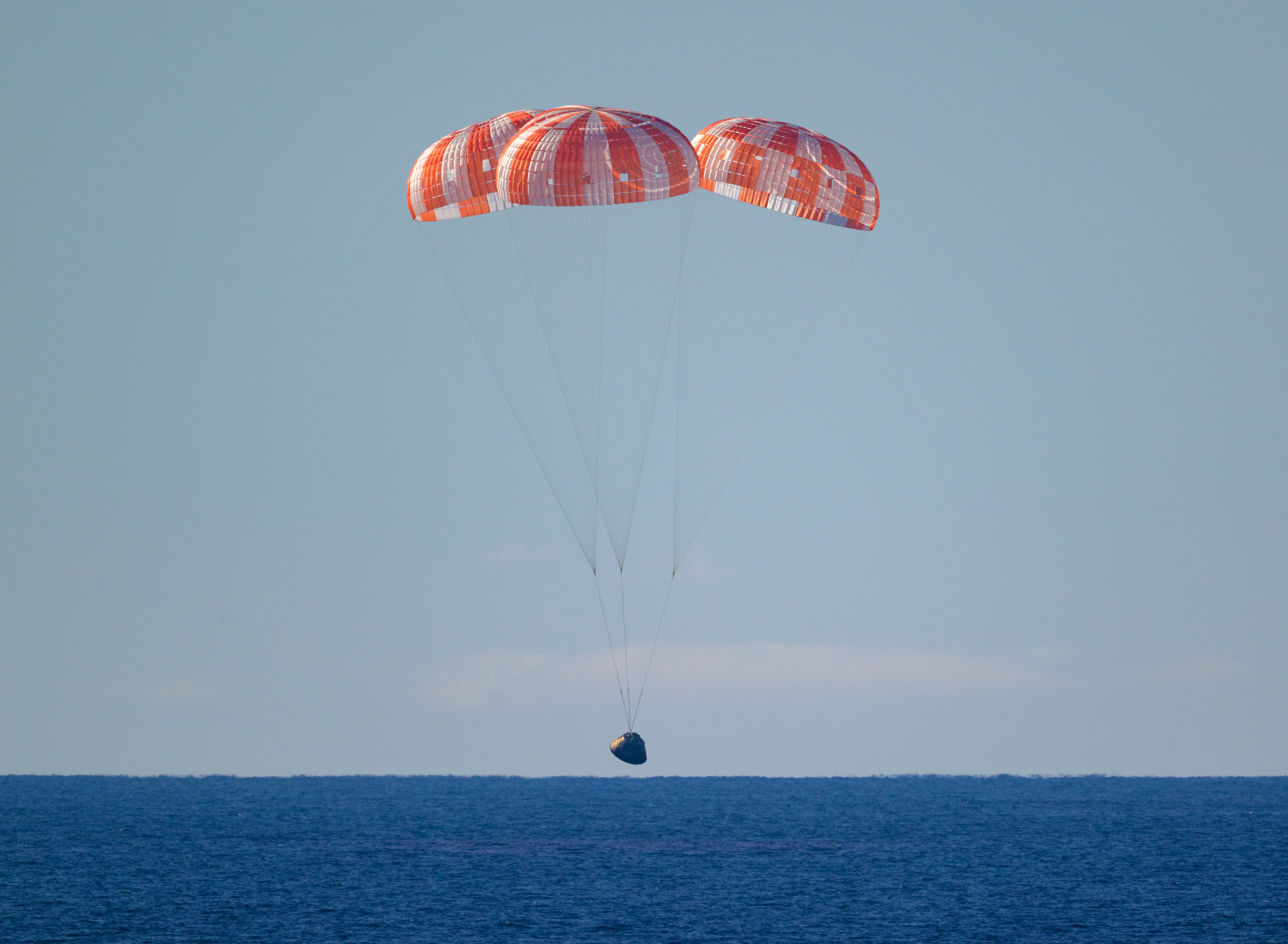
Integrity about to splashdown in the Pacific Ocean

Splashdown occurred April 11, 2026, 00:07:27 UTC (April 10, 5:07:27 p.m. PDT local time), in the Pacific Ocean southwest of San Diego, California, where the U.S. Navy recovered the crew. It became the first crewed NASA mission to be recovered by the Navy since the Apollo–Soyuz Test Project in 1975.

NASA confirmed on April 7, 2026 (flight day 7), that the amphibious transport dock USS John P. Murtha had departed Naval Base San Diego for the recovery area.

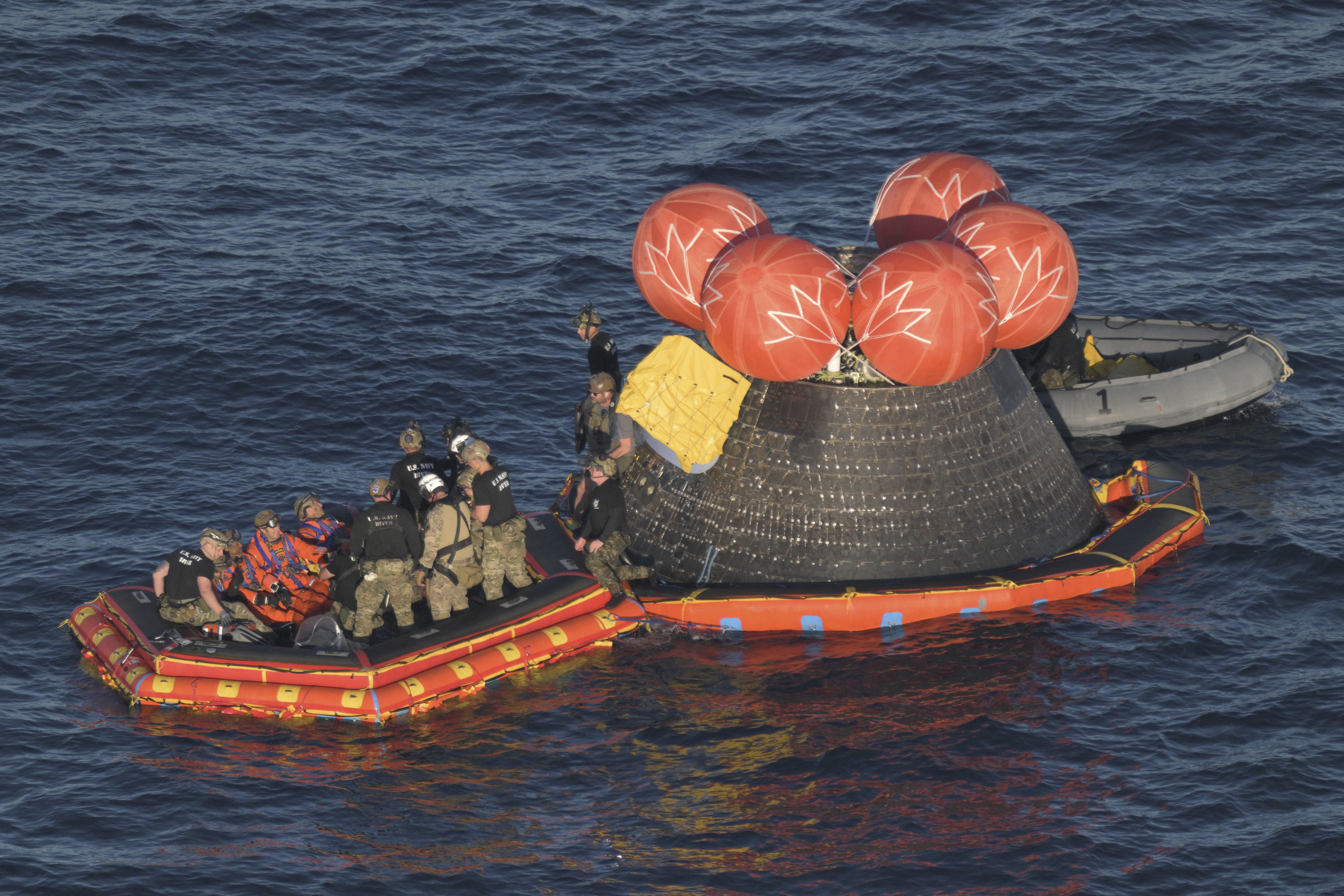
Navy divers helping the crew onto the "front porch"

Following splashdown, NASA reported a communications issue between Orion and recovery teams, preventing them from approaching the spacecraft. When communications were established, the joint NASA and Navy team approached the capsule in inflatable boats. Navy divers stabilized the spacecraft using a sea anchor and attached an inflatable collar to balance the spacecraft. They then attached an inflatable raft, known as a "front porch", to the side hatch, and conducted initial checks before crew egress.

Crew members exited the capsule individually onto the raft, where they were fitted with hoisting gear and lifted into helicopters. The helicopters transported the astronauts to the USS John P. Murtha, where they were taken to the medical bay for post-flight evaluation. Post-landing testing included functional assessments such as obstacle course activities and a simulated spacewalk to evaluate readaptation to gravity following the mission and in preparation for future lunar and Mars operations.

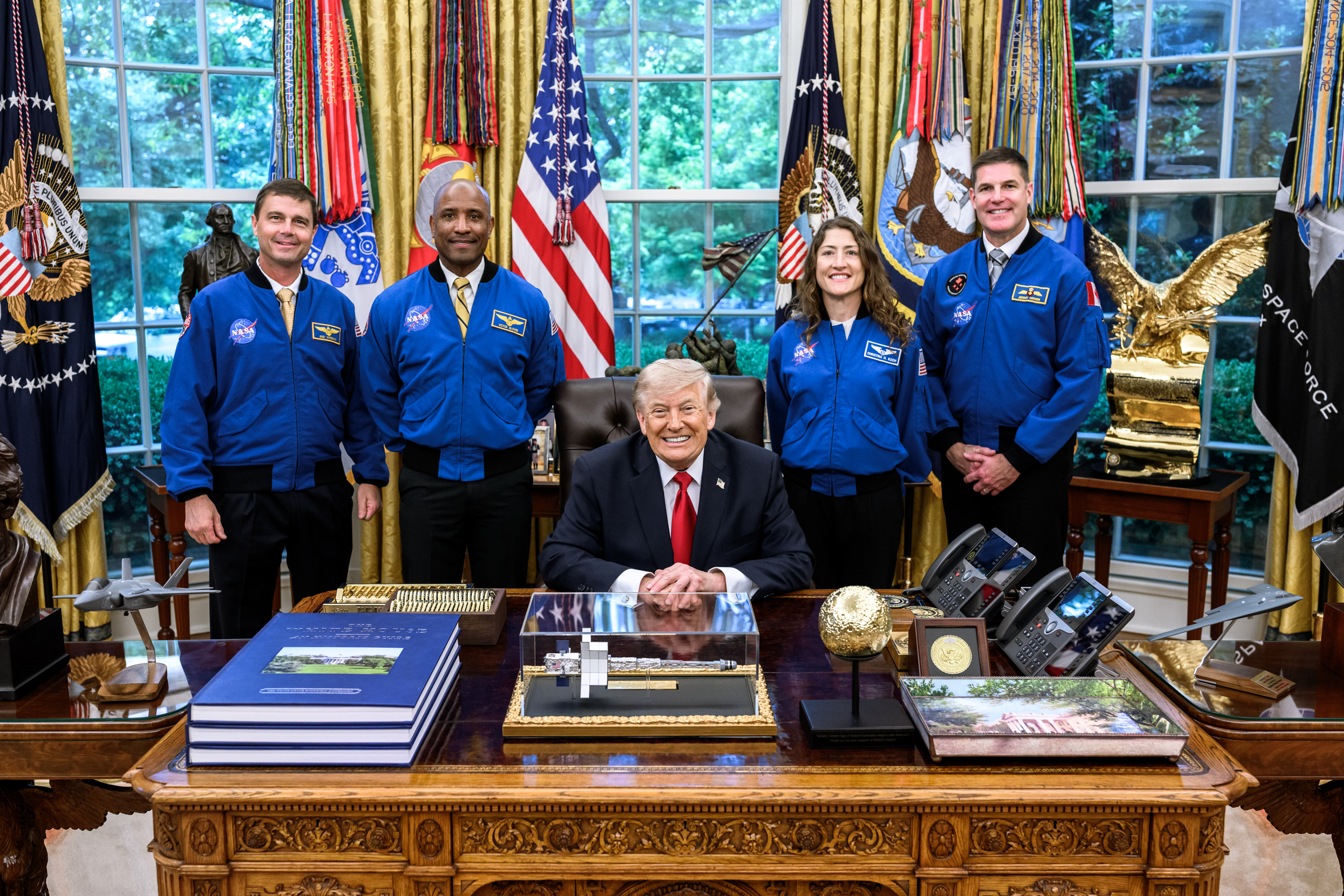
President Donald Trump and the crew of Artemis II in the Oval Office on April 29, 2026

After crew recovery, divers attached a winch line to the capsule and secured additional tending lines. The spacecraft was drawn into a cradle within the ship's well deck, which can be partially flooded to allow the capsule to be brought aboard in the water. The well deck was then drained to secure Orion aboard. Orion was later transported to Naval Base San Diego before transfer to Kennedy Space Center for inspection, data retrieval, refurbishment, and post-flight processing.

Aerial and airborne support included a modified NASA Martin RB-57F Canberra (N926NA), which provided high-altitude video of the landing and recovery, and a Cessna 208 Caravan (N97826), which transmitted live aerial views of the splashdown site. Navy Sikorsky MH-60S Seahawk helicopters supported imaging and recovery operations.

Mission profile animation of Artemis II

Earth-centered inertial reference frame

Earth-centered frame rotating with Moon

Earth · Integrity · Moon

Only one chance in this lifetime, video by Reid Wiseman, commander of the Artemis II mission, of Earthset from the crew's perspective

== Experiments ==
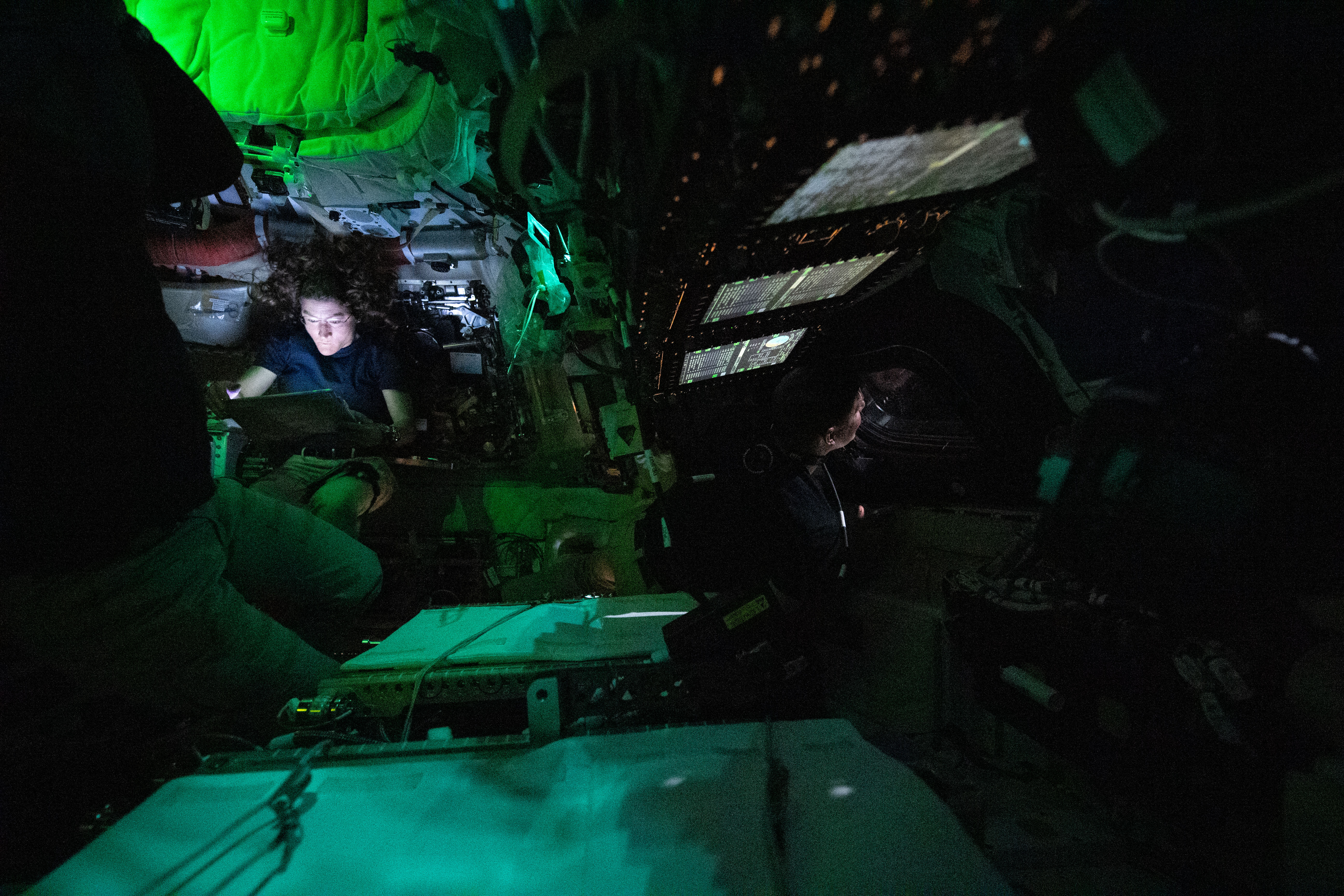
The inside of Integrity and the crew working during flight

=== Deep space technology for humans ===
The mission included a payload titled AVATAR (A Virtual Astronaut Tissue Analog Response) which can mimic individual astronaut organs, marking the first time that AVATAR has been tested outside of the International Space Station and Earth's Van Allen belt. Crew health for this mission was critical for missions in deep space in the future. The mission also included a new payload titled ARCHeR (Artemis Research for Crew Health & Readiness). For ARCHeR, crew members wore movement and sleep monitors before, during, and after the mission to study real-time health and behavioral information for crew members so scientists could study sleep patterns and overall health performance.

Scientists planned to test immunity biomarkers, with crew providing saliva samples before, during, and after the mission to test their immune system and how they were affected by radiation, isolation, and the distance away from Earth during deep space flight. This mission also intended to allow astronauts and scientists to understand space weather that will be faced in future missions, as well as how humans can survive and sustain themselves in space.

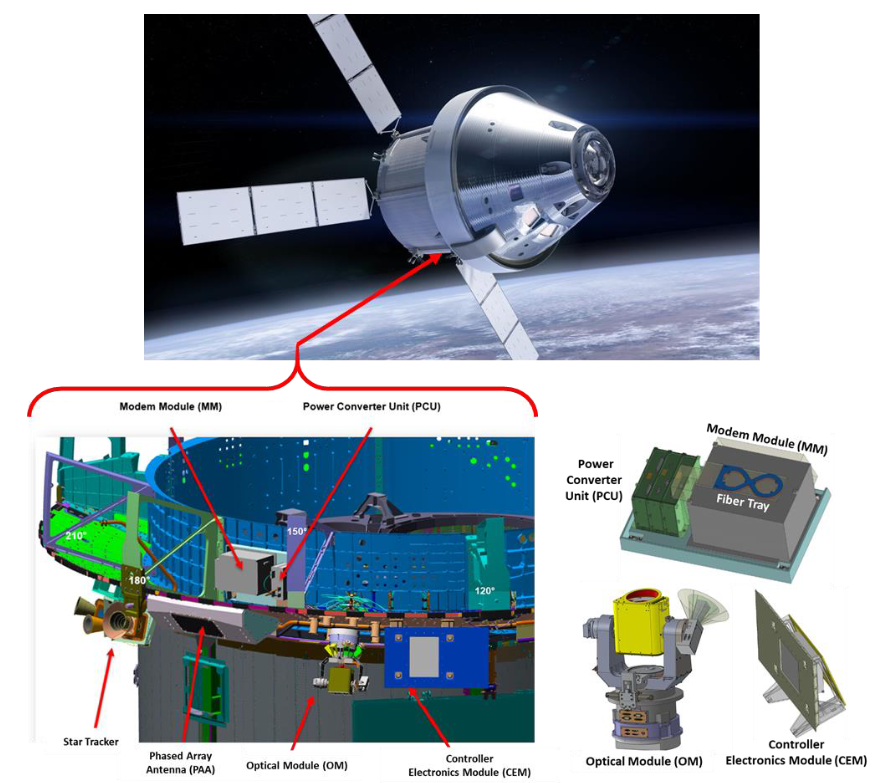
Optical Communications System modules on the Orion spacecraft

=== Optical communications ===
Artemis II tested and demonstrated optical communications to and from Earth using the Orion Artemis II Optical Communications System (O2O), which uses laser beams. Such an optical system is smaller and lighter than conventional radio and can use less power, while increasing the rate of transmission. The O2O hardware is integrated into the Orion spacecraft and included an optical module (a 4-inch [100 mm] telescope and two gimbals), a modem and control electronics. O2O communicated with ground stations in California and New Mexico. The test device sent data to Earth with a downlink rate of up to 260 megabits per second.

=== CubeSat secondary payloads ===
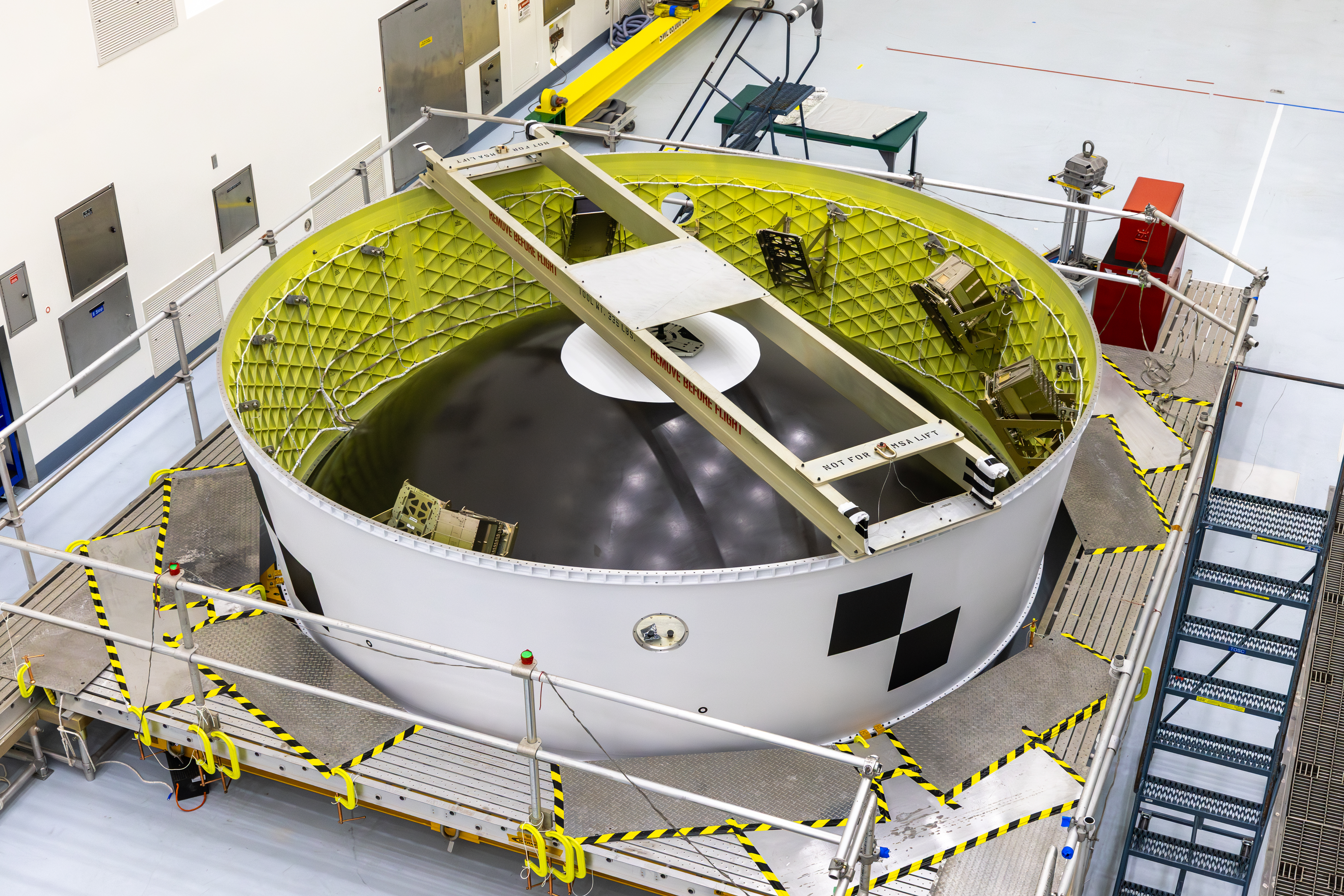
CubeSats Integration

NASA's CubeSat Launch Initiative (CSLI) originally sought proposals in August 2019 from U.S. institutions and companies to fly CubeSat missions as secondary payloads aboard the SLS on the Artemis II mission. NASA planned to accept 6-unit (12 kg, 26 lb) and 12-unit (20 kg, 44 lb) CubeSats, which would be mounted on the inside of the stage adapter ring between the SLS upper stage and the Orion spacecraft, deploying after Orion separated into high Earth orbit. Although selections were initially expected by February 2020, all secondary payloads were removed from the mission plans in October 2021.

In September 2024, NASA announced that it would fly five CubeSats from international partners aboard the Artemis II mission; this was later reduced to four CubeSats. The payloads, selected from nations that are signatories to the Artemis Accords, are intended to advance global scientific and technological research while broadening international access to deep space.

The first CubeSat selected was Germany's TACHELES to examine the impact of space conditions on electrical components used in lunar vehicles. In May 2025, NASA announced that it had selected the ATENEA satellite from Argentina's National Space Activities Commission to study radiation shielding, map the surrounding radiation environment, gather GPS data for mission planning, and test a long-distance communication system. The third and fourth satellites were K-RadCube from the Korea AeroSpace Administration, to study a material simulating human tissue for the effects of space radiation, and SHAMS (or SHMS, also referred to as Space Weather CubeSat-1) which means "Sun" in Arabic, from the Saudi Space Agency to measure aspects of space weather in high Earth orbit. The fifth CubeSat bay was occupied by an avionics unit.

ATENEA, which was never designed to boost itself, burned up after a single orbit, having completed its mission objectives. The other three cubesats were meant to fire propulsion systems to raise their perigee and stay in orbit. However, only SHAMS was successfully able to do so, with the others burning up in the atmosphere.

== Public outreach ==
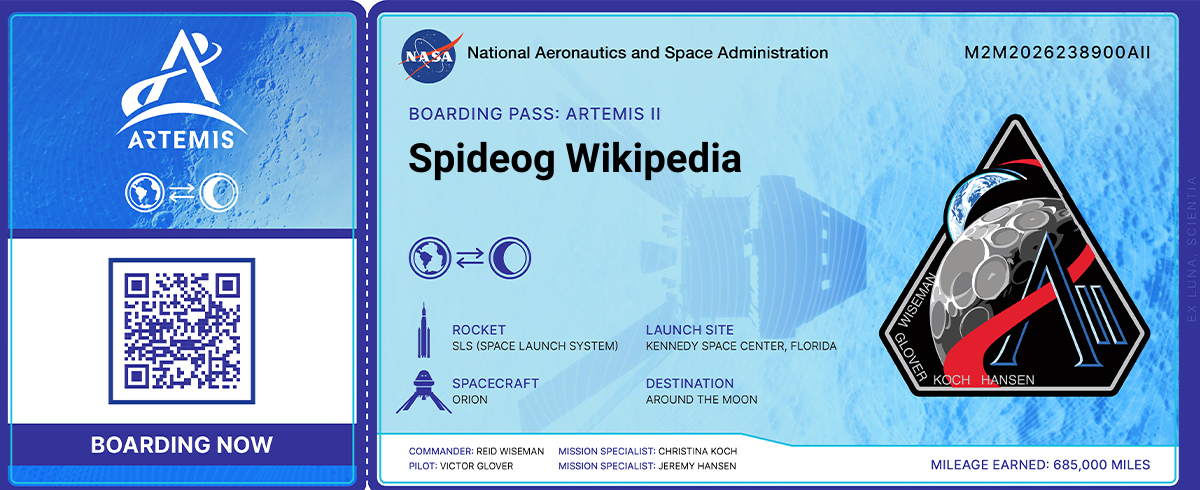
Boarding pass bearing a name that flew around the Moon on the Artemis II mission

To support public outreach, NASA provided an online program allowing members of the public to generate a "boarding pass" for the mission, the names submitted were stored on an SD card subsequently flown on the spacecraft.

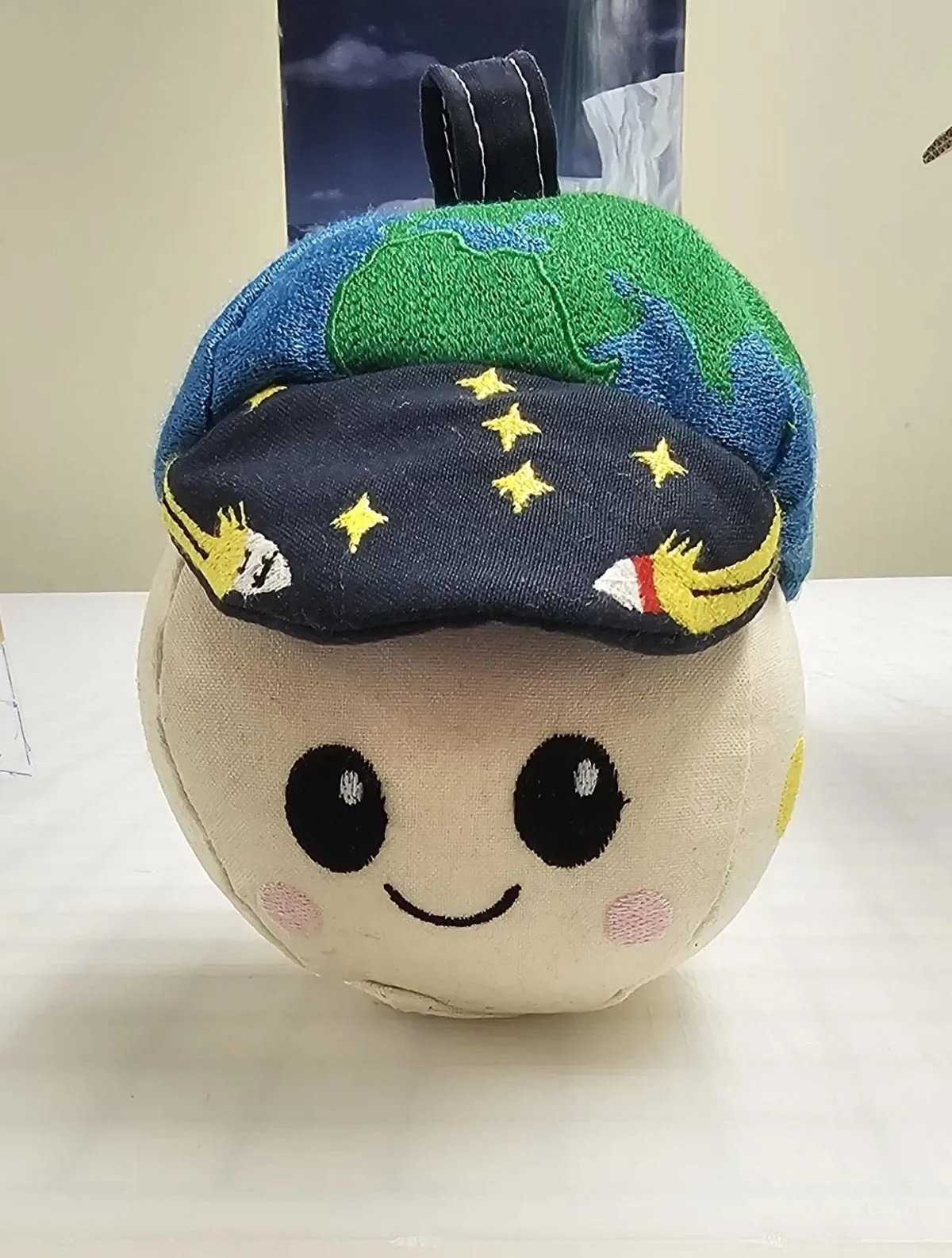
Rise, the zero-gravity indicator

On March 7, 2025, NASA announced the Artemis II zero-gravity indicator (ZGI) design challenge to create a mascot for the mission. The competition received more than 2,600 submissions from over 50 countries, with a total of US$23,275 awarded to the winner and 24 finalists. At a pre-launch ceremony at Kennedy Space Center on March 27, 2026, astronaut Christina Koch announced Rise, designed by eight-year-old Lucas Ye of Mountain View, California, as the winning entry.

Inspired by the Apollo 8 Earthrise photograph, Rise depicts the Moon wearing Earth as a baseball cap. NASA fabricated the plush toy out of flight-safe materials and it was tethered inside the crew cabin. The SD card containing names from the boarding pass program was sewn inside Rise.

At the end of the mission, the crew was supposed to leave Rise in Integrity for later retrieval, but Wiseman said he felt bad leaving it behind, so he placed it inside his dry bag. Rise was displayed by the crew on board the recovery ship and at postflight press conferences. NASA later sold replicas of Rise in response to public demand.

On March 4, 2026, NASA published the astronauts' menu for Artemis II. During launch and landing, the crew could consume only ready-to-eat foods, while in orbit they rehydrated freeze-dried meals using Orion's water dispenser and heated items with a briefcase-style food warmer. The four-person crew selected the menu following preflight taste tests, balancing nutritional requirements with storage constraints. Selected items include 58 tortillas, vegetable quiche, barbecued brisket, and spicy green beans; the menu also incorporated five Canadian products in recognition of Jeremy Hansen, the mission's Canadian crew member. Additional provisions included 43 servings of coffee, five varieties of hot sauce, and condiments such as maple syrup, peanut butter, mustard, jam, honey, and Nutella, of which the jar was seen floating through the Integrity cabin during a live NASA broadcast. Additionally they had snacks like M&M's.

NASA invited people before the launch to participate in citizen science observation of the Moon during the mission, looking out for impact flashes of meteoroids hitting the Moon. These will be compared with the observations made by the crew during their flyby.

== In culture ==
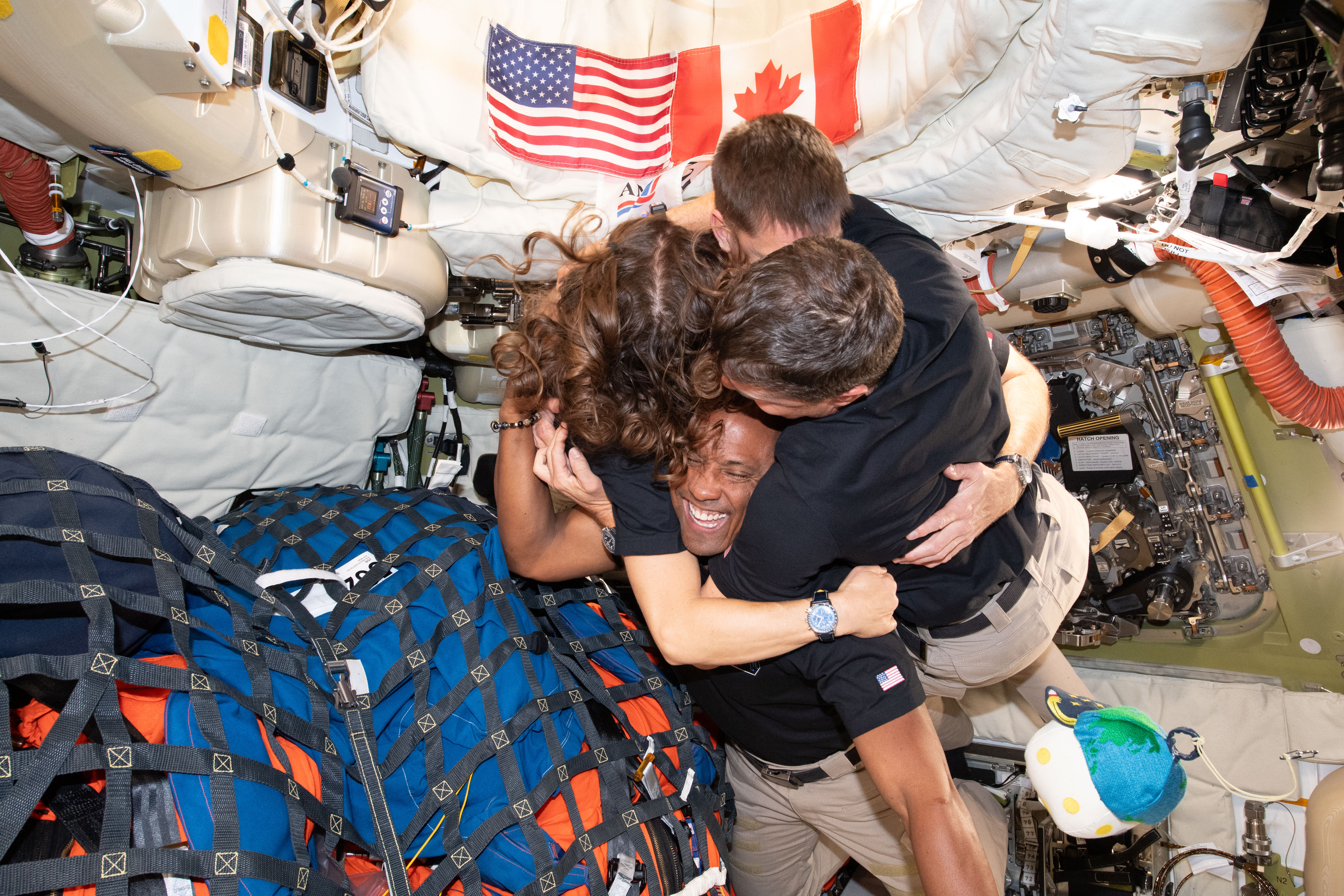
The crew in a group hug with Rise floating nearby. The crew's actions came to be known as Moon joy.

The mission was broadcast by NASA throughout its duration, including live video from the spacecraft and interviews with the crew. During the mission, the crew's live descriptions of their observations and interactions contributed to NASA's use of the term Moon joy, which the agency defined in a social media post as "the feeling of intense happiness and excitement that only comes from a mission to the Moon".

"If you can't take love to the stars, then what are we doing? [...] That's why we send humans instead of robots sometimes, that's why we have that firsthand witness."

— Amit Kshatriya, NASA Associate Administrator

The crew was present and honored during President Trump's America 250 speech on the National Mall on July 4, 2026, along with Apollo 17 crew member Harrison Schmitt, the most recent living person to walk on the Moon. Trump also awarded the crew members the Congressional Space Medal of Honor on August 28, 2026.

=== News coverage and public perception ===
While Artemis II was not widely anticipated prior to launch, worldwide interest increased rapidly after launch. Public engagement during the mission was described as an example of collective effervescence, particularly through the crew's personal and inclusive engagement. The launch of Artemis II was broadcast on several national US TV channels, including MS NOW, ABC, CBS, NBC, Telemundo, CNN, and Fox News, with an estimated 18.1 million viewers in the United States. The splashdown received an estimated 27.17 million US cable TV viewers. NASA's livestream of Artemis II was NASA's biggest until that point, getting 149 million views and breaking a previous record set when the Perseverance rover landed on Mars in 2021. At the time of the mission, only about one-fourth of the global population was old enough to have witnessed the previous crewed mission to the lunar environment, Apollo 17 in 1972.

In U.S. polls by Ipsos and YouGov, most respondents said they had heard about the mission. In the YouGov survey, a majority of those polled felt positively about the mission and thought it was a good use of taxpayer resources.

=== Cultural references ===
The crew has stated that the film Apollo 13 portrayed their kind of spaceflight well, except for the technical problems that Apollo 13 had. In quarantine, the crew watched Project Hail Mary (2026), which was likened by the media to crewed spaceflight programs like Artemis. Ryan Gosling, who played the main character in the film, wished the mission all the best on the NASA live broadcast at launch in a pre-recorded message, joining Scarlett Johansson (Fly Me to the Moon), Stanley Tucci, Victor Wembanyama, Isaac Mattson, and Roy Wood Jr. in sending their regards.

On social media during the mission, an observation by the audience of the NASA live stream gained attention when viewers noticed a white cat plushie of the Sailor Moon character Artemis present at the Kennedy Space Center. It is believed to be the property of Stanley G. Love.

=== Misinformation ===
On social media, many conspiracy theorists shared AI-generated videos of Artemis II and others claimed the mission was fake.

An enhanced photograph of a "colorful Moon" (amplifying the slight color variations in the lunar surface caused by iron and titanium deposits) was spread online and incorrectly attributed to the crew of Artemis II, but was actually taken in August 2025 by Ukrainian amateur astrophotographer Ildar Ibatullin.

== Similar missions ==
NASA has described Artemis II's mission objectives as comparable to those of both Apollo 7 and Apollo 8, combining tests of the spacecraft in both Earth and lunar orbit into a single mission. However, unlike Apollo 8, Artemis II did not enter lunar orbit due to the ESM's performance limitations, which cannot independently depart from low lunar orbit as it does not carry enough propellant (delta-V) for both the insertion into lunar orbit and the subsequent trans-earth injection to return home.

Artemis II was the second crewed flight to turn around the Moon using a free-return trajectory, after Apollo 13 in 1970, which used a free-return trajectory due to an oxygen tank explosion in the command and service module en route to the Moon.

Furthermore, Artemis II was on its way toward the Moon during Easter, sending Easter greetings from cislunar space; similarly, Apollo 8 orbited the Moon during Christmas and sent Christmas greetings from the Moon.

== Mission insignia ==
Comparison of the Apollo 8 and Artemis II mission patches

The Artemis II mission patch, designed by Gregory Manchess, has been interpreted as drawing inspiration from the Apollo 8 patch, which features a vertically oriented infinity symbol alluding to the number 8 and representing the spacecraft's lunar orbit. Similarly, the Artemis II design incorporates a stylized trajectory resembling a half-period curve that subtly evokes the number 2 and corresponds to the first leg of the mission from Earth toward the Moon. The depiction of Earth from beyond the Moon's far side, using a perspective similar to that of the Earthrise photograph from Apollo 8, is descriptive of the mission's distance from Earth. Together, these shared design elements show the parallels between the two missions and support Artemis II's role as the first crewed lunar mission since the Apollo program.

The back side of the mission patch

During the mission, it was revealed that the astronauts had a double-sided version of the patch made. The reverse side, shown during the return to Earth, features an inverted design in which the Earth appears larger and the Moon is shown in the distance.

== Wake-up calls ==
NASA began the tradition of playing music to astronauts during the Gemini program, and first used music to wake up a flight crew during the Apollo 15 mission. Each track is specially chosen, often by the astronauts' families, and usually has a special meaning to an individual member of the crew or is applicable to their daily activities.

Artemis II became the first NASA mission to have its wake-up songs compiled into an official Spotify playlist. Pre-recorded greetings by former Apollo astronauts Charlie Duke and Jim Lovell were also broadcast to the crew, with Lovell recording his message shortly before his death in August 2025.

Spotify stated that several songs chosen as wake-up calls had a sudden increase in global streams following the mission. On April 5, "Sleepyhead" by Young & Sick peaked at a 2,100% increase and "Working Class Heroes (Work)" by CeeLo Green saw an increase of more than 1,700%.

Day	Song	Artist	Greeting
1	"Sleepyhead"	Young & Sick (cover of Passion Pit)	
2	"Green Light"	John Legend, André 3000	
3	"In A Daydream"	Freddy Jones Band	
4	"Pink Pony Club"	Chappell Roan	
5	"Working Class Heroes (Work)"	CeeLo Green	Charlie Duke
6	"Good Morning"	Mandisa, TobyMac	Jim Lovell (posthumous, recording made in August 2025)
7	"Tokyo Drifting"	Denzel Curry, Glass Animals	
8	"Under Pressure"	Queen, David Bowie	
9	"Lonesome Drifter"	Charley Crockett	
10	"Run to the Water"	Live	
10	"Free"	Zac Brown Band	Zac Brown (message accompanying his band's song)

== See also ==
- List of Artemis missions
- List of missions to the Moon
- New Space Race

Preceded by Apollo 13 crew	Human altitude record since 2026	Succeeded by
