= Wiseman (surname) =

Wiseman is a surname. Notable people with the surname include:

- Adele Wiseman (1928–1992), Canadian author
- Al Wiseman (1918–1988), American cartoonist
- Alexander Wiseman, 13th-14th century Scottish nobleman
- Bernard Wiseman (1922–1995), American author and illustrator
- Brady Wiseman (born 1957), American politician
- Brian Wiseman (born 1971), Canadian professional ice hockey forward
- Bob Wiseman (born 1962), Canadian musician, filmmaker, singer-songwriter, actor
- Capel Wiseman, 17th-century English Anglican priest in Ireland
- Caroline Wiseman (born 1954), British art dealer and author
- Carroll Taylor Wiseman (died 2020), American wife of Reid Wiseman and namesake of the lunar crater Carroll
- Chad Wiseman, Canadian ice hockey player
- Chris Wiseman, American guitarist for the deathcore band Shadow of Intent
- Claire Wiseman (born 1965), American psychologist
- Clarence Wiseman (1907–1985), Canadian Salvation Army officer, 10th General of the Salvation Army
- Craig Wiseman, American country music songwriter
- Danny Wiseman (born 1967), American professional bowler
- David Wiseman (born 1981), American artist and designer
- Debbie Wiseman (born 1963), English film and television composer
- Doc Wiseman (1878–1953), American professional baseball player
- Donagh Wiseman (born 1977), Irish Gaelic football player
- Donald Wiseman (1918–2010) English professor, archeologist and writer
- Douglas Wiseman (1930–2020), Canadian politician
- Eddie Wiseman (1911–1977), Canadian ice hockey forward
- Elizabeth Wiseman (1647–1730), English noblewoman and litigant
- Eric C. Wiseman (born 1955), American businessman
- Ernest Wiseman (1925–1999), English comedian as "Ernie Wise"
- Fred J. Wiseman (1875–1961), American aviation pioneer and race car driver
- Frederick Wiseman (1930–2026), American film director
- Gary Wiseman, American drummer for the rock band Bowling for Soup
- Hilda Wiseman (1894–1982), New Zealand bookplate designer
- Howard M. Wiseman (born 1968), Australian theoretical quantum physicist
- James Wiseman (born 2001), American basketball player
- Jay Wiseman (1949–2026), American BDSM author
- Jeff Wiseman (born 1950), Australian Paralympic athlete
- Jessica Wiseman (born 1992), Canadian curler
- Jennifer Wiseman, American astronomer
- Joseph Wiseman (1918–2009), Canadian actor
- Julie Wiseman (died 2018), Australian cricketer as "Julie Kaatz"
- Kendra Wiseman, American counselor for ex-Scientologists
- Len Wiseman (born 1973), American film director and screenwriter
- Leonard Albert Wiseman (1915–2009), British chemist and scientific administrator
- Liz Wiseman (born 1964), American executive advisor
- Lofty Wiseman, British author and survival consultant
- Lois Wiseman, Canadian political candidate
- Loren Wiseman (1951–2017), American game designer
- Mac Wiseman (1925–2019), American bluegrass singer
- Malcolm Wiseman (1913–1993), Canadian basketball player and Olympian
- Margaret Wiseman, Scottish female curler
- Mark Wiseman (born 1970), Canadian lawyer, businessman, and diplomat
- Merilyn Wiseman (1941–2019), New Zealand potter
- Merv Wiseman, Canadian maritime rescue coordinator and political candidate
- Michael Wiseman, American television and film actor
- Michael Wiseman (rower) (born 1977), Australian lightweight rower
- Nathanael Wiseman, English actor, film director, and film producer
- Neil Wiseman (1934–1995), British computer scientist
- Nicholas Wiseman (1802–1865), Cardinal Archbishop of Westminster
- Paul Wiseman (born 1970), New Zealand cricketer
- Paula Wiseman, children's book publisher and founder of Paula Wiseman Books
- Rachael Wiseman, British analytic philosopher
- Ralph Wiseman, Canadian politician
- Reid Wiseman (born 1975), American naval aviator, NASA astronaut and the commander of the 2026 Artemis II lunar flyby mission
- Rhett Wiseman (born 1994), American baseball player
- Richard Wiseman (born 1966), English psychology professor
- Robert Wiseman (1916–2004), Scottish businessman
- Robert S. Wiseman (1924–2013), American electrical engineer and night vision ppioneer
- Rochelle Humes (née Wiseman) (born 1989), British singer
- Rosalind Wiseman (born 1969), American educator and author
- Ross Wiseman (born 1953), Canadian politician
- Sara Wiseman, New Zealand actress
- Shari Wiseman, American neuroscientist and magazine editor
- Solomon Wiseman (1777–1838), Australian convict, merchant and shipowner
- Somerset M. Wiseman Clarke (1830–1905), British Army officer and Acting Governor of Jamaica
- T. P. Wiseman (born 1940), British classical scholar
- Theresa Wiseman (born 1956), English footballer and animator
- Thomas Wiseman (1931–2018), British author, playwright, and screenwriter
- Thomas A. Wiseman Jr. (1930–2020), American district court judge
- Tina Wiseman (1965–2005), American actress
- Todd Wiseman Jr. (born 1987), American filmmaker and film producer
- Zoe Wiseman (born 1970), American fine art nude photographer and model

== Disambiguation pages ==
- Beth Wiseman (disambiguation)
- Fred Wiseman (disambiguation)
- James Wiseman (disambiguation)
- Jane Wiseman (disambiguation)
- John Wiseman (disambiguation)
- Mary Wiseman (disambiguation)
- Scott Wiseman (disambiguation)
- William Wiseman (disambiguation)

== Fictional characters ==
- Wiseman, an alias for Death Phantom in the manga series Sailor Moon
- Bernard Wiseman, a character from the OVA series Mobile Suit Gundam 0080: War in the Pocket

== See also ==
- Weissmann, surname
