= Integrity (crater) =

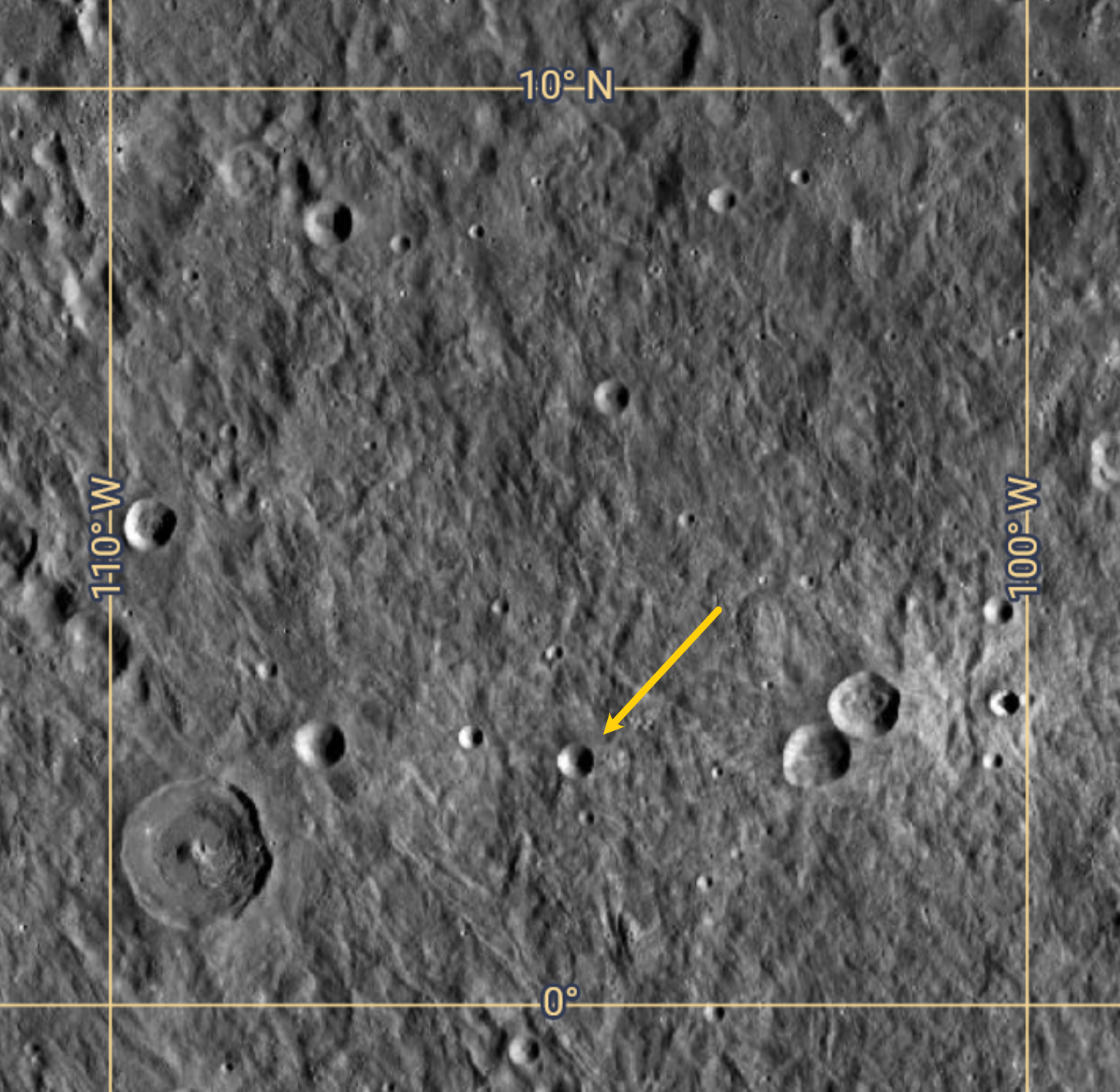
- Possible location of Integrity crater, just northwest of Orientale basin.
- Coordinates: 2.675°N 104.928°W
- Diameter: 6 km (3.7 mi)
- Eponym: Orion CM-003 Integrity

Integrity is a lunar impact crater. It was unofficially named on April 6, 2026 by the crew of the Artemis II mission during their historic flyby of the Moon.

== Naming ==
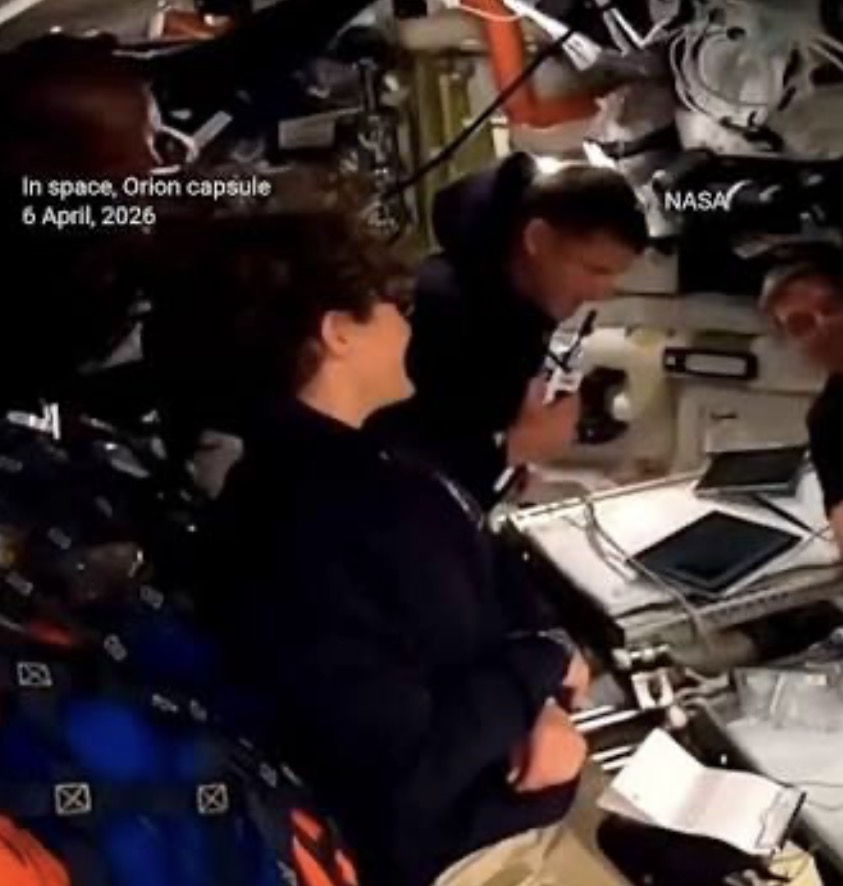
The Artemis II crew aboard the Integrity/Orion spacecraft—Reid Wiseman, Victor Glover, Christina Koch, and Jeremy Hansen—announce the naming of Integrity Crater and Carroll Crater during a live NASA broadcast.

The crater was designated to honor the historic mission by naming it after Integrity, the Artemis II Orion spacecraft. It was named just moments after the crew set the record for the farthest distance from Earth ever traveled by humans.

The crater name proposal is set to be submitted to the International Astronomical Union for official review and adoption.

== Location on the Moon ==
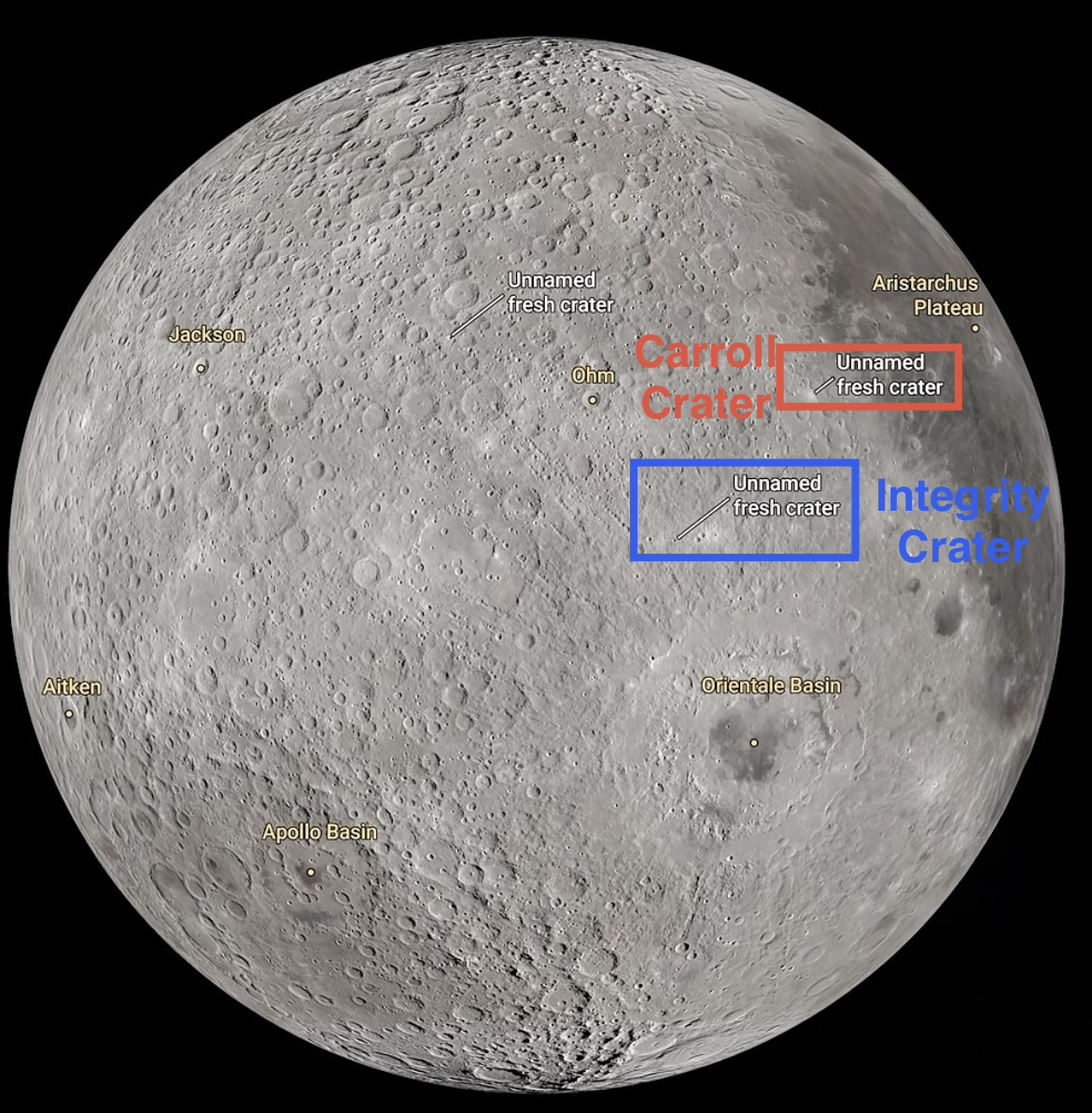
NASA image showing newly formed lunar craters as of April 6, 2026. The red marker highlights Carroll crater, and the blue marker indicates Integrity crater. These two features were informally named that same day aboard the Integrity/Orion spacecraft during the Artemis II mission.

The crater is located just northwest of the Orientale basin.

== See also ==
- Carroll (crater), the other crater named by the crew of Artemis II
