= List of people who have flown to the Moon =

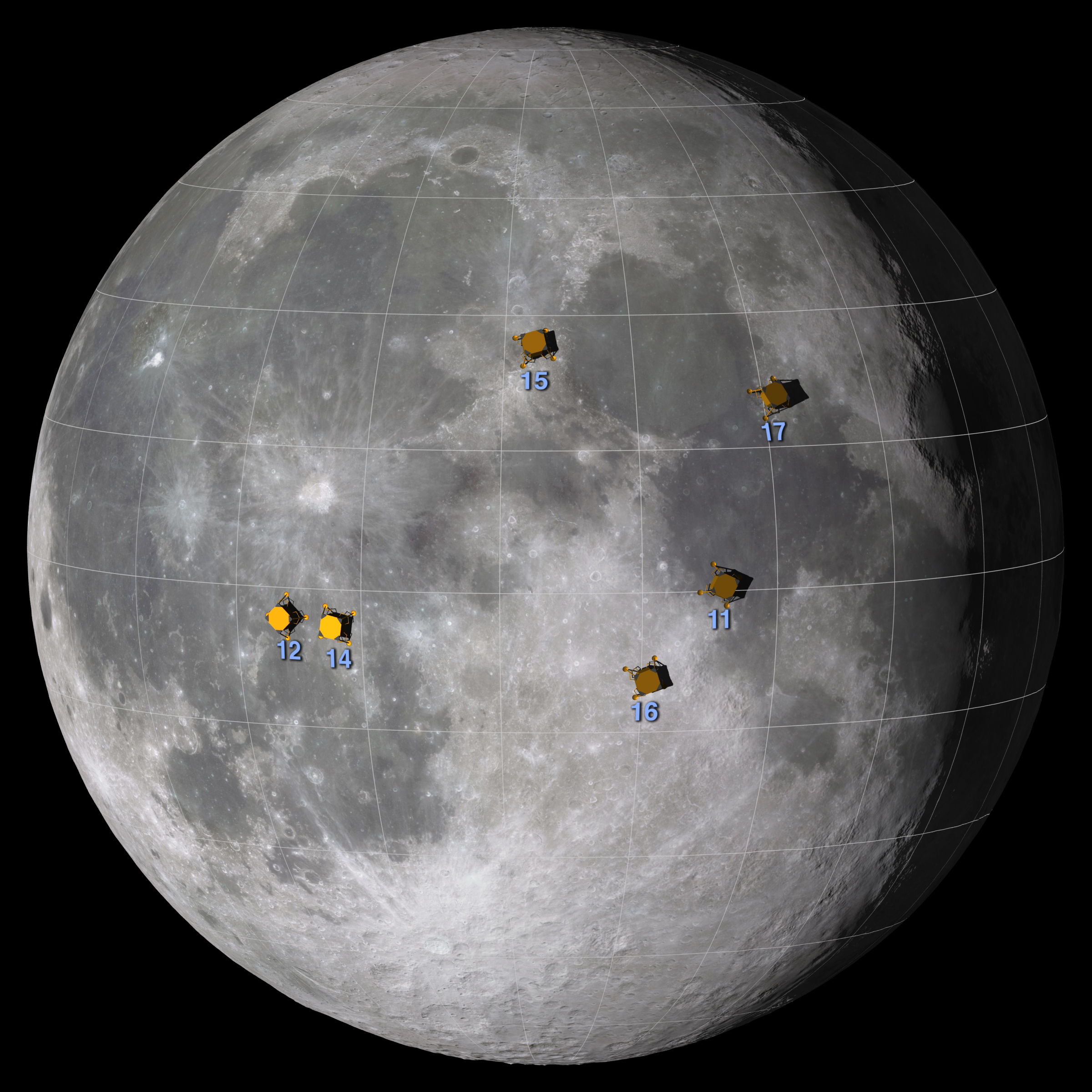
The Apollo program's six landing sites on the Moon's near side

Twenty-eight people have traveled to or around the Moon, including 12 who landed and walked on the surface, 10 who orbited without landing, and seven who flew by the Moon without orbiting or landing (one of whom had orbited on a previous mission). These 28 are the only astronauts to have traveled beyond low Earth orbit.

Between December 1968 and December 1972, the NASA Apollo program sent 24 astronauts on nine crewed lunar missions. Six of the missions landed two astronauts each on the lunar surface, while Apollo 8 and Apollo 10 orbited without landing. Apollo 13's planned lunar landing was aborted due to an oxygen tank explosion en route to the Moon; instead, the crew looped around the Moon 158 miles above its surface without entering orbit. Three astronauts reached the Moon twice: Jim Lovell orbited the Moon on Apollo 8 and later flew on Apollo 13; John Young and Eugene Cernan both orbited the Moon on Apollo 10 and landed on separate missions.

In April 2026, NASA's Artemis II carried four astronauts on a circumlunar flyby, including the first woman, first Black man, and first Canadian. They passed by the Moon 6,545 km (4,067 miles) from the surface without entering orbit.

The twelve people who landed on the Moon were all American men. The first were Neil Armstrong and Buzz Aldrin in July 1969, and the most recent were Eugene Cernan and Harrison Schmitt in December 1972. All crewed lunar landings have been part of the Apollo program.

== Missions summary ==
Designation	Date	LV	CSM	LM	Crew	Summary
Apollo 8	December 21–27, 1968	Saturn V SA-503	CSM-103	LTA-B	(United States) Frank Borman; (United States) James Lovell; (United States) William Anders	First crewed flight of Saturn V; First crewed flight to Moon; First people to orbit the Moon; CSM made 10 lunar orbits in 20 hours.
Apollo 10	May 18–26, 1969	Saturn V SA-505	CSM-106; Charlie Brown	LM-4; Snoopy	(United States) Thomas Stafford; (United States) John Young; (United States) Eugene Cernan	Dress rehearsal for first lunar landing; flew LM down to 50,000 ft (15 km; 9.5 mi) from lunar surface. Highest speed attained by a crewed vehicle relative to the Earth's surface. Atmospheric reentry at 39,897 km/h (11.08 km/s or 24,791 mph).
Apollo 11	July 16–24, 1969	Saturn V SA-506	CSM-107; Columbia	LM-5; Eagle	(United States) Neil Armstrong; (United States) Buzz Aldrin; (United States) Michael Collins	First people to walk on the Moon. First landing, in Tranquility Base, Sea of Tranquility. Surface EVA time: 2h 31m. Samples returned: 47.51 lb (21.55 kg).
Apollo 12	November 14–24, 1969	Saturn V SA-507	CSM-108; Yankee Clipper	LM-6; Intrepid	(United States) Pete Conrad; (United States) Alan Bean; (United States) Richard Gordon	Second landing, in Ocean of Storms near Surveyor 3. Surface EVA time: 7h 45m. Samples returned: 75.62 lb (34.30 kg).
Apollo 13	April 11–17, 1970	Saturn V SA-508	CSM-109; Odyssey	LM-7; Aquarius	(United States) James Lovell; (United States) Fred Haise; (United States) Jack Swigert	First crewed lunar flyby without entering orbit; intended third landing mission aborted in transit to the Moon, due to SM failure. Crew used LM as "lifeboat" to return to Earth. Mission called a "successful failure". Greatest distance from Earth reached by a crewed mission until Artemis II (400,171 km).
Apollo 14	January 31 – Feb 9, 1971	Saturn V SA-509	CSM-110; Kitty Hawk	LM-8; Antares	(United States) Alan Shepard; (United States) Edgar Mitchell; (United States) Stuart Roosa	Third landing, in Fra Mauro formation. Surface EVA time: 9h 21m. Samples returned: 94.35 lb (42.80 kg).
Apollo 15	July 26 – Aug 7, 1971	Saturn V SA-510	CSM-112; Endeavour	LM-10; Falcon	(United States) David Scott; (United States) James Irwin; (United States) Alfred Worden	Fourth landing, in Hadley-Apennine. First extended mission, used Rover on Moon. Surface EVA time: 18h 33m. Samples returned: 169.10 lb (76.70 kg).
Apollo 16	April 16–27, 1972	Saturn V SA-511	CSM-113; Casper	LM-11; Orion	(United States) John Young; (United States) Charles Duke; (United States) Ken Mattingly	Fifth landing, in Plain of Descartes. Second extended mission, used Rover on Moon. Surface EVA time: 20h 14m. Samples returned: 207.89 lb (94.30 kg).
Apollo 17	December 7–19, 1972	Saturn V SA-512	CSM-114; America	LM-12; Challenger	(United States) Eugene Cernan; (United States) Harrison Schmitt; (United States) Ronald Evans	Sixth landing, in Taurus–Littrow. Only Saturn V night launch. Third extended mission, used Rover on Moon. First geologist on the Moon. Longest crewed lunar mission. Most recent crewed Moon landing. Most recent crewed lunar orbit. Surface EVA time: 22h 2m. Samples returned: 243.40 lb (110.40 kg).
Artemis II	April 1–11, 2026	SLS Block 1	CM-003; Integrity	—N/a	(United States) Reid Wiseman; (United States) Victor Glover; (United States) Christina Koch; (Canada) Jeremy Hansen	First woman, Black man, non-American, and oldest person to fly around the Moon; First flight around the Moon since 1972. First crewed flight of Space Launch System (SLS). First four-person flight beyond Earth orbit. First crewed flight of SLS Block 1. Greatest distance from Earth reached by a crewed mission (406,771 km).

== People who walked on the Moon ==
Birthplaces of astronauts who walked on the Moon

	Portrait	Name and group	Born	Died	Age at first step	Mission	Lunar Module Landing Time (UTC)	Lunar Module Ascent Time (UTC)	Elapsed Time on Lunar Surface	Lunar EVA dates (UTC)	Lunar EVAs	Total EVA duration	Astronaut service
1		Neil Armstrong (NASA Astronaut Group 2)	August 5, 1930	August 25, 2012 (aged 82)	38y 11m 15d	Apollo 11	July 20, 1969 at 20:17	July 21, 1969 at 17:54	21 hours 37 minutes	July 21, 1969	1	2 hours 31 minutes	NASA
2		Buzz Aldrin (NASA Astronaut Group 3)	January 20, 1930 (age 96)		39y 6m 0d	Apollo 11	July 20, 1969 at 20:17	July 21, 1969 at 17:54	21 hours 37 minutes	July 21, 1969	1	2 hours 31 minutes	US Air Force
3		Pete Conrad (NASA Astronaut Group 2)	June 2, 1930	July 8, 1999 (aged 69)	39y 5m 17d	Apollo 12	November 19, 1969 at 6:54	November 20, 1969 at 14:25	1 day 7 hours 31 minutes	November 19–20, 1969	2	7 hours 45 minutes	US Navy
4		Alan Bean (NASA Astronaut Group 3)	March 15, 1932	May 26, 2018 (aged 86)	37y 8m 4d	Apollo 12	November 19, 1969 at 6:54	November 20, 1969 at 14:25	1 day 7 hours 31 minutes	November 19–20, 1969	2	7 hours 45 minutes	US Navy
5		Alan Shepard (Mercury Seven)	November 18, 1923	July 21, 1998 (aged 74)	47y 2m 18d	Apollo 14	February 5, 1971 at 9:18	February 6, 1971 at 18:48	1 day 9 hours 30 minutes	February 5–6, 1971	2	9 hours 21 minutes	US Navy
6		Edgar Mitchell (NASA Astronaut Group 5)	September 17, 1930	February 4, 2016 (aged 85)	40y 4m 19d	Apollo 14	February 5, 1971 at 9:18	February 6, 1971 at 18:48	1 day 9 hours 30 minutes	February 5–6, 1971	2	9 hours 21 minutes	US Navy
7		David Scott (NASA Astronaut Group 3)	June 6, 1932 (age 94)		39y 1m 25d	Apollo 15	July 30, 1971 at 22:16	August 2, 1971 at 17:11	2 days 18 hours 55 minutes	July 31–August 2, 1971	3	18 hours 33 minutes	US Air Force
8		James Irwin (NASA Astronaut Group 5)	March 17, 1930	August 8, 1991 (aged 61)	41y 4m 14d	Apollo 15	July 30, 1971 at 22:16	August 2, 1971 at 17:11	2 days 18 hours 55 minutes	July 31–August 2, 1971	3	18 hours 33 minutes	US Air Force
9		John Young (NASA Astronaut Group 2)	September 24, 1930	January 5, 2018 (aged 87)	41y 6m 28d	Apollo 16	April 21, 1972 at 2:23	April 24, 1972 at 1:25	2 days 23 hours 2 minutes	April 21–23, 1972	3	20 hours 14 minutes	US Navy
10		Charles Duke (NASA Astronaut Group 5)	October 3, 1935 (age 91)		36y 6m 18d	Apollo 16	April 21, 1972 at 2:23	April 24, 1972 at 1:25	2 days 23 hours 2 minutes	April 21–23, 1972	3	20 hours 14 minutes	US Air Force
11		Eugene Cernan (NASA Astronaut Group 3)	March 14, 1934	January 16, 2017 (aged 82)	38y 9m 7d	Apollo 17	December 11, 1972 at 19:54	December 14, 1972 at 22:54	3 days 3 hours 0 minutes	December 11–14, 1972	3	22 hours 2 minutes	US Navy
12		Harrison Schmitt (NASA Astronaut Group 4)	July 3, 1935 (age 91)		37y 5m 8d	Apollo 17	December 11, 1972 at 19:54	December 14, 1972 at 22:54	3 days 3 hours 0 minutes	December 11–14, 1972	3	22 hours 2 minutes	NASA

== People who flew around the Moon without landing ==
Birthplaces of astronauts who flew by or orbited the Moon without landing.
Apollo Artemis II (Note: Michael Collins was born in Rome, Italy; William Anders was born in Hong Kong.)

=== Orbited the Moon without landing ===
	Portrait	Name and group	Born	Died	Age at orbit	Mission	Astronaut service	Notes
1		Frank Borman (NASA Astronaut Group 2)	March 14, 1928	November 7, 2023 (aged 95)	40	Apollo 8 December 21–27, 1968	US Air Force	
2		Jim Lovell (NASA Astronaut Group 2)	March 25, 1928	August 7, 2025 (aged 97)	40	Apollo 8 December 21–27, 1968	US Navy	Also flew by the Moon on Apollo 13.
3		Bill Anders (NASA Astronaut Group 3)	October 17, 1933	June 7, 2024 (aged 90)	35	Apollo 8 December 21–27, 1968	US Air Force	Photographed Earthrise, youngest person to fly around the Moon
4		Tom Stafford (NASA Astronaut Group 2)	September 17, 1930	March 18, 2024 (aged 93)	38	Apollo 10 May 18–26, 1969	US Air Force	Later flew on Apollo–Soyuz Test Project.
5		Michael Collins (NASA Astronaut Group 3)	October 31, 1930	April 28, 2021 (aged 90)	38	Apollo 11 July 16–24, 1969	US Air Force	
6		Dick Gordon (NASA Astronaut Group 3)	October 5, 1929	November 6, 2017 (aged 88)	40	Apollo 12 November 14–24, 1969	US Navy	Trained to land, slated for Apollo 18 (canceled).
7		Stuart Roosa (NASA Astronaut Group 5)	August 16, 1933	December 12, 1994 (aged 61)	37	Apollo 14 January 31 – February 9, 1971	US Air Force	In rotation to land on Apollo 20 (canceled).
8		Alfred Worden (NASA Astronaut Group 5)	February 7, 1932	March 18, 2020 (aged 88)	39	Apollo 15 July 26 – August 7, 1971	US Air Force	
9		Ken Mattingly (NASA Astronaut Group 5)	March 17, 1936	October 31, 2023 (aged 87)	36	Apollo 16 April 16–27, 1972	US Navy	Later flew two Space Shuttle missions.
10		Ronald Evans (NASA Astronaut Group 5)	November 10, 1933	April 7, 1990 (aged 56)	39	Apollo 17 December 7–19, 1972	US Navy	

=== Flew by the Moon ===
	Portrait	Name and group	Born	Died	Age at flyby	Mission	Astronaut service	Notes
1		Jim Lovell (NASA Astronaut Group 2)	March 25, 1928	August 7, 2025 (aged 97)	42	Apollo 13; April 11–17, 1970	US Navy	Intended to land; only person to reach the Moon twice without landing.
2		Fred Haise (NASA Astronaut Group 5)	November 14, 1933 (age 93)		36	Apollo 13 April 11–17, 1970	Marines, US Air Force	Intended to land; later trained to land and slated to command Apollo 19 (canceled); flew the Space Shuttle on approach / landing tests.
3		Jack Swigert (NASA Astronaut Group 5)	August 30, 1931	December 27, 1982 (aged 51)	38	Apollo 13 April 11–17, 1970	US Air Force	
4		Reid Wiseman (NASA Astronaut Group 20)	November 11, 1975 (age 51)		50	Artemis II April 1–10, 2026	US Navy	Oldest person to fly around the Moon
5		Victor Glover (NASA Astronaut Group 21)	April 30, 1976 (age 50)		49	Artemis II April 1–10, 2026	US Navy	Only person of color to fly around the Moon.
6		Christina Koch (NASA Astronaut Group 21)	January 29, 1979 (age 47)		47	Artemis II April 1–10, 2026	NASA	Only woman to fly around the Moon.
7		Jeremy Hansen (NASA Astronaut Group 20)	January 27, 1976 (age 50)		50	Artemis II April 1–10, 2026	Royal Canadian Air Force	Only Canadian and non-U.S. citizen to fly around the Moon.

== See also ==
- List of Apollo astronauts
- List of Artemis astronauts

== Notes ==
Notes

== Sources ==
- Chaikin, Andrew (2007) [1994]. A Man on the Moon: The Voyages of the Apollo Astronauts. London: Penguin Books. ISBN 978-0-14-311235-8. OCLC 958200469.
- Hansen, James R. (2012). First Man: The Life of Neil A. Armstrong. New York: Simon & Schuster. ISBN 978-1-4767-2781-3. OCLC 1029741947.
- Orloff, Richard W. (2000). Apollo by the Numbers: A Statistical Reference. NASA History Series. Washington, DC: NASA History Division, Office of Policy and Plans. ISBN 978-0-16-050631-4. LCCN 00061677. OCLC 829406439. NASA SP-2000-4029.
- Thompson, Neal (2004). Light This Candle: The Life & Times of Alan Shepard, America's First Spaceman (1st ed.). New York: Crown Publishers. ISBN 0-609-61001-5. LCCN 2003015688. OCLC 52631310.
