= Weizmann =

Weizmann or Weizman may refer to:

- Weizmann (surname)
- Weizmann Institute of Science, a university in Rehovot, Israel
  - Weizmann Women & Science Award
  - Weizmann Award in the Sciences and Humanities, received for example by Jacob Rothschild, 4th Baron Rothschild
- Weizman Shiry (born 1956), Israeli politician

== See also ==
- Weitsman, a surname, a variant of Weizmann
- WEIZAC (Weizmann Automatic Computer), the first computer in Israel
- Weizmann House, of the first President of Israel, Chaim Weizmann, and Vera Weizmann
- Weizmann organism (Clostridium acetobutylicum), a commercially valuable bacterium
  - Weizmann process, a process that uses bacterial fermentation
- Weizmann Prize for Exact Sciences, received for example by Yonina Eldar
- Weizmannia, a genus of bacteria
