= Guo-li Ming =

Chinese-American neuroscientist

- Born: Wuhan, China
- Spouse: Hongjun Song

Academic background
- Education: MD, 1994, Tongji Medical College; PhD, Biology, 2002, University of California, San Diego

Guo-li Ming is a Chinese-American neuroscientist. She is the Perelman Professor of Neuroscience and a member of the Institute of Regenerative Medicine at the University of Pennsylvania. In 2019, Ming was elected to the National Academy of Medicine for "pioneering the use of patient-derived human stem cells to model genetic and environmental risk for brain disorders, which has transformed our understanding of underlying mechanisms and potential therapeutic strategies."

== Early life and education ==
Ming completed her medical degree with a specialization in child and maternal care at Tongji Medical College in 1994 before moving to the United States and enrolling at the University of California, San Diego for her PhD in biology. Upon arriving in North America, Ming originally planned on taking the medical board exams but found the research of her husband more interesting. Upon completing her PhD, Ming conducted her postdoctoral training at the Salk Institute for Biological Studies.

== Career ==
Following her postdoctoral training, Ming became an assistant professor at the Johns Hopkins School of Medicine (JHU) in 2003. In this role, she received a 2005 Klingenstein Fellowship Award in Neuroscience to fund her research project "Mechanisms of Nerve Growth and Guidance in the Adult Brain." She continued this research throughout her tenure at JHU and her laboratory made numerous discoveries. Her research team discovered adult neural stem cells that are capable of self-renewal and multipotent fates. They also identified the first molecular mechanism regulating active DNA demethylation in adult neurons. In 2011, Ming focused her research on Schizophrenia as she expanded on the genetic analysis conducted by Russell L. Margolis and Christopher A. Ross. She used various skin biopsy samples of family members affected with schizophrenia to develop a technique to reprogram the cells with the risk gene. She later co-led a research team that revealed that combination of schizophrenia-risk genes and environmental stress right after birth could increase the likelihood of one developing schizophrenia by nearly one and a half times. Later in 2011, Ming and Song found definitive evidence suggesting that DNA demethylation happens in non-dividing neurons. This discovery confirmed that DNA methylation changes occurred independently of cell division.

During the 2015–16 Zika virus epidemic, Ming and Song began studying how the virus caused brain damage. They found that the virus was most dangerous in the first trimester of pregnancy and even low doses of the virus for short periods of time could cause damage. They then used human skin cells to create a forebrain organoid with which to study the Zika virus. In 2017, Ming and Song left JHU to become professors in the department of Neuroscience in the Perelman School of Medicine at the University of Pennsylvania.

In 2019, Ming was elected to the National Academy of Medicine for "pioneering the use of patient-derived human stem cells to model genetic and environmental risk for brain disorders, which has transformed our understanding of underlying mechanisms and potential therapeutic strategies."

== Personal life ==
Ming met her husband Hongjun Song while they were both growing up in Wuhan, China. They have two children together, a son and daughter. Their son Max created illustrations depicting his parents research for the covers of Nature Neuroscience and The Journal of Neuroscience.
