= Hongjun Song =

Chinese-American neuroscientist and stem cell biologist

- Born: China
- Spouse: Guo-li Ming

Academic background
- Education: BSc, Biology, 1992, Peking University; MA, MPhil, Biology, 1995, Columbia University; PhD, Biology, 1998, University of California, San Diego

Hongjun Song is a Chinese-American neurologist and stem cell biologist. He is the Perelman Professor of Neuroscience in the Perelman School of Medicine's Department of Neuroscience and co-director of the Institute for Regenerative Mediacine Neurodevelopment and Regeneration Program. In 2020, Song was elected a Member of the National Academy of Medicine for "revealing unexpected dynamics and plasticity of the neuronal epigenome, as well as its functions under physiological and pathological conditions."

== Early life and education ==
Song completed his Bachelor of Science degree in Biology at Peking University in 1992 before moving to North America and enrolling at Columbia University for his Master of Science degree. He graduated from Columbia in 1995 and he subsequently enrolled at the University of California, San Diego for his PhD in Biology.

== Career ==
Following his PhD, Song became an assistant professor of neurology at Johns Hopkins University's Institute for Cell Engineering (ICE) and its Program for Neuroregeneration and Repair (NeuroICE). In this role, he studied how stem cells self-renewed and how adult nerve stem cells become nerves. In 2006, he received the McKnight Scholar Award to help him establish an independent laboratory. The following year, he led a research team that tracked the chemical signals received by newly made nerve cells in adult mice hippocampus. They found that month-old hippocampal nerves shared similar activity to nerves in a developing child. As a result of his research into understanding how adult neural stem cells mature, Song was named the co-recipient of the 2008 Young Investigator Award from the Society for Neuroscience. In 2009, he participated in a research team that used the drug mTOR to rescue impaired nerve cells found damaged in patients suffering from schizophrenia.

Song's research broke out in 2011 as he oversaw a research team concerned with DNA chemical changes as they related to cancers, psychiatric disorders and neurodegenerative diseases. His team found that the presence or absence of a methyl group at specific locations chemically alters DNA and changes the expression of the genes. Following this discovery, his research team also determined that DNA modifications in non-dividing brain cells were not as stable as previously thought. They found that the cells underwent large-scale dynamic changes as a result of stimulated brain activity. In 2013, Song explored the relationship between various antidepressant drugs and the protein sFRP3. He found that the therapies and drugs commonly used to combat depression specifically altered the amount of sFRP3 in the brain. His research team found that there were three variations of the gene that demonstrated better response to therapy because they undergo less gene activity. Song also collaborated with his wife Guo-li Ming to link 15q11.2 variations and their effect on the developing brain. They found that variations of the genome labelled 15q11.2 were linked to schizophrenia and autism. The loss of 15q11.2 alters the skeletons of developing brain cells, which in turn disrupts the orderly layers those cells would normally form. As a result of his research success, Song was recognized by Thomson Reuters as being among the most influential researcher in his field in 2014.

During the 2015–16 Zika virus epidemic, Song continued to collaborate with Ming as they produced the first direct evidence that Zika causes microcephaly by selectively attacking brain-building stem cells. The husband and wife pair were soon recruited by the Perelman School of Medicine at the University of Pennsylvania to become full professors in their Department of Neuroscience.

In 2020, Song was elected a Member of the National Academy of Medicine for "revealing unexpected dynamics and plasticity of the neuronal epigenome, as well as its functions under physiological and pathological conditions." The following year, he was also elected a Fellow of the American Association for the Advancement of Science for his studies into "how epigenetic and epitranscriptomic mechanisms impact neurodevelopment and brain plasticity." In 2022, he was again recognized as being among the most influential scientists in his field by Thomson Reuters. Song also received the 2022 Landis Award for Outstanding Mentorship from the National Institute of Neurological Disorders and Stroke for his "dedication to superior mentorship and training in neuroscience research."

== Personal life ==
Song met his wife Guo-li Ming while they were both growing up in Wuhan, China. They have two children together, a son and daughter. Their son Max created illustrations depicting his parents research for the covers of Nature Neuroscience and The Journal of Neuroscience.
