= Weitzmann =

Weitzmann or Weitzman is a surname, a variant of Weizmann. Notable people with the surname include:

== Weitzmann ==
- Carl Borromäus Weitzmann (1767–1828), German jurist, and Swabian dialect poet
- Carl Friedrich Weitzmann (1808–1880), German music theorist
- Moisés Teitelboim, from Ukraine ∞ Sara Volosky, from Bessarabia
  - Volodia (Valentín) Teitelboim (Volosky) ∞ Raquel Weitzmann
    - Claudio Bunster, born: Claudio Bunster Teitelboim Weitzman(n), Chilean scientist
- Jacques Julien Weitzmann
- Kurt Weitzmann (1904–1993), German-American art historian, studied Byzantine and medieval art
- Marc Weitzmann

== Weitzman ==
- Daniel Maddy-Weitzman (born 1986), Israeli baseball pitcher
- David Weitzman (1898–1987), Jewish British politician
- Howard Weitzman, American trial lawyer
- Idan Weitzman (born 1985), Israeli footballer
- Martin Weitzman (1942–2019) Professor of Economics at Harvard University
- Matt Weitzman, American producer and write, one of the creators of American Dad!
- Michael Weitzman, American pediatrician
- Rick Weitzman (Richard L. Weitzman) (born 1946), American basketball player
- Stanley Howard Weitzman (1927-2017), American ichthyologist, Smithsonian Institution
- Stuart Weitzman (born 1942), American fashion designer
- Yehoshua Weitzman (born 1949, Tel-Aviv)

== Wajcman ==
- Judy Wajcman, sociologist

== See also ==
- Vaytsman
- Veitsman
- Waitsman
- Weissmann
- Weitsman
- Weizmann
