= Weissmann =

Weißmann (Weissmann, Weiszmann, Waismann) is a German and Ashkenazi Jewish surname, meaning "white man" in both German and Yiddish. Common variants in spelling are Wiseman, Weismann, Weissman, Weisman, Waismann, and Vaisman.

== Science and medicine ==
- August Weismann (1834–1914), German biologist, evolutionary theorist and proposer of the Weismann barrier
- Charles Weissmann (1931–2025), Hungarian-Swiss molecular biologist
- Drew Weissman (born 1966), American physician and immunologist
- Irving Weissman (born 1939), American scientist
- Joel Weisman (1943–2009), American doctor, one of the first to recognize AIDS
- Jonathan Weissman, American biologist
- Mariana Weissmann (born 1933), Argentinian physicist
- Samuel Isaac Weissman (1912–2007), American chemist and professor
- Sherman Weissman (born 1930), American scientist
- Weismann-Netter-Stuhl Syndrome, congenital osteopathic syndrome named after French doctors Weismann-Netter and Stuhl.

== Philosophy ==
- Friedrich Waismann (1896–1959), Austrian-Jewish mathematician, physicist, and philosopher.

== Politics and law ==
- Andrew Weissmann (born 1958), American attorney and prosecutor
- Augustus Weismann (1809–1884), New York politician
- Gerda Weissmann Klein (1924–2022), Holocaust survivor, memoirist, human rights activist and noted speaker
- Keith Weissman, senior Iran analyst of AIPAC involved in espionage scandal
- Lee v. Weisman, 1991-92 US Supreme Court case re. school prayer
- Samuel Weissman (1909-2004), New York Times employee, subpoenaed to testify in McCarthy hearings

== Business and education ==
- George Weissman (1919–2009), ex-president of Philip Morris
- Joe Weisman & Company (late 19th c.-1990), oldest department store in Texas
- Weissman School of Arts and Sciences (est. 1968), part of Baruch College, NYC

== Film and television ==
- Adam Weisman (born 1986), American actor
- Dora Weissman (1881–1974), American actress
- Greg Weisman (born 1963), American writer (scripts, novels), producer and voice actor; brother of Jon
- Jeffrey Weissman (born 1958), American actor
- Kevin Weisman (born 1970), American actor
- Malina Weissman (born 2003), American actress
- Richard (Ricky) Weissman (born 1981), VFX Artist/Special Effects
- Robin Weisman (born 1984), American child actress
- Sam Weisman (born 1947), American film director

== Sports ==
- Diana Vaisman (born 1998), Belarusian-born Israeli sprinter
- Nico Weissmann (born 1980), German footballer
- Shon Weissman (born 1996), Israeli footballer

== Literature ==
- Alan Weisman (born 1947), journalist, author and editor
- Asher Simcha Weissmann (1840–1892), Austrian writer and rabbi
- Jon Weisman (born 1967), American writer, LA Dodgers specialist; brother of Greg
- Marcus Weissmann-Chajes (1831–1914), Galician Jewish writer

== Graphics ==
- Greg Weisman: see above
- Jordan Weisman (born 1960), American game designer
- Steven Weissman (born 1960), American cartoonist

== Art ==
- Andrew Weissmann, NYC Mid-century modern art designer and dealer
- Franz Weissmann (1911–2005), Austrian-born Brazilian sculptor
- Frederick R. Weisman Museum of Art, California (est. 1992)
- Janice Urnstein Weissman (born 1944), American painter
- Weisman Art Museum, Minneapolis (est. 1934), aka Frederick Weisman Museum of Art

== Music ==
- Ben Weisman (1921–2007), American composer and pianist
- Joel Weisman (born 1967), American musician and writer
- Theodor Weissman (1891–1966), Finnish singer and actor
- Vladimir Weisman (1931–1995), American Violinist

== Military ==
- Eugene Weismann (1896-1973), French First World War flying ace
- Reuven Weisman (1967-2023), casualty of October 7 attacks

== Computer science ==
- Eliza Weisman, transgender American programmer (low-level programming, infrastructure, operating systems, asynchronous runtimes)

== Fictional characters ==
- Georg Weissmann, main antagonist of the video game The Legend of Heroes: Trails in the Sky SC
- Midge Weissman, protagonist in The Marvelous Mrs. Maisel
- Adolf K. Weismann, protagonist of K (TV Series)
- Weissman, a major antagonist within Thomas Pynchon's novel Gravity's Rainbow

== See also ==
- Wiseman (surname)
- Weizmann
- Weitzman
