= Katherine Van Hooser =

Katherine P. Van Hooser (sometimes Vanhooser) served as a NASA engineer for over 35 years, with her ultimate position as Acting Deputy Director. Her work was instrumental in advancing the systems liquid engines element, a critical component of the Artemis program.

== Biography ==
Van Hooser was raised in Madisonville Kentucky. The inaugural flight of Space Shuttle Columbia in April 1981 ignited her excitement about the space program.

Van Hooser earned a BS in aerospace engineering from the University of Tennessee-Knoxville in 1991. Before graduating, she started work at Marshall Space Flight Center in Huntsville Alabama to work on turbomachinery where she continued to work after graduation. She participated in the redesign of the high-pressure turbopumps for the space shuttle. During this time she developed software to model turbomachinery fluid flow.

Due to her experience in turbomachinery, Van Hooser was promoted to team and branch leadership roles in 2003–2004. In 2005, she became the space shuttle main engine deputy chief engineer and in 2008, was promoted to chief engineer. She oversaw the team who supported the last 21 space shuttle flights. During this time, Van Hooser led the engineering group that investigated and resolved space shuttle seals for the main engine turbopump.

Van Hooser was promoted to Chief Engineer for Space Launch System Liquid Engines Element in 2011. Later, in 2012 she worked on a temporary assignment as SLS acting deputy chief engineer for five months, then 15 months as acting associate director of engineering where she led 2,600 civil service and support contractors and worked in strategic planning. In 2016, Van Hooser was Chief Engineer of Marshall Space Flight Center providing technical leadership over NASA space programs.

Van Hooser has been NASA's Deputy Chief Engineer since 2023. In this role, she provided technical leadership and oversight for many NASA programs.

Van Hooser will retire as director November 1, 2026, and will be succeeded by astronaut Christina Koch as NASA's acting deputy chief engineer.

== Awards ==
2001 NASA Software of the Year Award

2008 NASA Exceptional Engineering Achievement Medal

2010 Astronaut corps Silver Snoopy award for outstanding achievements

2011 NASA Distinguished Service Medal

2018 inducted into the University of Tennessee Mechanical, Aerospace, and Biomedical Engineering Hall of Fame

Throughout her career, Van Hooser has been involved in session planning for American Institute of Aeronautics and Astronautics and Joint Army-Navy-NASA-Air Force conferences.

== See also ==
- Podcast Celebrating NASA's Engineers: Katherine Van Hooser
