= John Wiseman (disambiguation) =

John Wiseman is a British author.

John Wiseman may also refer to:

- Johnny Wiseman (1916–2005), British soldier
- John Wiseman (MP) (by 1515–1558), for East Grinstead and Maldon
- Sir John Wiseman, see Wiseman baronets

== See also ==
- Jack Wiseman (?–2009), chairman of Birmingham City Football Club
- Jack Wiseman (economist) (1919–1991), British economist
