= Mary Wiseman =

Mary Wiseman may refer to:

- Mary Wiseman (judge) (born 1961), American judge
- Mary Wiseman (actress) (born 1985), American actress
