= Scott Wiseman (disambiguation) =

Scott Wiseman may refer to:

- Scotty Wiseman (1909-1981), musician, see Lulu Belle and Scotty
- Scott Wiseman (born 1985), Gibraltarian footballer
