= Christina Koch =

American astronaut (born 1979)

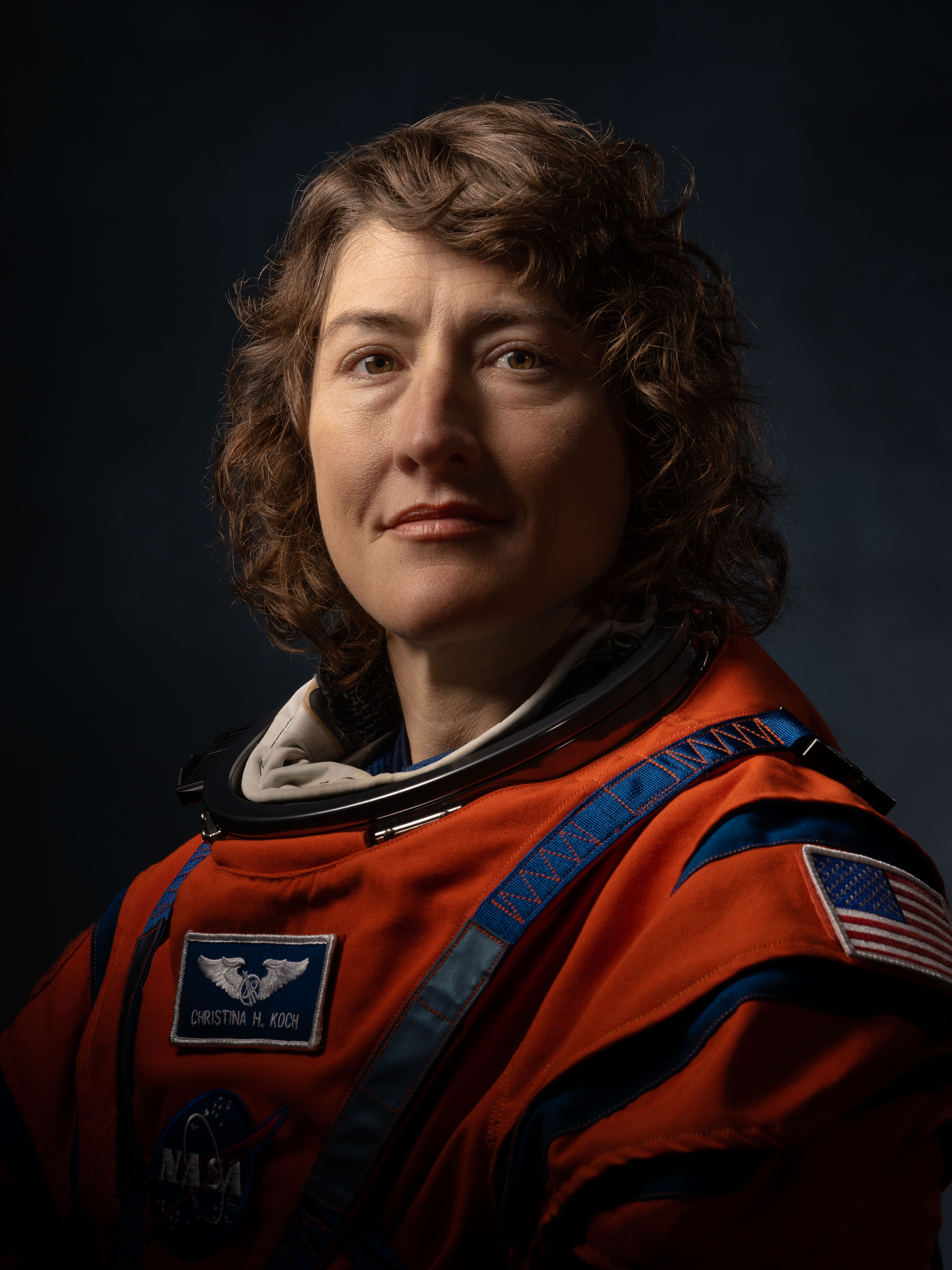
- Official portrait, 2023
- Born: Christina Hammock; January 29, 1979 (age 47); Grand Rapids, Michigan, U.S.
- Education: North Carolina State University (BS, MS)
- Spouse: Robert Koch
- Space career

NASA astronaut
- Time in space: 337 days, 15 hours, 30 minutes
- Selection: NASA Group 21 (2013)
- Total EVAs: 6
- Total EVA time: 42 hours, 15 minutes
- Missions: Soyuz MS-12/MS-13 (Expedition 59/60/61); Artemis II
- Mission insignia
- Retired: November 1, 2026

Christina Hammock Koch (/kʊk/ KUUK; née Hammock; born January 29, 1979) is an American engineer and NASA astronaut. On her mission to the International Space Station in 2019–2020 she was part of the first all‑female spacewalk and set the record for the longest spaceflight by a woman. On the Artemis II lunar flyby mission in April 2026, which set the record for human distance from Earth, Koch became the only woman to travel beyond low Earth orbit and to travel around the Moon.

Before joining the NASA Astronaut Corps, Koch worked at the Goddard Space Flight Center and served as station chief for the National Oceanic and Atmospheric Administration's American Samoa Observatory.

== Early life and education ==
Christina Hammock was born on January 29, 1979, in Grand Rapids, Michigan, and is the oldest of four siblings. Her parents, Barbara Johnsen (née Homrich) of Frederick, Maryland, and Ronald Hammock of Jacksonville, North Carolina, met while working at a hospital in Kalamazoo, Michigan, where her mother was a medical technician and her father was a resident doctor. Her family moved to Dearborn, Michigan when she was an infant and later moved to Jacksonville, North Carolina in 1982 where she spent the remainder of her childhood.

As a child, Hammock spent her summers with her family at her maternal grandfather's farm in Sparta, Michigan, tending fields with her younger family members. According to her mother, her grandparents would tell Hammock "You've got to work hard to make it happen because if you don't, it won't." Both Hammock and her mother attribute her work ethic to her days working on the farm. From an early age, she aspired to become an astronaut. She placed clipped images of space and Antarctica from National Geographic magazines on her bedroom wall, later stating "All of these places that were on the frontiers, places to be explored, just caught my interest from the time I was really young." She attended at least five Space Camps in Huntsville, Alabama.

She briefly attended White Oak High School and graduated from the North Carolina School of Science and Mathematics in Durham in 1997. During the 1999/2000 academic year, Hammock participated in a student exchange program at the University of Ghana, Legon, where she studied astrophysics. She then enrolled at North Carolina State University (NCSU) in Raleigh, earning Bachelor of Science degrees in electrical engineering and physics in 2001, followed by a Master of Science degree in electrical engineering in 2002. In 2001, she completed the NASA Academy program at the Goddard Space Flight Center. Outside of her studies she provided photographs to the Technician and did volunteer work for Habitat for Humanity and Engineers Without Borders.

== Research and training ==
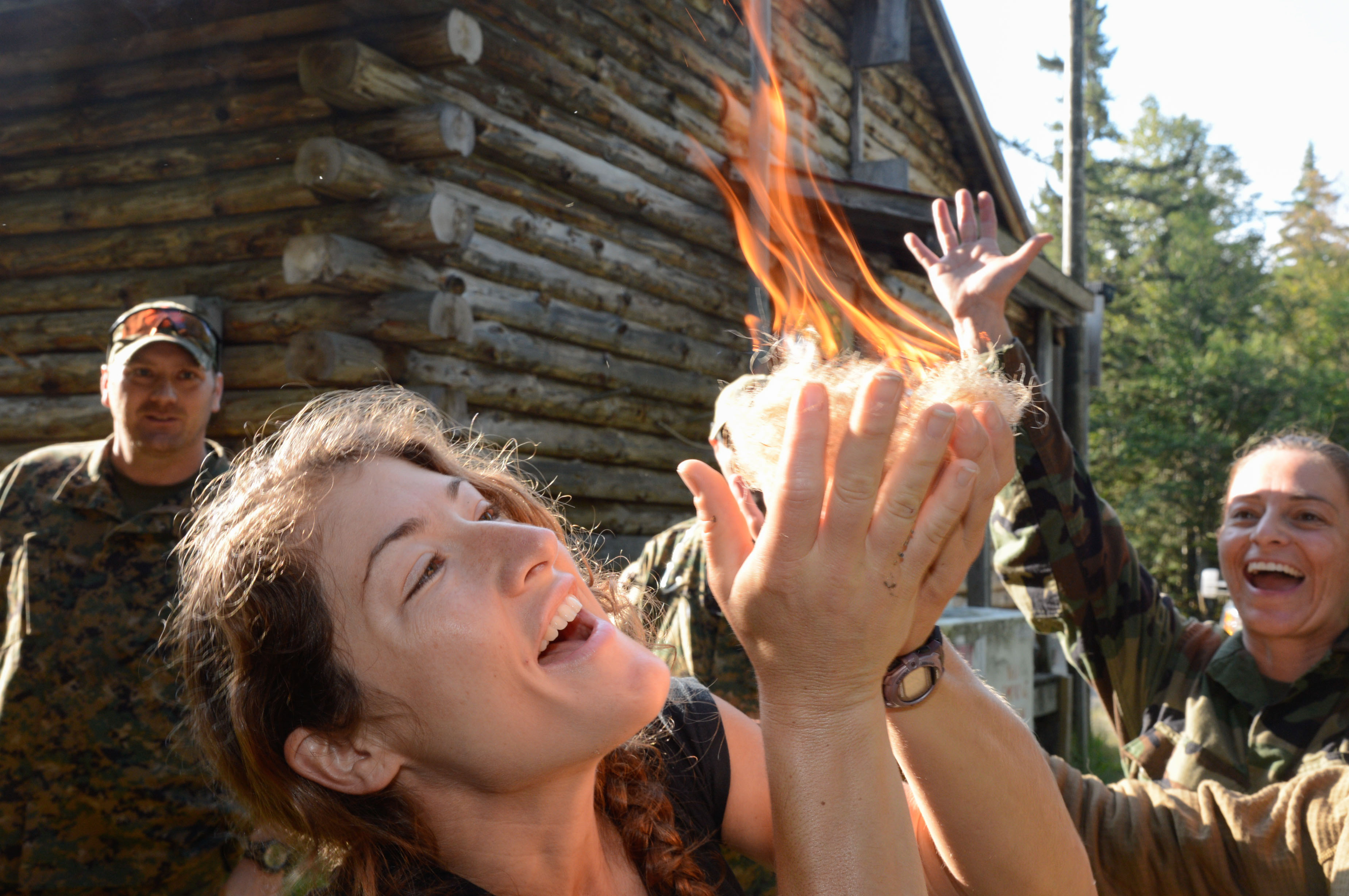
Koch signals her success in starting a fire during wilderness survival training in 2013.

Koch graduated from the NASA Academy program at GSFC in 2001. She worked as an electrical engineer in the Laboratory for High Energy Astrophysics at GSFC from 2002 to 2004. Koch has worked in space‑science instrument development and remote scientific field engineering. As an electrical engineer at NASA's Goddard Space Flight Center (GSFC) Laboratory for High Energy Astrophysics, she contributed to scientific instruments for several NASA missions studying astrophysics and cosmology. During this period, she also served as adjunct faculty at Montgomery College in Maryland, where she led a physics laboratory course.

From 2004 to 2007, Koch worked as a research associate in the United States Antarctic Program, spending three and a half years in the Arctic and Antarctic regions. She completed a winter-over season at the Amundsen–Scott South Pole Station, where temperatures reached −111 °F (−79 °C), and an additional season at Palmer Station. While in Antarctica, she served on firefighting teams and ocean/glacier search‑and‑rescue teams. Koch has described her time at the South Pole as mentally and physically challenging, noting, "[This] means going months without seeing the sun, with the same crew, and without shipments of mail or fresh food. The isolation, absence of family and friends, and lack of new sensory inputs are all conditions that you must find a strategy to thrive within."

From 2007 to 2009, Koch worked as an electrical engineer in the Space Department of the Johns Hopkins University Applied Physics Laboratory, focusing on space-science instrument development. She contributed to instruments studying radiation particles for NASA missions, including Juno and Van Allen Probes. The following year, she completed tours at Palmer Station in Antarctica and multiple winter seasons at Summit Station in Greenland. In 2012, she joined the National Oceanic and Atmospheric Administration (NOAA), first as a field engineer at the Global Monitoring Division Baseline Observatory in Barrow, Alaska (now Utqiaġvik), and later as station chief of the American Samoa Observatory.

== Astronaut career ==
In June 2013, Koch was selected by NASA as part of Astronaut Group 21, becoming one of four NASA astronauts born in the Grand Rapids metropolitan area, alongside Roger B. Chaffee, Jack R. Lousma and David Leestma. She completed her training in July 2015, qualifying her for future missions. Her astronaut candidate training included scientific and technical briefings, intensive instruction in International Space Station systems, spacewalks, robotics, physiological training, T-38 flight training, and water and wilderness survival training.

=== Expeditions 59/60/61 ===
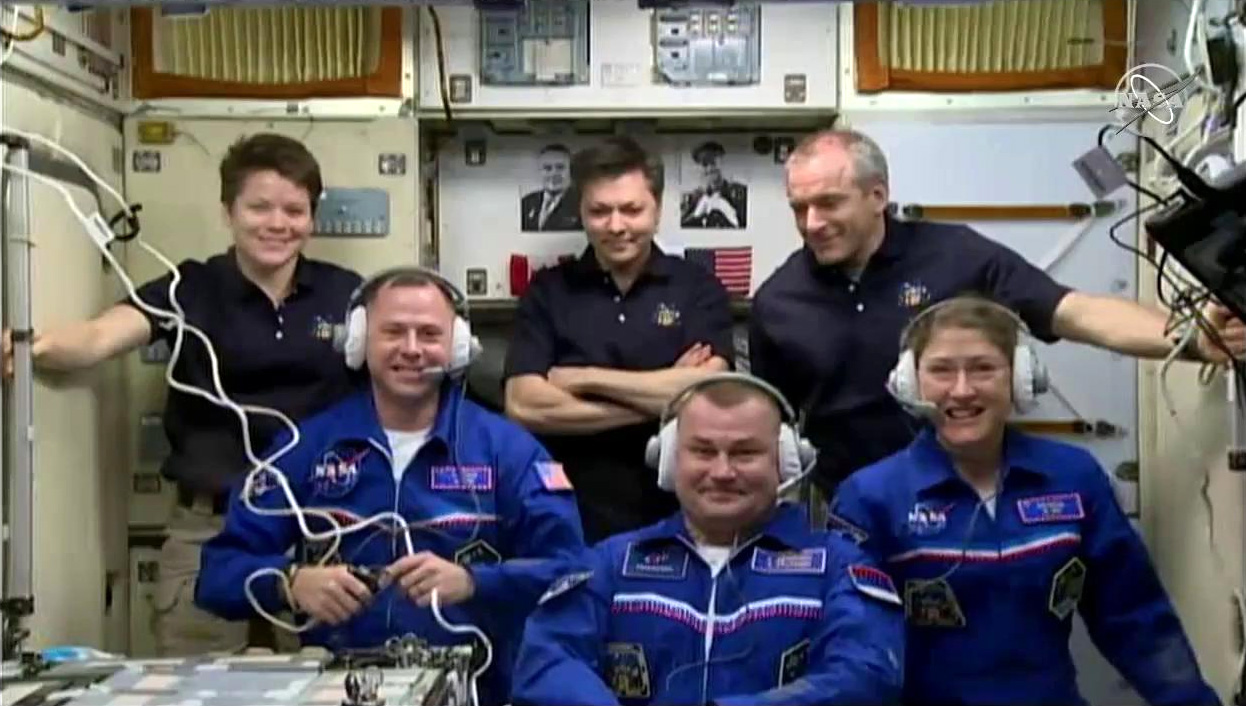
Expedition 59 crew members Anne McClain, Oleg Kononenko, and David Saint-Jacques welcome their new crew members, Nick Hague, Alexey Ovchinin, and Koch (bottom right) who arrived at the International Space Station on March 14, 2019.

On March 14, 2019, Koch launched to the International Space Station aboard Soyuz MS-12 with Aleksey Ovchinin and Nick Hague to join the Expedition 59/60/61 crew.

Koch was scheduled to perform her first extravehicular activity (EVA) on March 29, in what would have been the first all‑female spacewalk alongside Anne McClain. However, spacesuit sizing constraints led to McClain being replaced by Hague. Koch later performed the first all‑female spacewalk with Jessica Meir on October 18, as part of a series of upgrades to the ISS power systems and physics observatories. Koch and Meir conducted two additional all‑female spacewalks in January 2020.

On April 17, 2019, due to reassignment schedules associated with the Commercial Crew Development program, Koch's mission was extended to February 2020. She returned to Earth on February 6 after 328 days in space – the longest single continuous spaceflight by a woman, surpassing Peggy Whitson's 289-day record. The extension marked the first time NASA had lengthened a first‑time astronaut's mission in this way. Koch's extended stay is being used to study the physical, biological, and psychological effects of long‑duration spaceflight on women. During the mission, she made the first edit to Wikipedia from space to add a description of her own spacewalk.

=== Artemis II ===
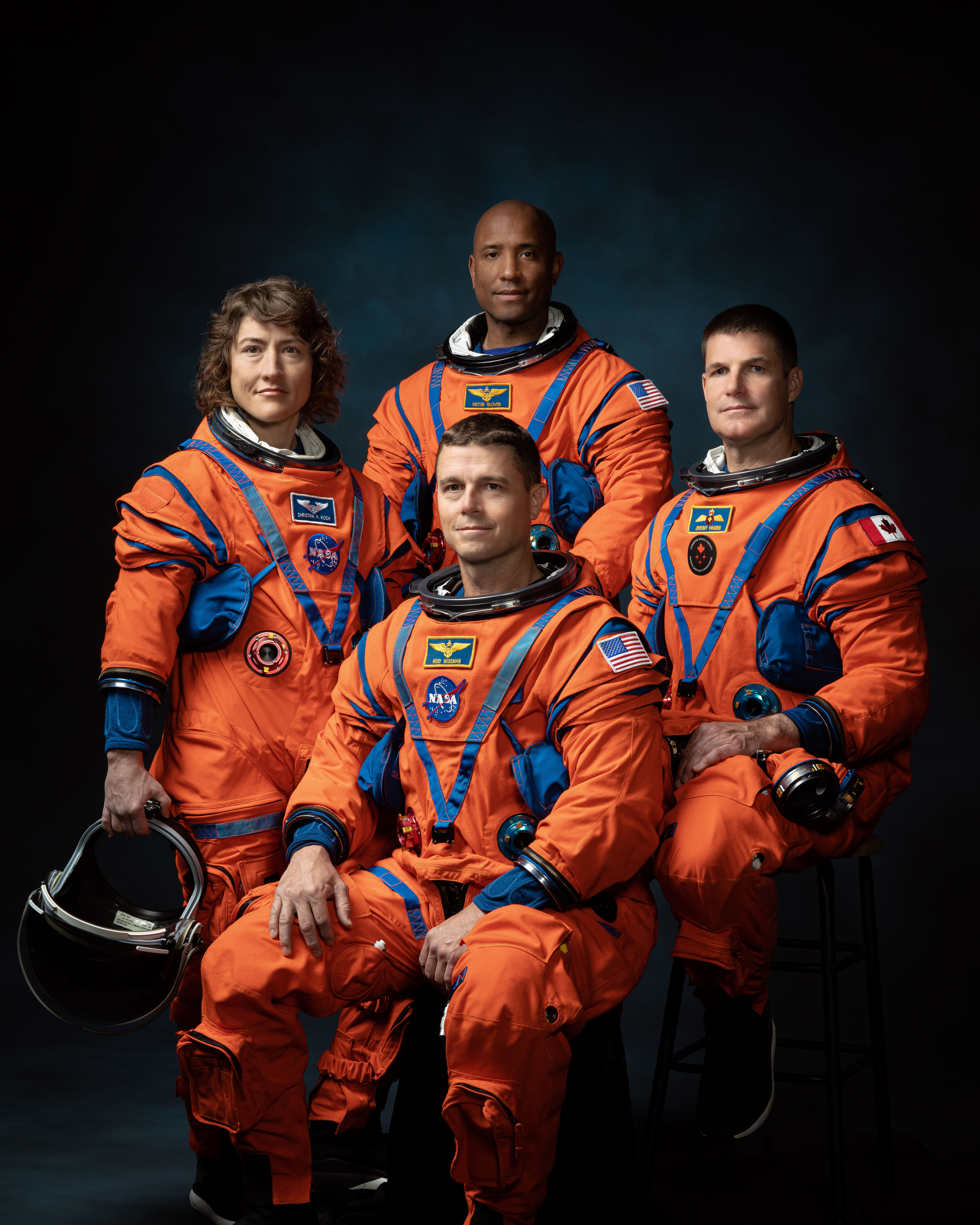
Official crew portrait for Artemis II, from left: NASA Astronauts Christina Koch, Victor Glover, Reid Wiseman, and Canadian Space Agency astronaut Jeremy Hansen

Koch took the photograph Earthset during the lunar flyby of Artemis II

Koch was selected as a member of NASA's Artemis program. On April 3, 2023, she was announced as a mission specialist in the Artemis II crew, joined by NASA astronauts Reid Wiseman and Victor Glover, and Canadian Space Agency astronaut Jeremy Hansen. Artemis II launched on April 1, 2026, and flew by the Moon on April 6, 2026, traveling 6,400 miles (10,300 km) beyond the Moon's far side before returning to Earth on April 11, 2026. Koch is the only woman to leave low Earth orbit and to travel to the vicinity of the Moon. During the flyby, Koch photographed Earthset, which shows the Earth appearing to set behind the lunar surface.

On November 1, 2026, Koch relinquished her active astronaut status and replaced Katherine Van Hooser as NASA's acting deputy chief engineer.

== Personal life ==
Koch resides in Galveston, Texas with her husband, Bob, who is a geospatial engineer. The couple met at a Halloween party in American Samoa, where Koch was working at a climate research station and her husband was working as a government contractor for the Samoan Department of Commerce.

Her hobbies include surfing, rock and ice climbing, programming, community service, triathlon, yoga, backpacking, woodworking, photography, and travel. Koch is also a fan of Philadelphia sports teams and has posted pictures of herself watching the Phillies and Eagles on the ISS.

== Awards and honors ==
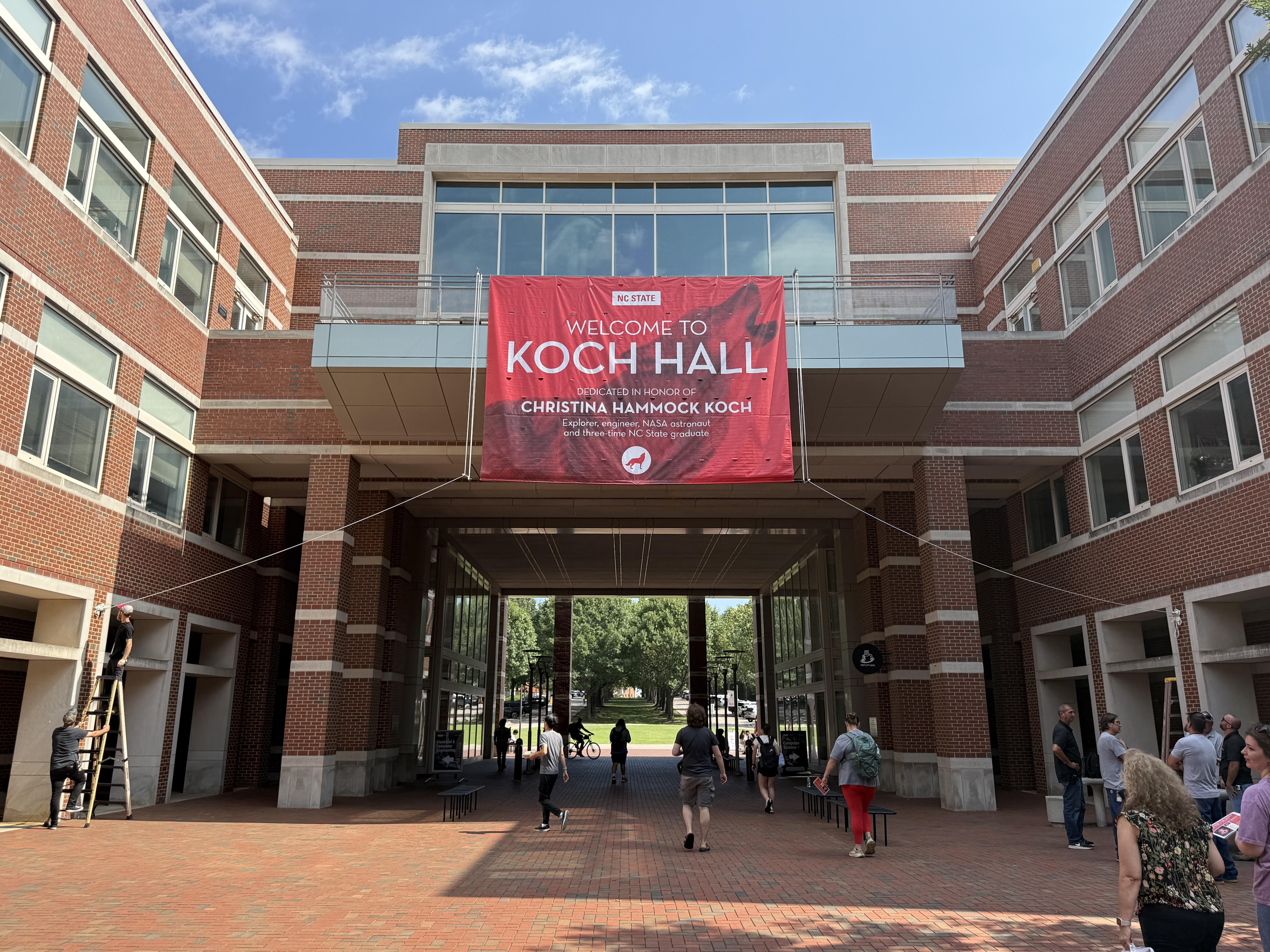
North Carolina State University College of Engineering's learning space "Engineering Building II" was renamed to "Koch Hall" on August 24, 2026

Koch has received numerous awards during her career at NASA and the Johns Hopkins University Applied Physics Laboratory, including the NASA Group Achievement Award for the Juno Mission Jupiter Energetic Particle Detector Instrument (2012); Johns Hopkins University Applied Physics Laboratory Invention of the Year nominee (2009); United States Congress Antarctic Service Medal with Winter-Over distinction, (2005); NASA Group Achievement Award for the Suzaku Mission X-ray Spectrometer Instrument (2005); and Astronaut Scholar, Astronaut Scholarship Foundation (2000–2001).

In December 2020, Koch was awarded an honorary Doctor of Sciences degree from her alma mater NCSU.

Koch was included in Time's list of the 100 Most Influential People of 2020.

In 2026, she was awarded the Princess of Asturias Awards in the category of "Concord".

On August 24, 2026, NCSU organized an event showcasing Koch titled "Around the Moon and Pack Again". The event featured guest speakers including NCSU chancellor Kevin Howell, North Carolina representative Donny Lambeth, and North Carolina governor Josh Stein. During the event, Howell formally renamed "Engineering Building II", located on the North Carolina State University College of Engineering campus, to "Koch Hall" in her honor. Also dedicated was a temporary Howling Cow Ice Cream flavor titled "Howl at the Moon", which was berry-flavored.

On August 28, 2026, Koch alongside the Artemis II crew received the Congressional Space Medal of Honor for their successful mission around the Moon.
