= Jane Wiseman (disambiguation) =

Jane Wiseman (1673–1717) was a British actor, poet, and playwright.

Jane Wiseman may also refer to:

- Jane Wiseman (judge), judge in Oklahoma from 1973
- Jane Wiseman (recusant) (died 1610), Catholic hero/priest harbourer
