= Shari Wiseman =

American neuroscientist

Shari Wiseman is an American neuroscientist and the editor in chief of Nature Neuroscience.

== Education ==
Wiseman earned her PhD from Yale University and undertook postdoctoral research at the Beth Israel-Deaconess Medical Center where she worked on animal models of autism spectrum disorders. After that, she undertook postdoctoral training at Tufts University where she focused on the regulation of GABAB receptors by excitotoxic stimuli.

== Career ==
She has worked at Nature Neuroscience since 2017, as an associate editor, becoming the editor in chief in 2021.

=== Selected publications ===
- Senescence in Down syndrome NPCs, Nature Neuroscience, 2022 Feb;25(2):131. doi: 10.1038/s41593-022-01016-6. PMID 35132233

== Personal life ==
Wiseman lives in New York. She is a mother of two children.
