= Claire Wiseman =

American psychologist

- Born: 1965 (age 60–61); Boston, Massachusetts U.S.
- Education: Cornell University; American University
- Known for: Studies of eating disorders and body image
- Awards: Thelma Hunt Award (1993); CT Concerned Citizens (2016)
- Scientific career
- Fields: Psychology, eating disorder psychology
- Workplaces: Yale University; Trinity College; Weill Cornell Medicine; NewYork–Presbyterian Hospital
- Doctoral advisor: James Gray

Claire V. Wiseman (born 1965) is an assistant clinical professor of psychology at the Yale School of Medicine and a practicing clinical Psychologist and researcher who specializes in eating disorders and adolescent body image.

== Academic career ==
Wiseman earned her BA in psychology and economics from Cornell University in 1987, and her MA in social psychology from American University in 1991. She completed her PhD in clinical psychology three years later at American University in 1994. She completed her post-doctoral fellowship in eating disorders at Yale University.

Her research, aimed at determining causes and treatments of eating disorders, has been highly influential. Wiseman is an expert in anorexia nervosa and bulimia nervosa.
