= Victor Glover =

American astronaut (born 1976)

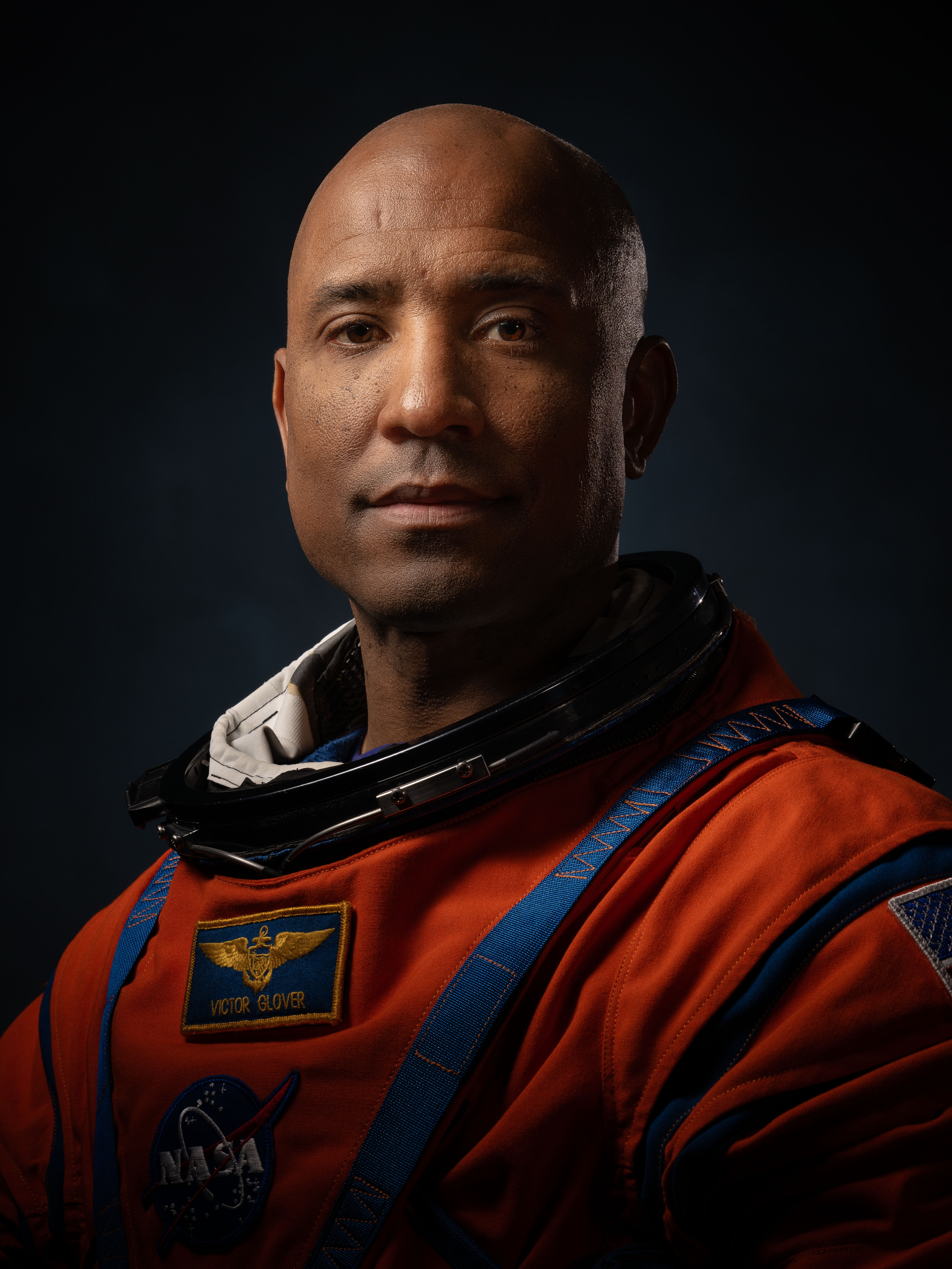
- Glover in 2023
- Born: Victor Jerome Glover Jr. April 30, 1976 (age 50); Pomona, California, U.S.
- Education: California Polytechnic State University, San Luis Obispo (BS); Air University (MS, MMAS); Naval Postgraduate School (MS)
- Spouse: Dionna Odom
- Children: 4
- Awards: NASA Distinguished Service Medal (2021)
- Space career

NASA astronaut (emeritus)
- Rank: Captain, United States Navy
- Time in space: 176 days, 8 hours, 1 minute
- Selection: NASA Group 21 (2013)
- Total EVAs: 4
- Total EVA time: 26 hours, 7 minutes
- Missions: SpaceX Crew-1 (Expedition 64/65); Artemis II
- Retired: September 9, 2026 (emeritus status)

Victor Jerome Glover Jr. (born April 30, 1976) is a United States Navy captain, test pilot, and NASA astronaut (emeritus). A former F/A‑18 pilot and graduate of the United States Air Force Test Pilot School, in 2020, he piloted the first operational flight of SpaceX's Crew Dragon to the International Space Station. Glover served as a flight engineer on Expedition 64 and became the first Black American astronaut to live aboard the ISS. In April 2026, Glover piloted the Artemis II lunar flyby mission, during which he became the only person of color to fly beyond low Earth orbit and to travel to the vicinity of the Moon. Glover and his crew travelled farther from Earth than any other humans.

== Early life and education ==
Victor Jerome Glover Jr. was born on April 30, 1976, in Pomona, California. His mother, Cynthia Maxwell, a bookkeeper, and his father, Victor Jerome Glover, a retired police officer, are both African Americans. His grandfather served in the Air Force during the Korean War period and faced obstacles that prevented him from pursuing a career in aviation.

Glover's interest in science and engineering was encouraged by his father. He graduated from Ontario High School in 1994, where he was a quarterback and running back for the Jaguars football team and received the school's 1994 Athlete of the Year Award. He also competed in pole vault.

Glover attended California Polytechnic State University in San Luis Obispo and earned a Bachelor of Science degree in general engineering in 1999. He was the first in his family to graduate from college. While at Cal Poly, he became a member of the Phi Beta Sigma fraternity, joined the Mustangs wrestling team after placing sixth at the CIF State Championship Meet, and competed as a defensive back on the 1996 Cal Poly football team, wearing number 23.

From 2007 to 2010, Glover earned three master's degrees from three different institutions. He received a Master of Science in flight test engineering from the Air University of the United States Air Force at Edwards Air Force Base, California; a Master of Science in Systems Engineering from the Naval Postgraduate School in Monterey, California; and a Master of Military Operational Art and Science from Air University in Montgomery, Alabama.

He also holds a certificate in space systems from the Naval Postgraduate School and a certificate in legislative studies from Georgetown University.

== Military career ==
Glover was commissioned as an ensign in the United States Navy in 1999. He attended primary flight training at Naval Air Station Pensacola, Florida, and earned his naval aviator wings in 2001. He later trained on the F/A-18C Hornet with VMFAT-101 at Marine Corps Air Station Miramar in San Diego, California. In 2003, he was assigned to VFA-34, based at Naval Air Station Oceana, Virginia. With VFA-34, he embarked on the final deployment of USS John F. Kennedy in support of Operation Iraqi Freedom.

In June 2006, Glover was selected to attend the United States Air Force Test Pilot School. After graduating in June 2007, he was designated a test pilot and began his developmental test tour with VX-31 at Naval Air Weapons Station China Lake, California. In 2011, he was assigned to VFA-195 for his department head tour. Stationed at Naval Air Facility Atsugi, Japan, VFA-195 embarked on USS George Washington in support of maritime operations in the Western Pacific Ocean.

At the time of his selection as an astronaut candidate in 2013, Glover was serving on the personal staff of Senator John McCain as a legislative fellow in Washington, D.C.

During his career, Glover has accumulated 3,000 flight hours in more than 40 aircraft and has completed over 400 carrier arrested landings and 24 combat missions. His callsign is "Ike", given to him by one of his first commanding officers, meaning "I know everything".

== NASA career ==
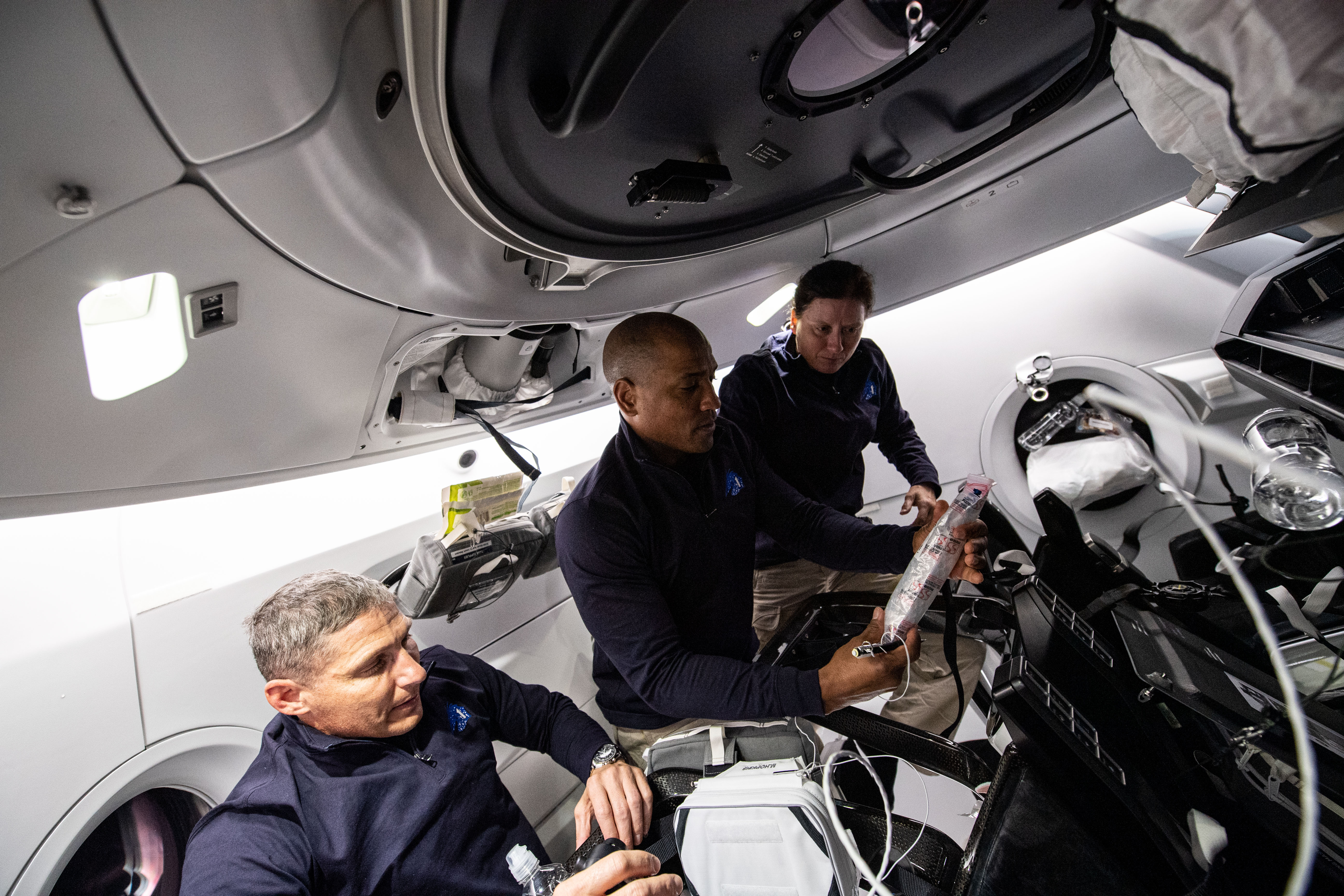
Glover and his crewmates inside the SpaceX Crew-1 capsule during its approach to the ISS in 2020

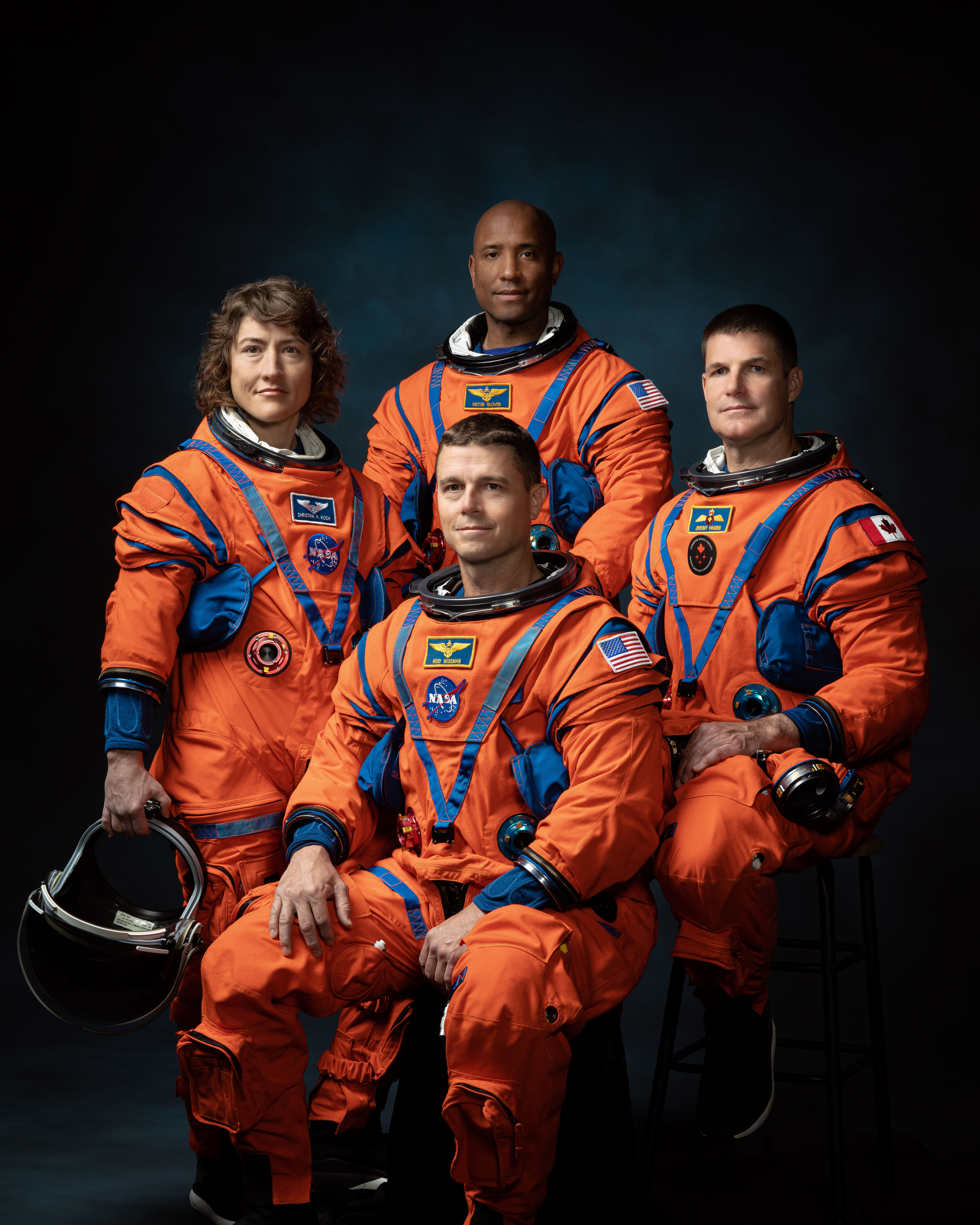
Official crew portrait for Artemis II, clockwise from left: Christina Koch, Glover, Jeremy Hansen, and Reid Wiseman

Glover was introduced as a member of NASA's Astronaut Group 21 in June 2013 and completed his training in 2015.

=== Expedition 64/65 ===
In August 2018, Glover was introduced as one of NASA's Commercial Crew astronauts and was assigned to the first operational flight—and the second crewed flight overall—of SpaceX's Crew Dragon. As part of that mission, he served as a station systems flight engineer on Expeditions 64 and 65 for more than six months. Glover is the first Black American ISS Expedition crewmember to live aboard the International Space Station, rather than visit briefly during Space Shuttle assembly missions. According to The New York Times:

Mr. Glover's achievement is notable for NASA, which has worked to spotlight the "hidden figures" in its history, but has so far sent only 14 Black Americans to space out of a total of more than 300 NASA astronauts. He will not be the first Black astronaut aboard the station. But those who preceded him from NASA were members of Space Shuttle crews during the station's construction and only made brief stays on the outpost.

SpaceX Crew Dragon capsule Resilience launched on November 15, 2020, carrying Glover along with NASA astronauts Michael S. Hopkins and Shannon Walker and JAXA astronaut Soichi Noguchi. They arrived at the International Space Station on November 17. During his stay, Glover was selected as one of 18 astronauts for NASA's Artemis program on December 9, 2020.

Glover conducted his first spacewalk on January 27, 2021, working with Hopkins for more than six hours to upgrade the Columbus module. On his second spacewalk, also with Hopkins, he replaced a broken external camera. During his third spacewalk, he and Kate Rubins began work to upgrade the station's power system in preparation for new solar arrays.

On February 24, 2021, NASA released a video call between Vice President Kamala Harris and Glover aboard the station. According to NASA, "the conversation ranged from the legacy of human spaceflight to observing Earth from the vantage of the space station, Glover's history-making stay aboard the orbiting laboratory, and preparing for missions from the Moon to Mars".

=== Artemis II ===
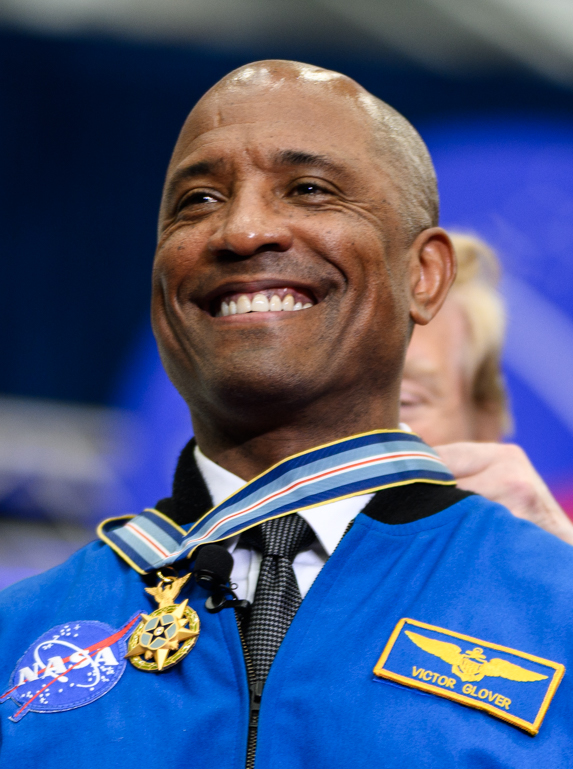
Victor Glover at Congressional Medal of Honor ceremony at the NASA Johnson Space Center, August 28, 2026

On April 3, 2023, Glover was announced as the pilot of the Artemis II mission, which launched at 22:35 UTC on April 1, 2026, and flew around the Moon on April 6, 2026. He was joined by NASA astronauts Reid Wiseman and Christina Koch, and Canadian Space Agency astronaut Jeremy Hansen. Glover is the first African American to leave low Earth orbit and to travel around the Moon, and he and his crew reached the furthest human distance from Earth.

In September 2026, NASA announced that Glover had transitioned to emeritus status, making him no longer eligible for flight, but allowing him to donate his time to train and mentor other NASA employees, while offering the flexibility to pursue other opportunities.

== Personal life ==
Glover is married to Dionna Glover, and they have four daughters.

Glover is a Christian and attends a Churches of Christ congregation in Friendswood, Texas, with his wife. He has cited his faith as a major source of inspiration throughout his career and carried several religious items, including a Bible and communion cups, to the International Space Station.

Glover says he listens to "Whitey on the Moon", a 1970 poem by Gil Scott-Heron, twice a week on his commute to work.

== See also ==
- List of African-American astronauts

== Bibliography ==
- Glover, Victor J. (2012). Talking Back: Weapons, Warfare, and Feedback. BiblioScholar Dissertations. ISBN 978-1286863367.
