= Weitsman =

Weitsman is a surname, a variant of Weizmann. Notable people with the surname include:

- Adam Weitsman, American entrepreneur and philanthropist
- Mel Weitsman (born 1929), American Zen Buddhist
- Patricia A. Weitsman (1964–2014), American political scientist

== See also ==
- Weissmann
