= Carroll (crater) =

Crater on the Moon

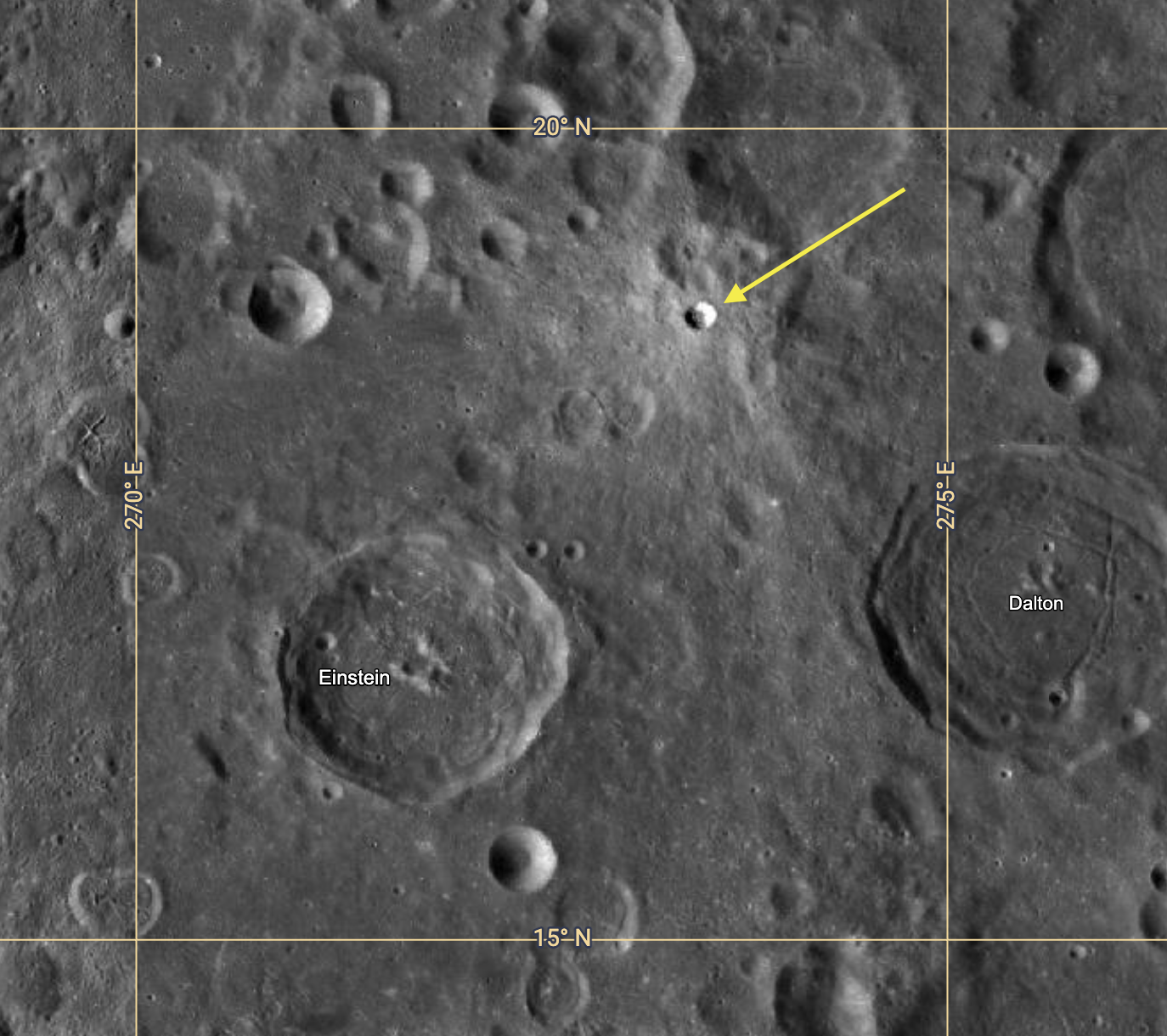
- Location of Carroll crater showing a bright crater northwest of Glushko and at the same latitude as Ohm.
- Coordinates: 18.842°N 86.53°W
- Diameter: 5.6 km (3.5 mi)
- Depth: 1.1 km (0.68 mi)
- Eponym: Carroll Taylor Wiseman

Carroll is a lunar impact crater. It was unofficially named on April 6, 2026, by the crew of the Artemis II mission during their flyby of the Moon, after Commander Reid Wiseman's wife Carroll Taylor-Wiseman, who died in 2020.

== Naming ==
Jeremy Hansen requests the naming of the crater on board Artemis II

The crater was designated to honor Carroll Taylor-Wiseman, the deceased wife of Artemis II commander Reid Wiseman. Wiseman was married to Carroll until her death from cancer in 2020. It was named just moments after the crew set the record for the farthest distance from Earth ever traveled by humans. The crater name proposal is set to be submitted to the International Astronomical Union.

== Location ==
The crater is near the boundary between the Moon's near and far sides, allowing it to be seen from Earth at times.

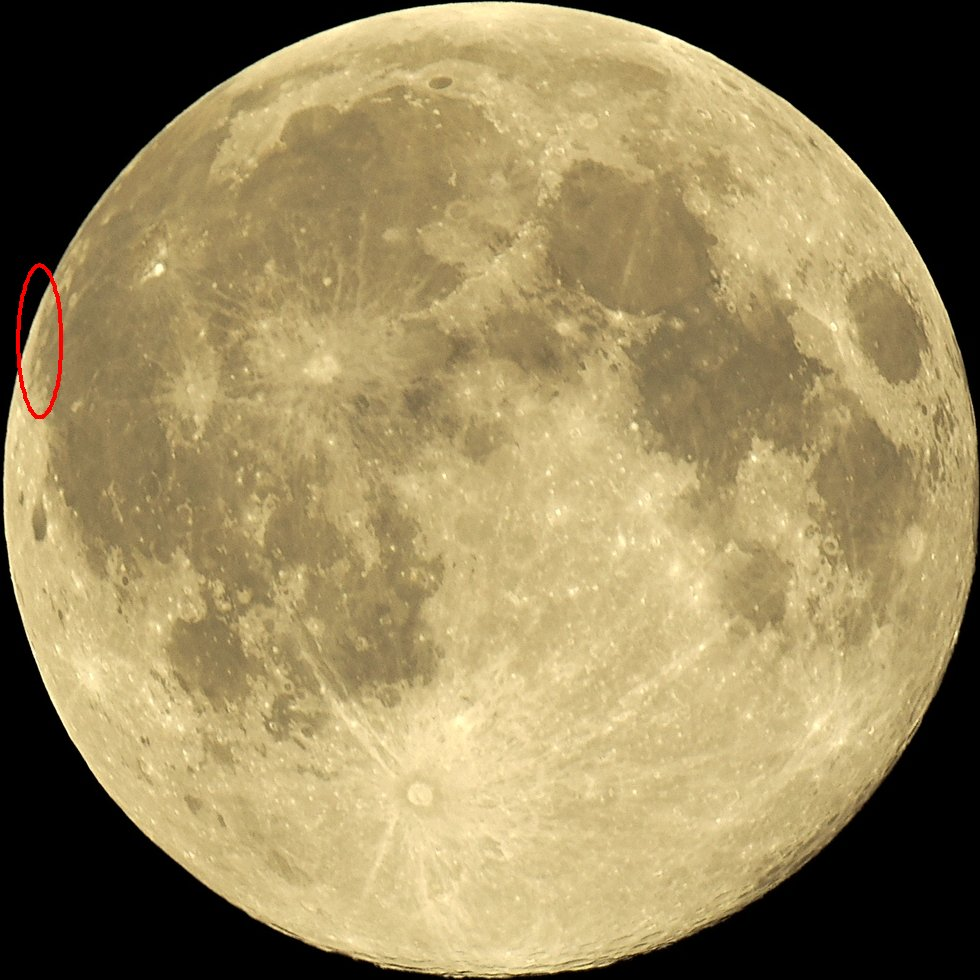
The full moon; the red oval at the left-center marks the region in which Carroll is located.

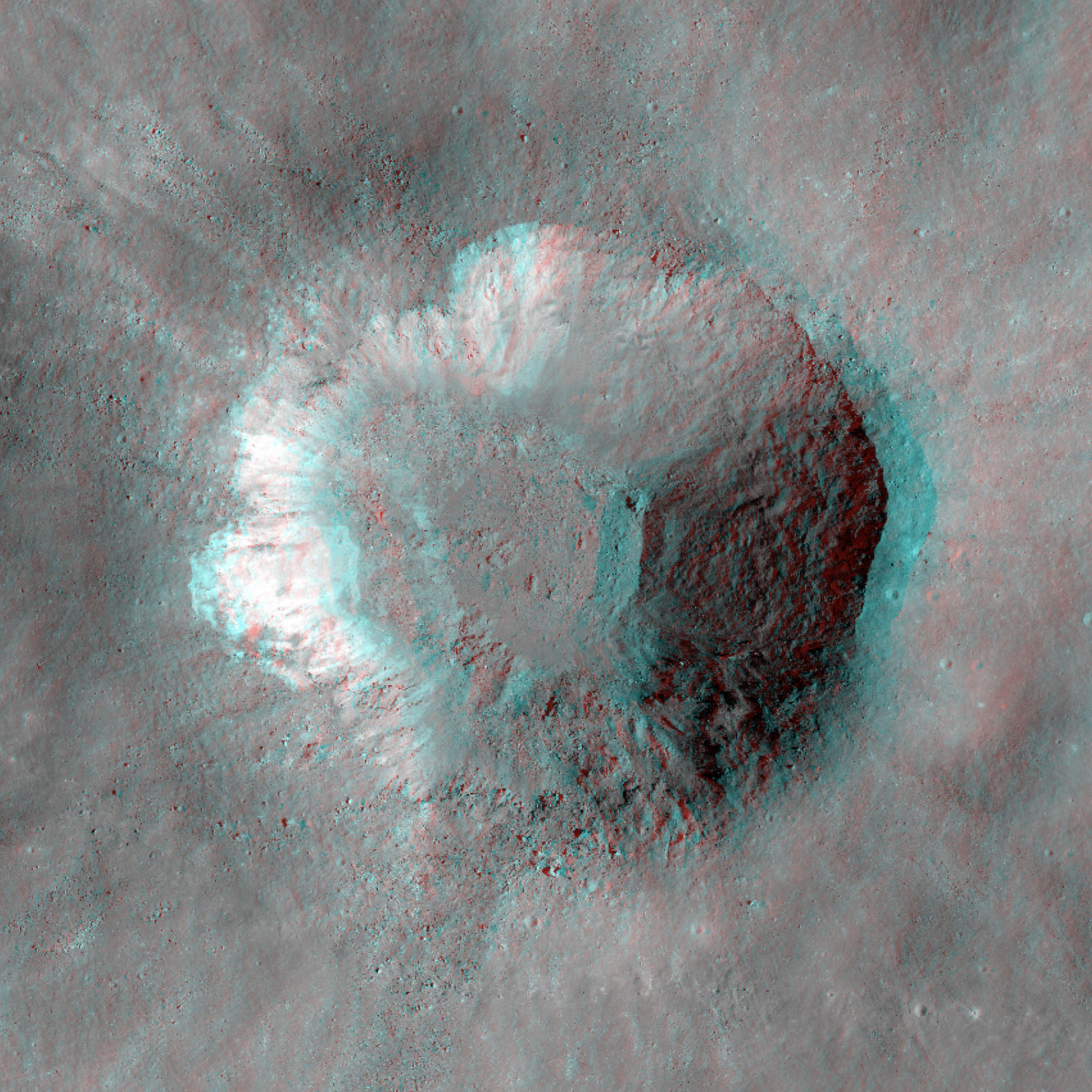
Anaglyph of Carroll crater taken by the LROC Narrow Angle Camera.

== See also ==
- Integrity (crater), the other crater unofficially named by the Artemis II crew.
