= Reid Wiseman =

American astronaut (born 1975)

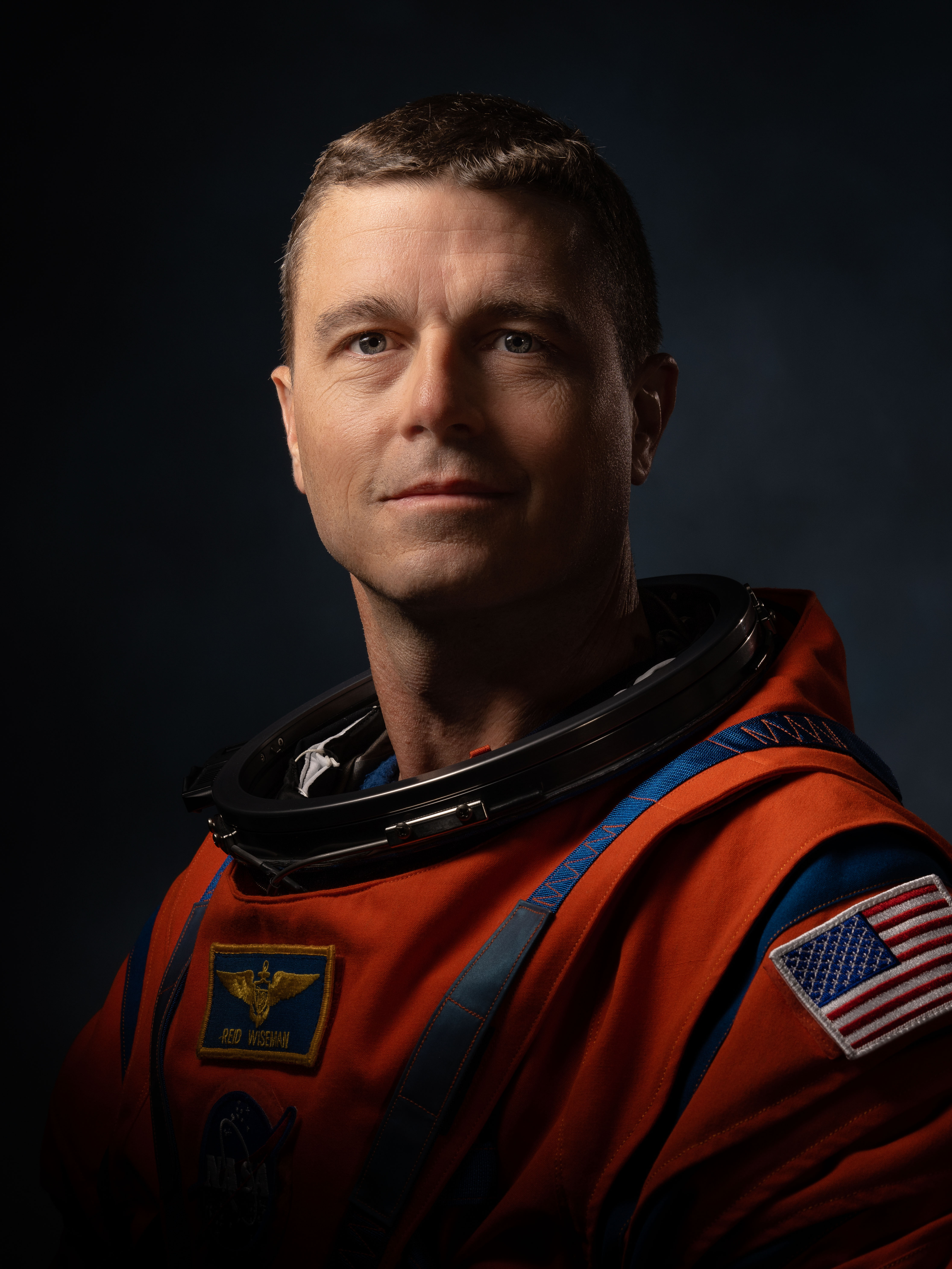
- Wiseman in 2023
- Born: Gregory Reid Wiseman; November 11, 1975 (age 51); Baltimore, Maryland, U.S.
- Education: Rensselaer Polytechnic Institute (BS); Johns Hopkins University (MS)
- Spouse: Carroll Taylor (m. 2003; died 2020)
- Children: 2
- Awards: Air Medal
- Space career

NASA astronaut (emeritus)
- Rank: Captain, United States Navy
- Time in space: 174 days, 9 hours, 33 minutes
- Selection: NASA Group 20 (2009)
- Total EVAs: 2
- Total EVA time: 12 hours, 47 minutes
- Mission: Soyuz TMA-13M (Expedition 40/41); Artemis II
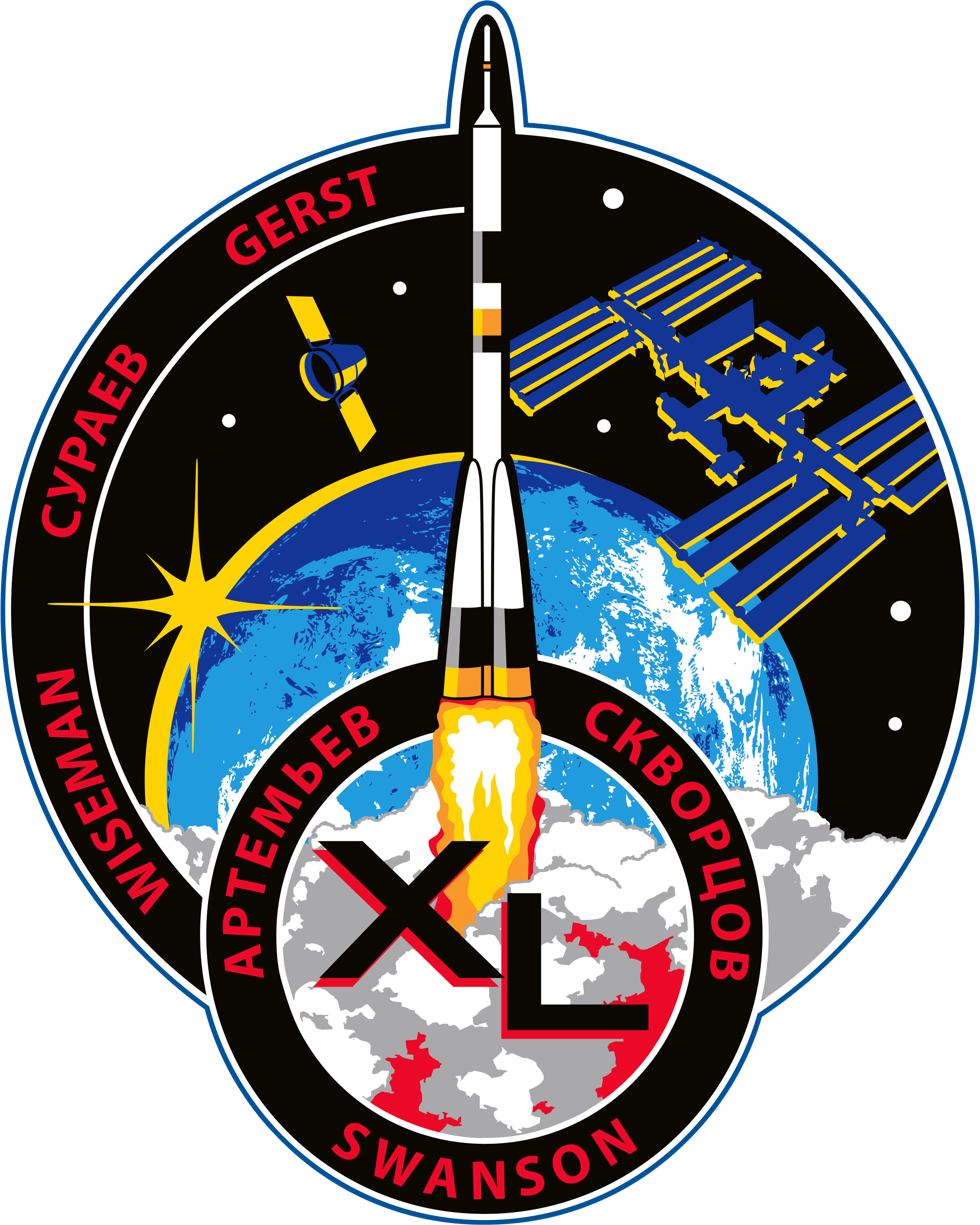
- Mission insignia
- Retired: September 9, 2026 (emeritus status)

Gregory Reid Wiseman (born November 11, 1975) is a United States Navy captain, test pilot, and NASA astronaut (emeritus). He was the commander of the 2026 Artemis II lunar flyby mission, the first crewed flight around the Moon since Apollo 17 in 1972. He served as the 17th chief of the Astronaut Office from 2020 to 2022. In October 2026, he was named associate vice president of the California Institute of Technology (Caltech) and deputy director of the Jet Propulsion Laboratory (JPL).

Selected as a NASA astronaut in 2009, he flew to the International Space Station in 2014 as part of Expedition 40/41 and earlier served as a U.S. Navy fighter pilot and test pilot.

On April 1, 2026, he launched on Artemis II, becoming the first commander of a lunar mission since Gene Cernan on Apollo 17 and the oldest person to travel beyond low Earth orbit at age 50. He and his crew also became the humans that have traveled the farthest from Earth.

== Early life and education ==
Gregory Reid Wiseman was born on November 11, 1975, in Baltimore, Maryland, to Judith Eileen (née Sweitzer) and William Joseph Wiseman III. His father was a Baltimore County government employee, first as an attorney and later as a zoning commissioner, and his mother was an administrative assistant for an insurance company.

Wiseman grew up in the Springdale neighborhood of Cockeysville. He attended Dulaney High School where he played golf, was part of the drumline, and a member of the Russian club. He graduated from Dulaney in 1993, and earned a BS degree in computer and systems engineering from Rensselaer Polytechnic Institute in Troy, New York in 1997. He later received an MS degree in systems engineering from Johns Hopkins University in Baltimore in 2006.

== Navy career ==
Wiseman was commissioned through the Naval Reserve Officers Training Corps (NROTC) program following his graduation from Rensselaer Polytechnic Institute in 1997 and reported to Naval Air Station Pensacola, Florida, for flight training. He was designated a Naval Aviator in 1999 and reported to Fighter Squadron 101 at Naval Air Station Oceana, Virginia, for transition to the F-14 Tomcat. After completing his initial training, Wiseman was assigned to Fighter Squadron 31, also at NAS Oceana, and made two deployments to the Middle East in support of Operations Southern Watch, Enduring Freedom, and Iraqi Freedom.

During his second deployment in 2003, Wiseman was selected to attend the U.S. Naval Test Pilot School (USNTPS) at Naval Air Station Patuxent River, Maryland, as part of USNTPS Class 125. Following his graduation in June 2004, he was assigned as a Test Pilot and project officer at Air Test and Evaluation Squadron Two Three (VX-23) at NAS Patuxent River. At VX-23, he earned his master's degree and worked on a range of flight-test programs involving the F-35C Lightning II, F/A-18 Hornet weapons separation, ship suitability, and the T-45 Goshawk.

After completing his tour at NAS Patuxent River, Wiseman reported to Carrier Air Wing Seventeen (CVW-17) as the strike operations officer, where he completed a deployment around South America. He was subsequently assigned to Strike Fighter Squadron 103 at NAS Oceana, flying the F/A-18F Super Hornet. He was deployed to the Middle East when he was selected for astronaut training. During his service with various U.S. Navy units, Wiseman received the Air Medal with Combat V (five awards), the Navy and Marine Corps Commendation Medal with Combat V (four awards), the Navy and Marine Corps Achievement Medal, and multiple campaign and service decorations.

== NASA career ==
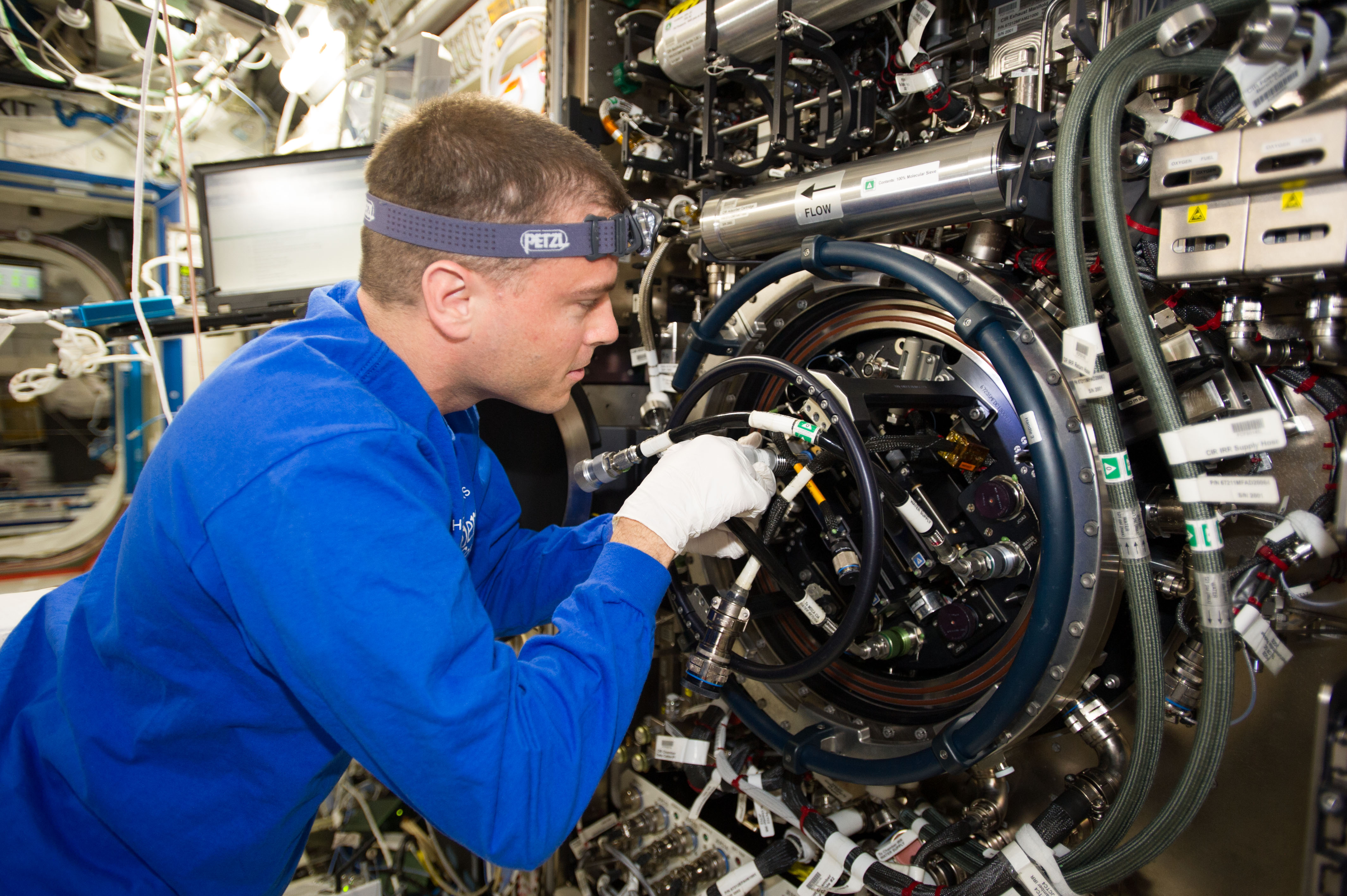
Wiseman working in the Destiny module of the ISS in August 2014

On June 29, 2009, NASA announced Wiseman's selection as one of nine candidates from 3,500 applicants to begin astronaut training. At the time, he was serving as a lieutenant commander in the U.S. Navy, flying with Strike Fighter Squadron 103 aboard the aircraft carrier USS Dwight D. Eisenhower (CVN 69) and based at NAS Oceana, Virginia. Wiseman has said that he frequently attended U.S. Navy Blue Angels air shows in his youth, and developed a strong desire to become an astronaut after witnessing a Space Shuttle launch in person in 2001.

=== Expedition 40/41 ===
Wiseman served as a flight engineer on the Expedition 40/41 crew about the International Space Station crew. The six‑month mission lasted from May to November 2014. He launched at 19:57 UTC on May 28, 2014, and returned to Earth at 03:58 UTC on November 10, 2014.

=== Aquanaut ===
In 2016, Wiseman participated in NASA's Extreme Environment Mission Operations (NEEMO) program as an aquanaut.

=== Chief of the Astronaut Office ===
Wiseman was appointed chief of the Astronaut Office on December 18, 2020, succeeding Patrick Forrester. He had previously served as Forrester's deputy chief. He stepped down from the position on November 14, 2022, to return to the active flight rotation.

=== Artemis II ===
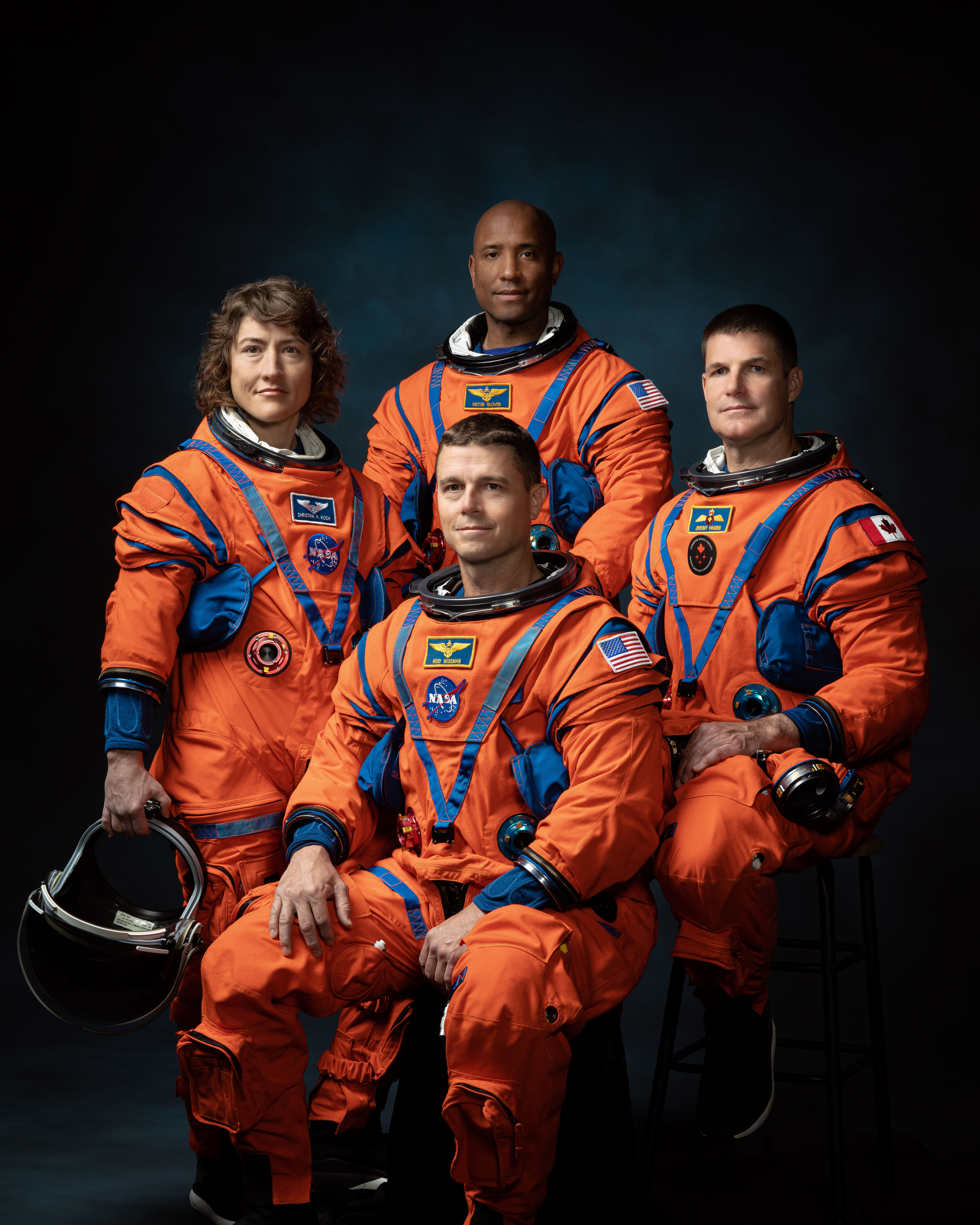
Official crew portrait for Artemis II, from left: NASA astronauts Christina Koch, Victor Glover, Wiseman, and Canadian Space Agency astronaut Jeremy Hansen

Only one chance in this lifetime, video by Wiseman showing Earthset from the crew's perspective.

On April 3, 2023, Wiseman was selected as the commander for the Artemis II lunar flyby mission, which flew in early April 2026. He was joined by NASA astronauts Christina Koch and Victor Glover, and Canadian Space Agency astronaut Jeremy Hansen. They launched on April 1, 2026. As mission commander, Wiseman was responsible for crew safety, mission execution, and resolving in‑flight issues. The crew of Artemis II reached the farthest distance from Earth that humans have traveled, surpassing the previous record set by Apollo 13. During the mission, Wiseman took the image Hello, World and captured a video of Earth setting behind the Moon.

In September 2026, NASA announced that Wiseman had transitioned to emeritus status, making him no longer eligible for flight, but allowing him to donate his time to train and mentor other NASA employees, while offering the flexibility to pursue other opportunities.

=== Caltech and JPL ===
On October 28, 2026, Caltech announced Wiseman's appointment as associate vice president and deputy director of JPL, which Caltech manages for NASA. His appointment is effective November 30, 2026. His responsibilities will include overseeing laboratory operations, coordinating institutional planning and regulatory compliance with Caltech, and serving as JPL's principal liaison for national security programs.

== Personal life ==
Wiseman was married to Carroll Taylor-Wiseman, a NICU nurse, until her death from cancer in 2020. They have two daughters, Ellie and Katey. On April 6, 2026, while on the Artemis II mission, Wiseman's fellow astronaut Jeremy Hansen formally requested that a newly discovered crater on the Moon be named Carroll, after Wiseman's late wife.

Wiseman is a fan of the Baltimore Orioles and Baltimore Ravens. In September 2026, he threw the ceremonial first pitch at the Orioles game against the Milwaukee Brewers, and led pregame festivities at the Ravens' home opener against the New Orleans Saints.

== Honors ==
In June 2026, the Baltimore County Council honored Wiseman with a resolution honoring him and his contributions to the Artemis II mission. Baltimore County Executive Kathy Klausmeier also gifted his father a special citation, as well as hats, pins, and a Baltimore County flag.

In September 2026, Wiseman served as the grand marshal of Dulaney High School's homecoming parade, after which Klausmeier unveiled Reid Wiseman Way, which would be located on the intersection of Padonia and Treherne roads in Timonium, and presented Wiseman with an enlarged replica of the street sign for Reid Wiseman Way.

Preceded by Patrick G. Forrester	Chief of the Astronaut Office; 2020–2022	Succeeded by Joseph M. Acaba
