= Weizmann (surname) =

Weizmann or Weizman is an Ashkenazi Jewish surname. Notable people with this surname include:

- Chaim Weizmann (1874–1952), chemist, statesman, President of the World Zionist Organization, first President of Israel and research institute founder
- Eyal Weizman (* 1970), a British Israeli architect
- Ezer Weizman (1924–2005), the seventh President of the State of Israel (1993–2000)
- Maria Weizmann (1893–1974), sister of Israeli politician and notable scientist Chaim Weizmann
- Martin Weitzman (1942–2019), economist and Professor of Economics at Harvard University
- Reuma Weizman (1925–2025), First Lady of Israel, wife of Ezer Weizman
- Vera Weizmann (1881–1966), wife of Chaim Weizmann, medical doctor and a Zionist activist

== See also ==
- Weitzmann
- Weitsman
