= Nature Neuroscience =

- Discipline: Neuroscience
- Language: English
- Edited by: Shari Wiseman

Publication details
- History: 1998–present
- Publisher: Nature Publishing Group
- Impact factor: 19.5 (2024)

Standard abbreviations
- ISO 4: Nat. Neurosci.

Indexing
- CODEN: NANEFN
- ISSN: 1097-6256 (print); 1546-1726 (web)
- LCCN: 98657741
- OCLC no.: 38213290

Links
- Journal homepage

Nature Neuroscience is a monthly scientific journal published by Nature Publishing Group. Its focus is original research papers relating specifically to neuroscience and was established in May 1998. The chief editor is Shari Wiseman. According to the Journal Citation Reports, Nature Neuroscience had a 2024 impact factor of 19.5.
