= Jeremy Hansen =

Canadian astronaut (born 1976)

Jeremy Hansen MSC CD FRCGS
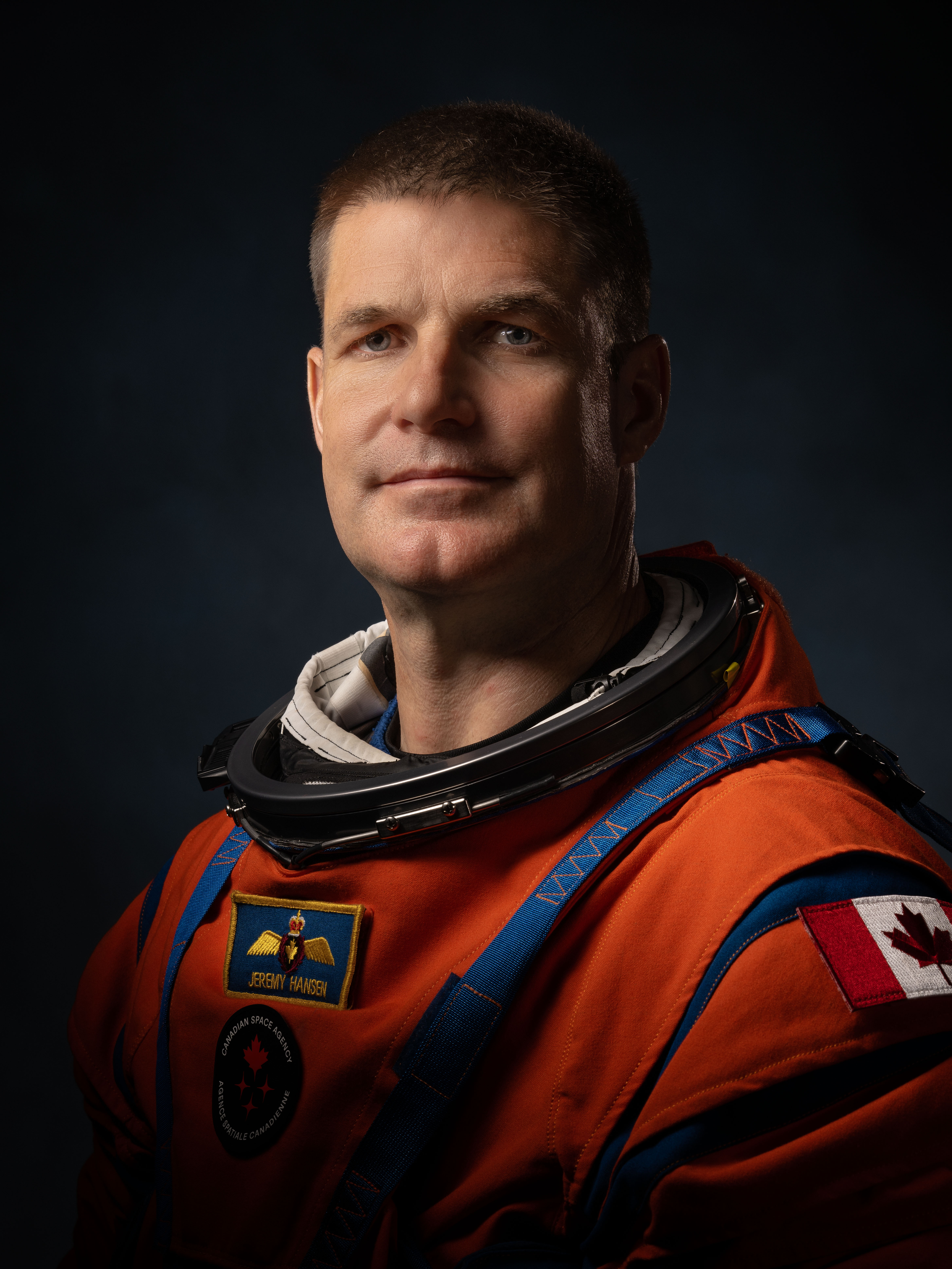
- Hansen in 2023
- Born: Jeremy Roger Hansen; January 27, 1976 (age 50); London, Ontario, Canada
- Education: Royal Military College of Canada (BSc, MSc)
- Spouse: Catherine Hansen
- Children: 3
- Awards: Canadian Forces' Decoration (2006); Gold Medal of the Royal Canadian Geographical Society (2014); Congressional Space Medal of Honor (2026); Meritorious Service Cross (2026)
- Space career

CSA astronaut
- Time in space: 9 days, 1 hour, 32 minutes
- Selection: 2009 CSA Group; NASA Group 20 (2009)
- Missions: Artemis II
- Retired: September 2026
- Military career
- Allegiance: Canada
- Branch: Royal Canadian Air Force
- Service years: 1994–present
- Rank: Colonel
- Hansen's voice Hansen requesting the naming of Carroll crater Recorded April 7, 2026

Jeremy Roger Hansen (born January 27, 1976) is a Royal Canadian Air Force colonel and retired CSA astronaut. As a mission specialist on Artemis II in April 2026, he became the only person not from the United States to travel beyond low Earth orbit and to travel to the vicinity of the Moon. (Note: Hansen is the third astronaut not born in the United States to have flown beyond low Earth orbit. William Anders, who flew on Apollo 8, was born in Hong Kong, and Michael Collins, who flew on Apollo 11, was born in Rome. Both were born to American parents and thus American citizens, and were American astronauts on their respective missions.) He is also among the humans who have travelled the farthest from Earth, having broken Apollo 13's distance record with the rest of the Artemis II crew.

Hansen was selected by the Canadian Space Agency in the 2009 astronaut recruitment alongside David Saint-Jacques. Before joining the astronaut corps, Hansen served as a Royal Canadian Air Force captain, piloting the CF-18 fighter jet at CFB Cold Lake, Alberta, and was later promoted to the rank of colonel.

In July 2026, Hansen announced his retirement from the CSA's astronaut program in September, planning to pursue new opportunities in Canada's space program.

== Early life and education ==
Jeremy Roger Hansen was born on January 27, 1976, in London, Ontario, to Nancy Good and Gary Hansen. His paternal grandfather Magnus Hansen emigrated from Denmark to Canada in 1929. He was raised on a farm near Ailsa Craig before moving to Ingersoll for his high school education.

At age 12, he joined 614 Royal Canadian Air Cadet Squadron in London, Ontario.

After graduating from Ingersoll District Collegiate Institute, Hansen attended the Royal Military College in Kingston, Ontario, where he completed a Bachelor of Science (Honours) degree in space science in 1999 with First Class Honours.

He later earned a Master of Science degree in physics from the Royal Military College in 2000, with research focused on wide field‑of‑view satellite tracking.

== Career ==
In 2013, Hansen served as a cavenaut in the European Space Agency's CAVES training programme in Sardinia, alongside Satoshi Furukawa, Michael Barratt, Jack Fischer, Aleksey Ovchinin, and Paolo Nespoli.

On June 10, 2014, NASA announced that Hansen would take part in the NEEMO 19 undersea exploration mission as an aquanaut aboard the Aquarius underwater laboratory. The mission began on September 7, 2014, and lasted seven days.

=== Artemis II ===
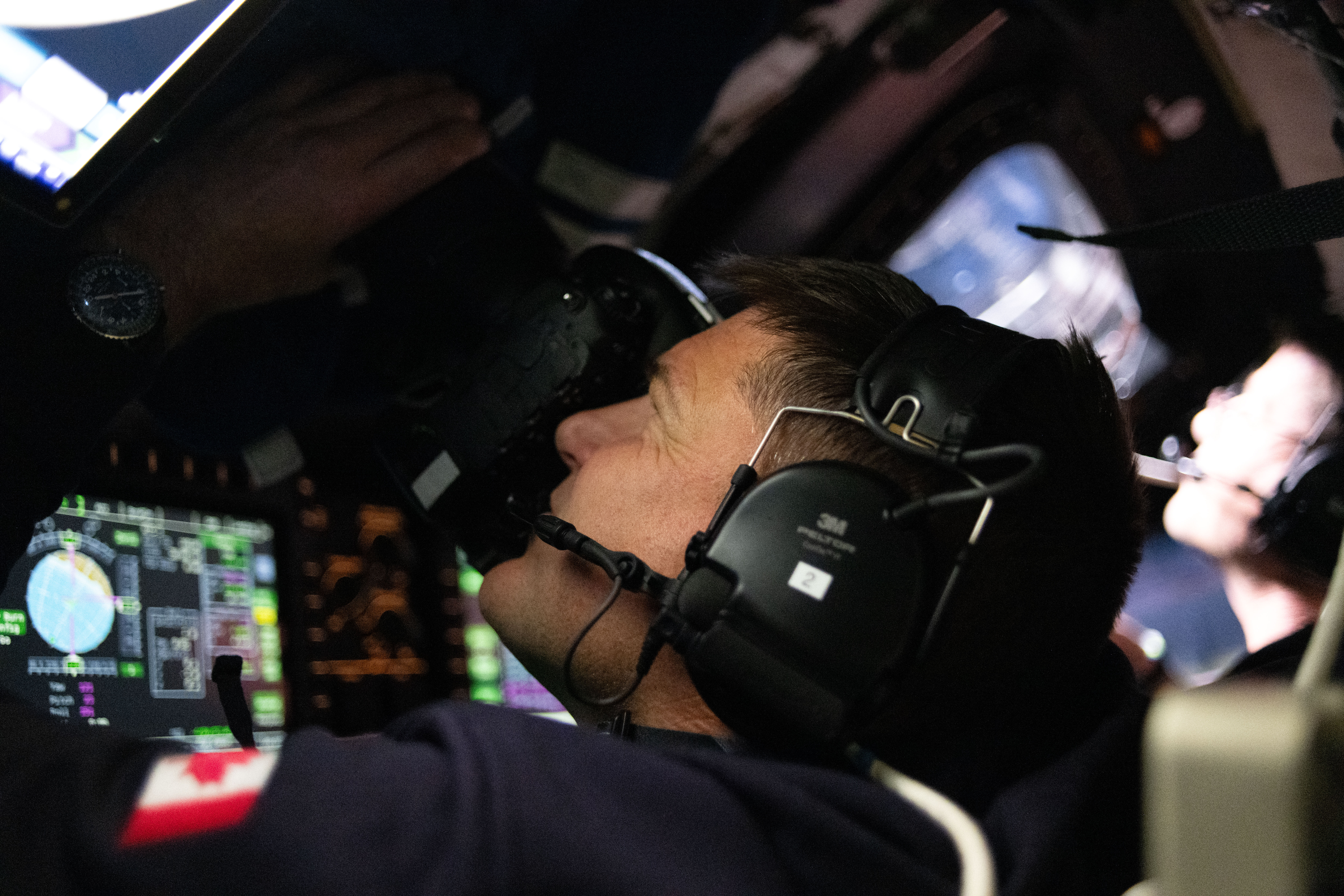
Hansen taking images through the Integrity window early in the 2026 Artemis II lunar flyby

On April 3, 2023, Hansen was announced as the first Canadian to travel to the vicinity of the Moon, as part of the Artemis II mission. On April 1, 2026, he launched as a mission specialist of Artemis II and flew around the Moon on April 6 before returning via splashdown in the Pacific Ocean on April 10. He became the first non‑American astronaut to travel beyond low Earth orbit and the first to journey to the vicinity of the Moon. He is also, along with the other Artemis II crew members, among the humans who have travelled the farthest from Earth.

=== Retirement from the Canadian Space Agency ===
Hansen announced his retirement from the astronaut program of the CSA on July 6, 2026. Effective in September 2026, his retirement from active astronaut training is intended to facilitate opportunities for "creative, ongoing ways to support and enable the vital work happening in Canada with respect to space."

== Personal life ==
Hansen is married to Catherine Hansen, a medical doctor and expert in women's health, and has three children. Hansen is interested in Indigenous knowledge. His mission patch for Artemis II was designed by Anishinaabe artist Henry Guimond of Sagkeeng First Nation, and references the Teachings of the Seven Grandfathers. His hobbies include mountain biking, rock climbing, and sailboating.

== Honours and awards ==
- Canadian Forces' Decoration – 12 years of service (October 2006)
- Royal Canadian Air Force pilot wings (May 2002)
- Clancy Scheldrup Memorial Trophy – outstanding graduate on the Basic Flying Course (2001)
- Air Cadet League of Canada Award – top air force graduate from the Royal Military College of Canada (May 1999)
- Fellow of the Royal Canadian Geographical Society (FRCGS)
- Gold Medal of the Royal Canadian Geographical Society (2014)
- Queen Elizabeth II Diamond Jubilee Medal (2012)
- King Charles III Coronation Medal – British version for contribution to the coronation (May 2023)
- Canada's flag bearer for the Coronation of Charles III and Camilla
- Calgary Stampede Parade Marshal (2023)
- Congressional Space Medal of Honor (2026)
- Meritorious Service Cross (2026)
