= Expedition 42 =

Long-duration mission to the International Space Station

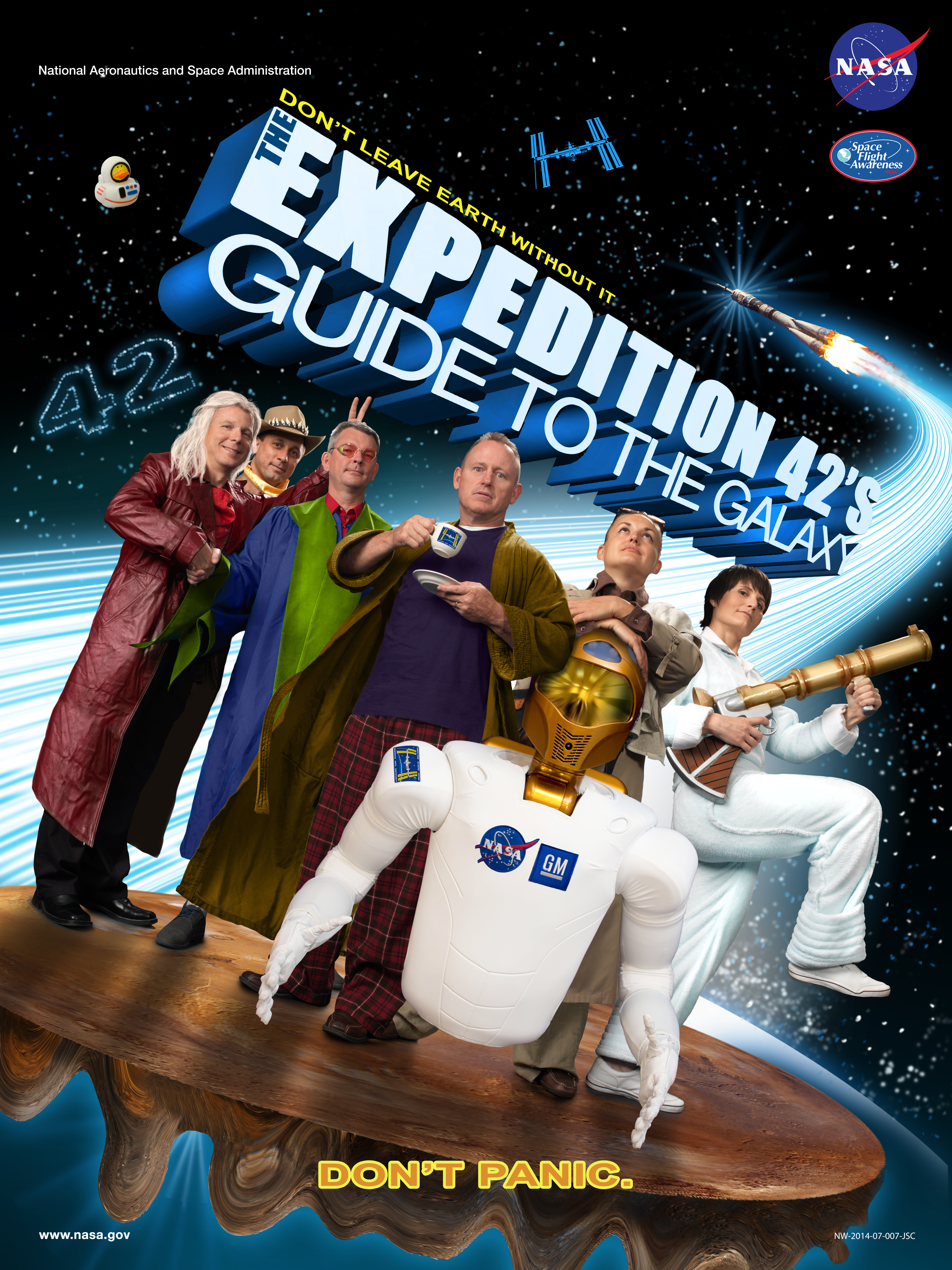
- Promotional Poster
- Mission type: Long-duration expedition

Expedition
- Space station: International Space Station
- Began: 10 November 2014 UTC
- Ended: 11 March 2015 UTC
- Arrived aboard: Soyuz TMA-14M; Soyuz TMA-15M
- Departed aboard: Soyuz TMA-14M; Soyuz TMA-15M

Crew
- Crew size: 6
- Members: Expedition 41/42: Barry E. Wilmore; Aleksandr Samokutyayev; Yelena Serova Expedition 42/43: Anton Shkaplerov; Samantha Cristoforetti; Terry W. Virts
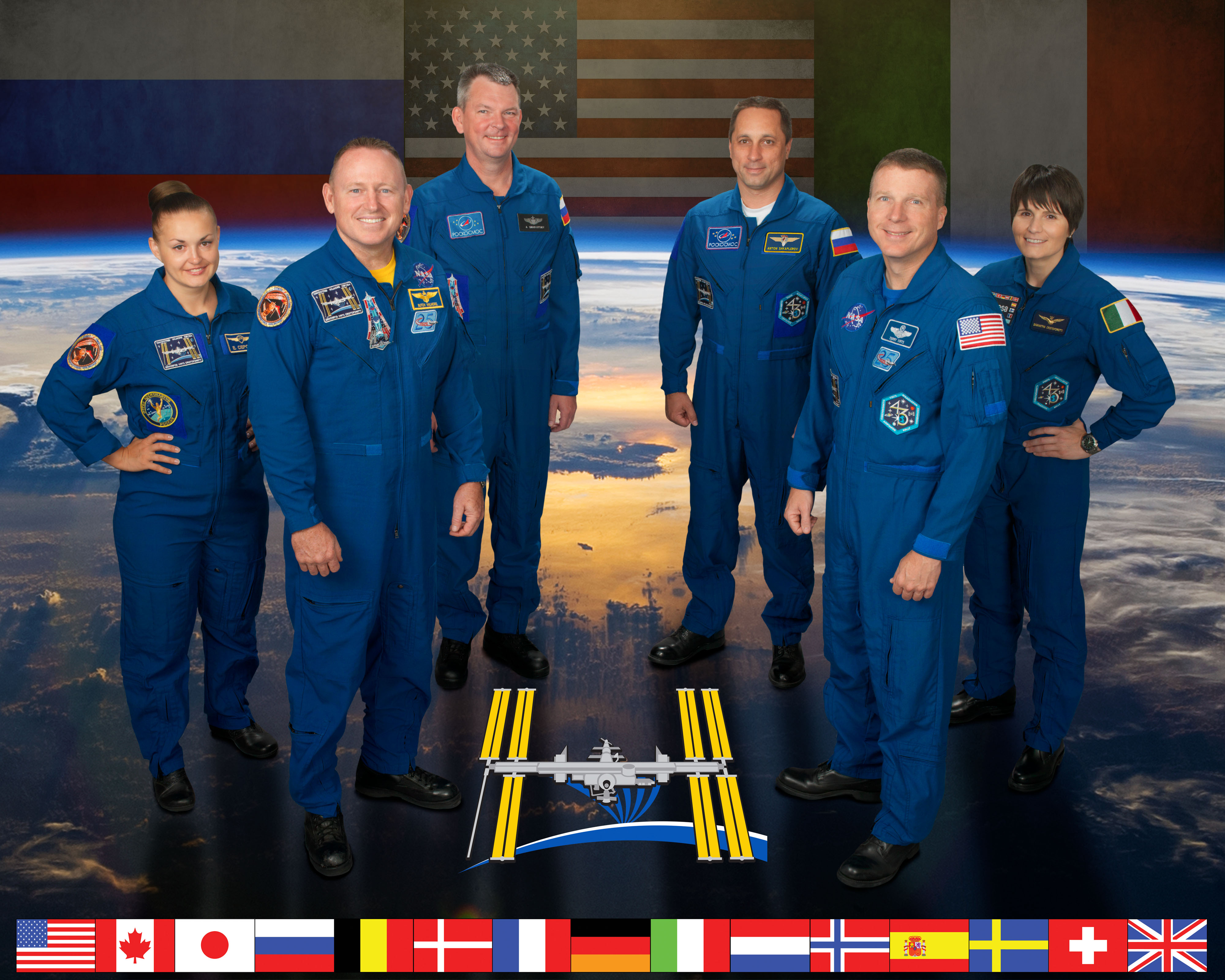
- Expedition 42 mission patch (l-r) Serova, Wilmore, Samokutyayev, Shkaplerov, Virts and Cristoforetti ISS expeditions

Expedition 42 was the 42nd expedition to the International Space Station. It began on 10 November 2014 with the undocking of Soyuz TMA-13M, returning the crew of Expedition 41 to Earth and ended with the undocking of Soyuz TMA-14M on 11 March 2015.

== Crew ==
Position	First Part (November 2014)	Second Part (November 2014 to March 2015)
Commander	Barry E. Wilmore, NASA; Second spaceflight	
Flight Engineer 1	Aleksandr Samokutyayev, RSA; Second and last spaceflight	
Flight Engineer 2	Yelena Serova, RSA; Only spaceflight	
Flight Engineer 3		Anton Shkaplerov, RSA; Second spaceflight
Flight Engineer 4		Samantha Cristoforetti, ASI-ESA; First spaceflight
Flight Engineer 5		Terry W. Virts, NASA; Second and last spaceflight

Source
Spacefacts

== Mission ==
One of the key aspects of Mission 42 – and other missions in 2015 – is the preparation (that is, reconfiguration) of parts of the ISS to allow commercial space taxis to dock at the station. The mission requires several space walks in 2015 to prepare a berthing slip is being prepared at the forward end of the Harmony connecting node where Space Shuttles formerly docked, and another on Harmony's zenith port. These new ports will allow for the Boeing's CST-100 and SpaceX's Dragon capsules to dock at the ISS. The first paid passengers are expected to arrive in 2019.

== In popular culture ==
- A fictionalized version of Expedition 42 is depicted in the 2013 film Gravity. The crew, never shown, is forced to evacuate the International Space Station in a Soyuz capsule before the orbital debris arrive.
- To commemorate the Expedition number's connection to Hitchhiker's Guide to the Galaxy comic science fiction franchise, the crew released a poster in the style of the 2005 film.
