= Soyuz TMA-14M =

2014 Russian crewed spaceflight to the ISS

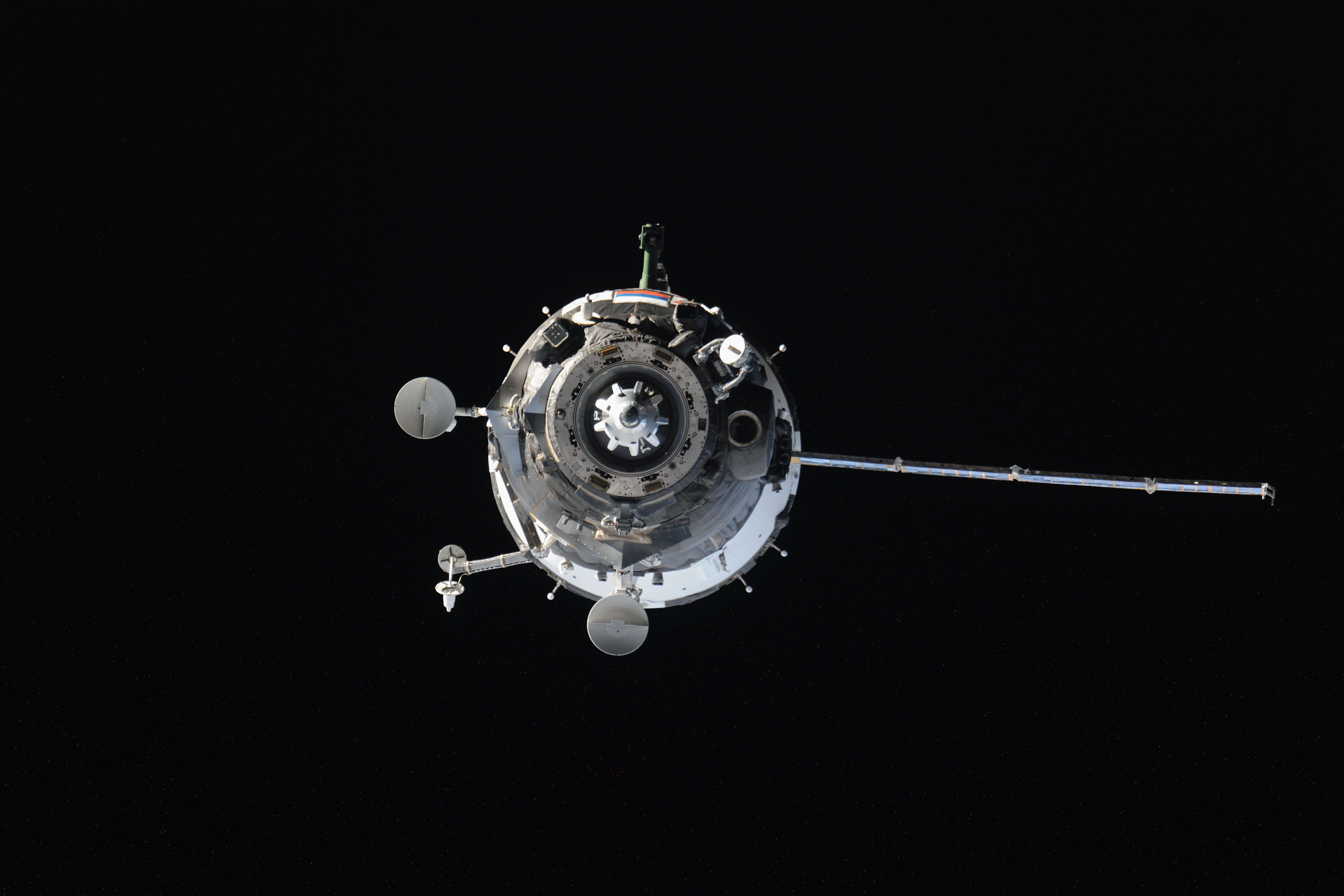
- Soyuz TMA-14M approaches the ISS with port solar array retracted, 26 September 2014
- Operator: Roscosmos
- COSPAR ID: 2014-057A
- SATCAT no.: 40246
- Mission duration: 167 days, 5 hours, 43 minutes

Spacecraft properties
- Spacecraft: Soyuz 11F732A47 No.714
- Spacecraft type: Soyuz-TMA 11F747
- Manufacturer: Energia

Crew
- Crew size: 3
- Members: Aleksandr Samokutyayev; Yelena Serova; Barry E. Wilmore

Start of mission
- Launch date: 25 September 2014, 20:25:00 UTC
- Rocket: Soyuz-FG
- Launch site: Baikonur 1/5, Kazakhstan

End of mission
- Landing date: 12 March 2015, 02:07 UTC
- Landing site: Kazakh Steppe, Kazakhstan

Orbital parameters
- Reference system: Geocentric
- Regime: Low Earth
- Perigee altitude: 176 kilometres (109 mi)
- Apogee altitude: 335 kilometres (208 mi)
- Inclination: 52.06 degrees
- Period: 89.48 minutes
- Epoch: 25 September 2014, 20:13:36 UTC

Docking with ISS
- Docking port: Poisk zenith
- Docking date: 26 September 2014; 02:11 UTC
- Undocking date: 11 March 2015; 22:44 UTC
- Time docked: 166 days, 20 hours, 33 minutes
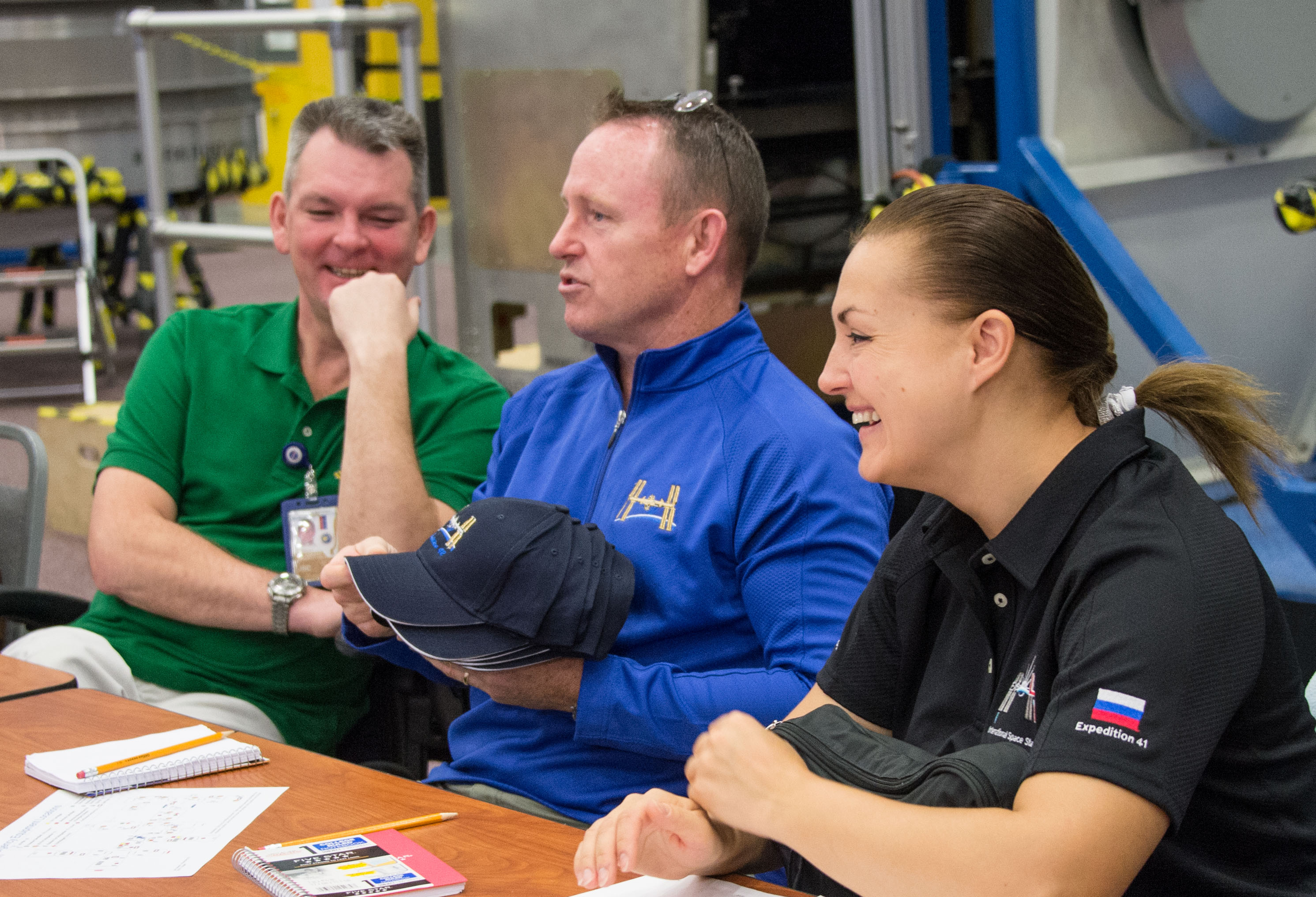
- (l-r) Samokutyayev, Wilmore and Serova Soyuz programme (Crewed missions)

Soyuz TMA-14M was a 2014 flight to the International Space Station. It transported three members of the Expedition 41 crew to the International Space Station. TMA-14M is the 123rd flight of a Soyuz spacecraft, the first flight launching in 1967. The Soyuz remained docked to the space station for the Expedition 42 increment to serve as an emergency escape vehicle until undocking and landing as scheduled in March 2015.

== Crew ==
Position	Crew Member
Commander	(Russia) Aleksandr Samokutyayev, Roscosmos; Expedition 41; Second and last spaceflight
Flight Engineer 1	(Russia) Yelena Serova, Roscosmos; Expedition 41; Only spaceflight
Flight Engineer 2	(United States) Barry E. Wilmore, NASA; Expedition 41; Second spaceflight

=== Backup crew ===
Position	Crew Member
Commander	(Russia) Gennady Padalka, Roscosmos
Flight Engineer 1	(Russia) Mikhail Korniyenko, Roscosmos
Flight Engineer 2	(United States) Scott Kelly, NASA

== Mission highlights ==
=== Launch, rendezvous and docking ===
Soyuz TMA-14M successfully launched aboard a Soyuz-FG rocket from the Baikonur Cosmodrome in Kazakhstan at 20:25 UTC on Thursday, 25 September 2014 (2:25 AM Friday 26 September local time). The spacecraft reached low Earth orbit approximately nine minutes after lift-off. After reaching orbit, the Soyuz spacecraft's port solar array failed to deploy, but eventually did deploy after docking with the ISS. According to NASA and the Russian Federal Space Agency, the solar array does not pose a threat to the success of the mission.

Following a four-orbit rendezvous, the spacecraft docked with the Poisk module of the International Space Station just under six hours after launch, at 02:11 UTC on Friday, 26 September. Hatches between the two spacecraft were opened at 04:06 UTC. At this time, the crew of TMA-14M joined the crew of Expedition 41, where they were scheduled to remain until the crew of Soyuz TMA-13M departed in November 2014. Samokutyayev, Serova and Wilmore transferred to the crew of Expedition 42 at that time.

=== Undocking and return to Earth ===
TMA-14M remained docked to the ISS—serving as an emergency escape vehicle—until March 11, 2015, when it departed and returned Samokutyayev, Serova and Wilmore to Earth. After undocking from the ISS at 22:44 UTC on 11 March, the spacecraft deorbited and its descent module along with the mission crew landed safely just over three hours later, at 02:07 UTC on 12 March.

== Gallery ==
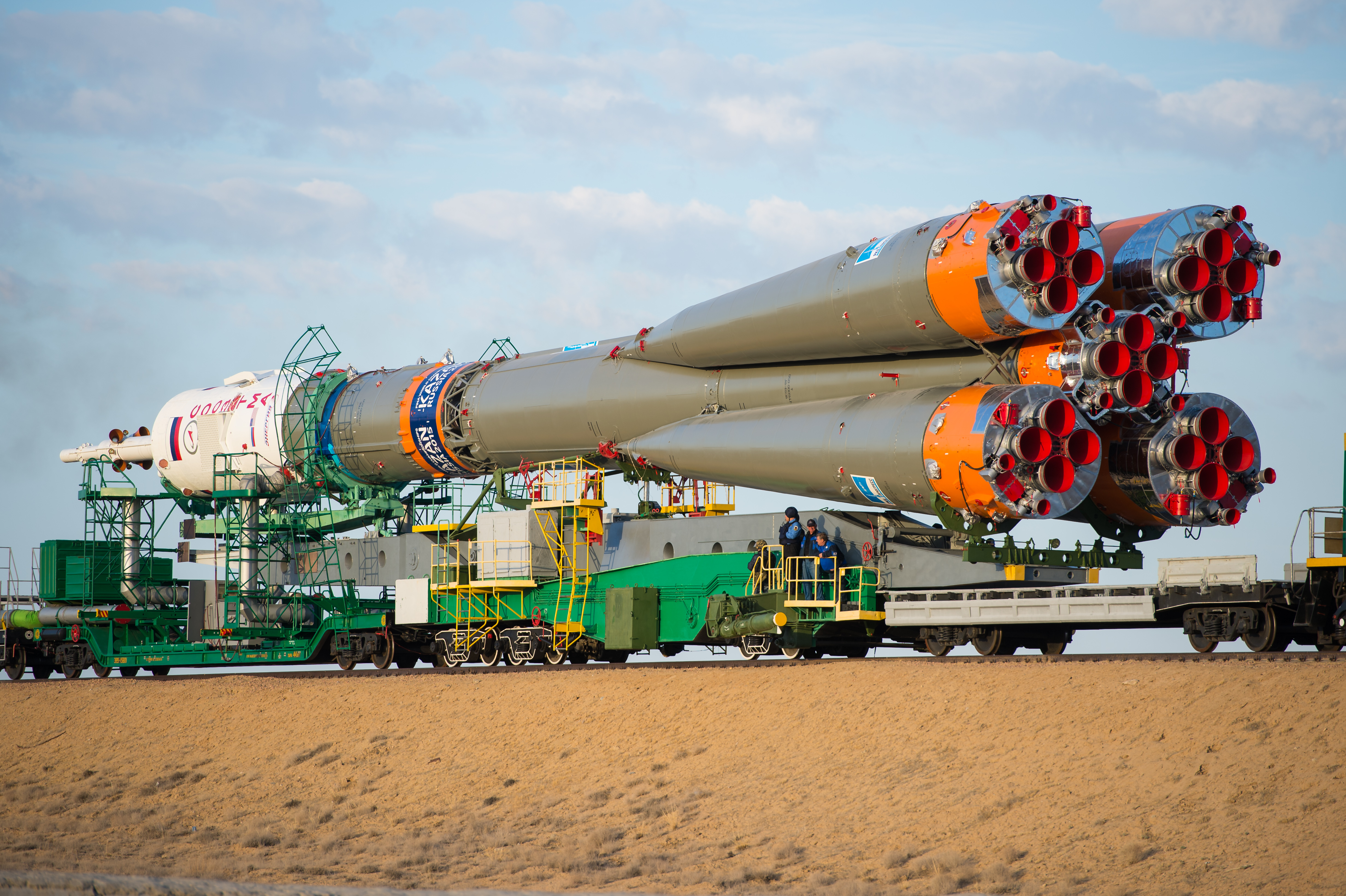
The Soyuz rocket being rolled out to the launch pad.

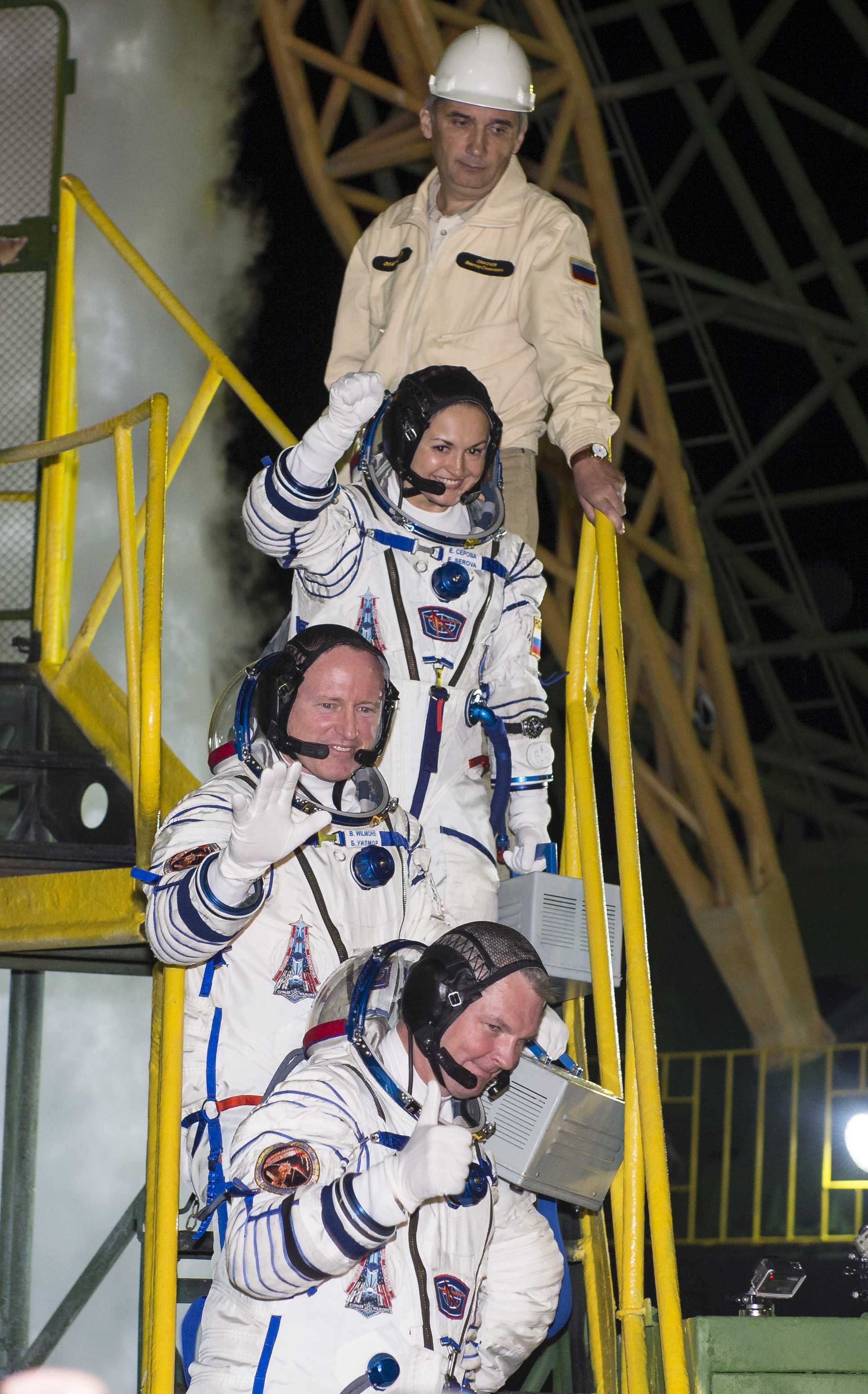
The crew waves to spectators before boarding the rocket.

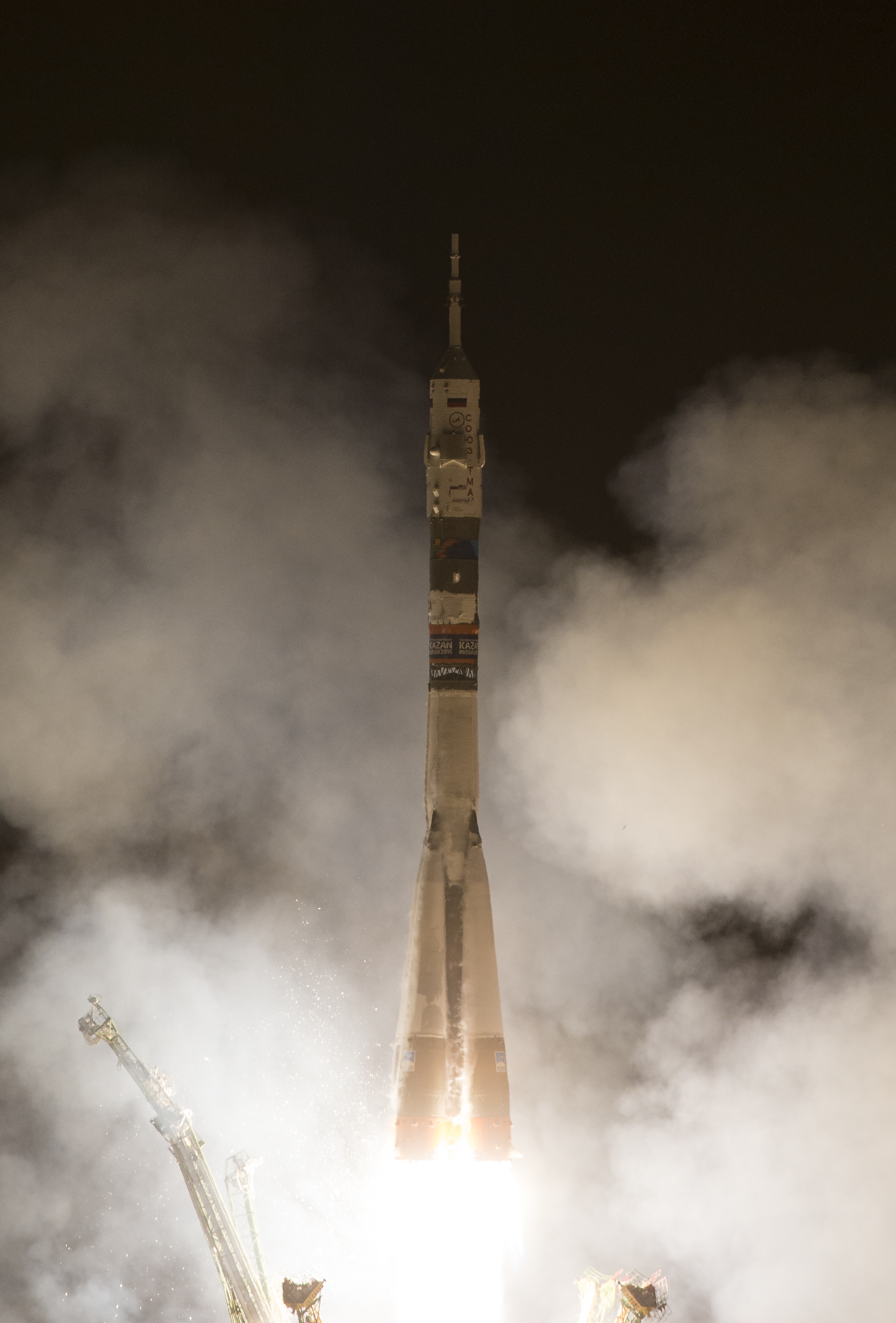
TMA-14M launches from the Baikonur Cosmodrome.

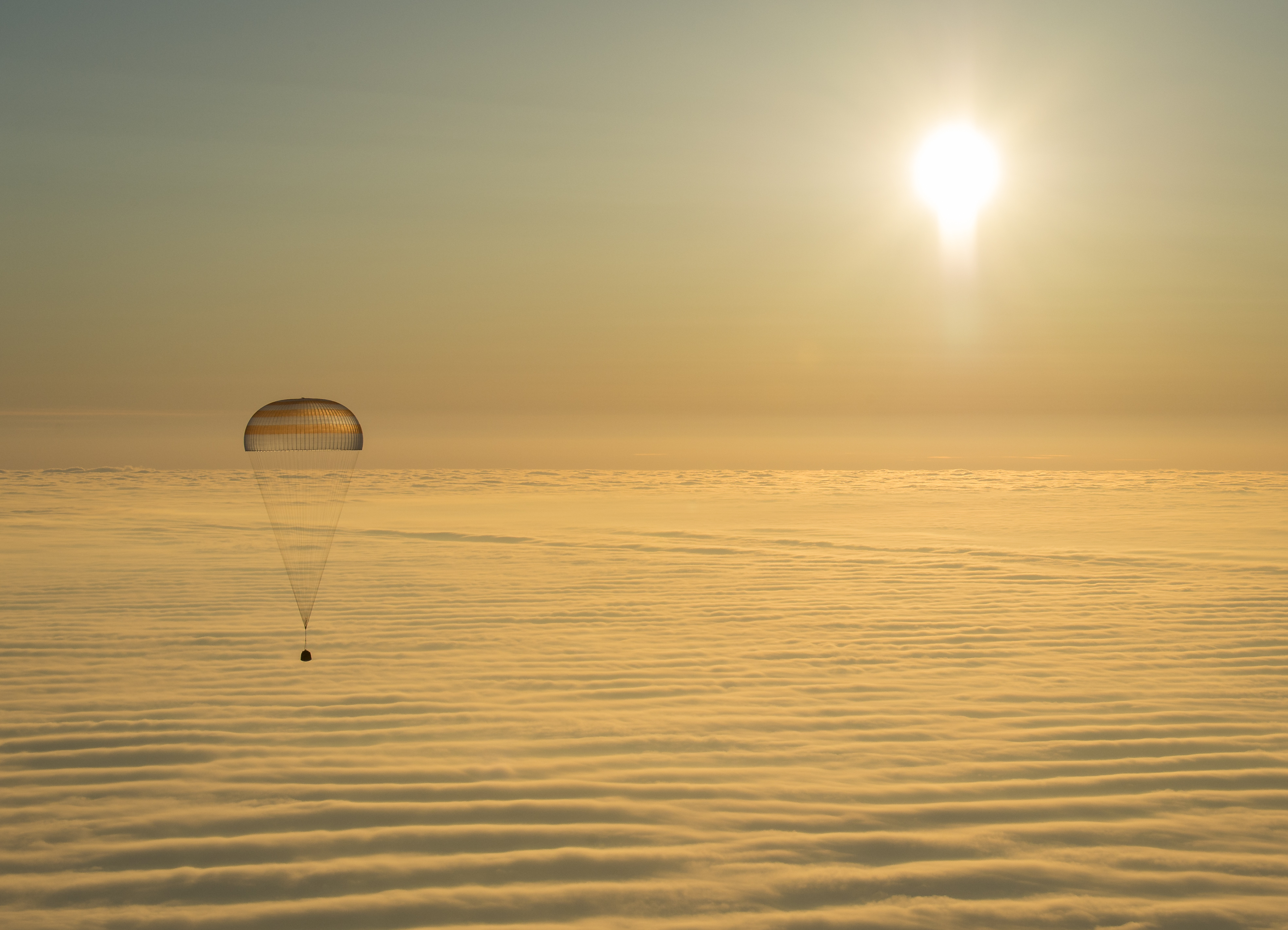
Descent of the spacecraft on 12 March, 2015.

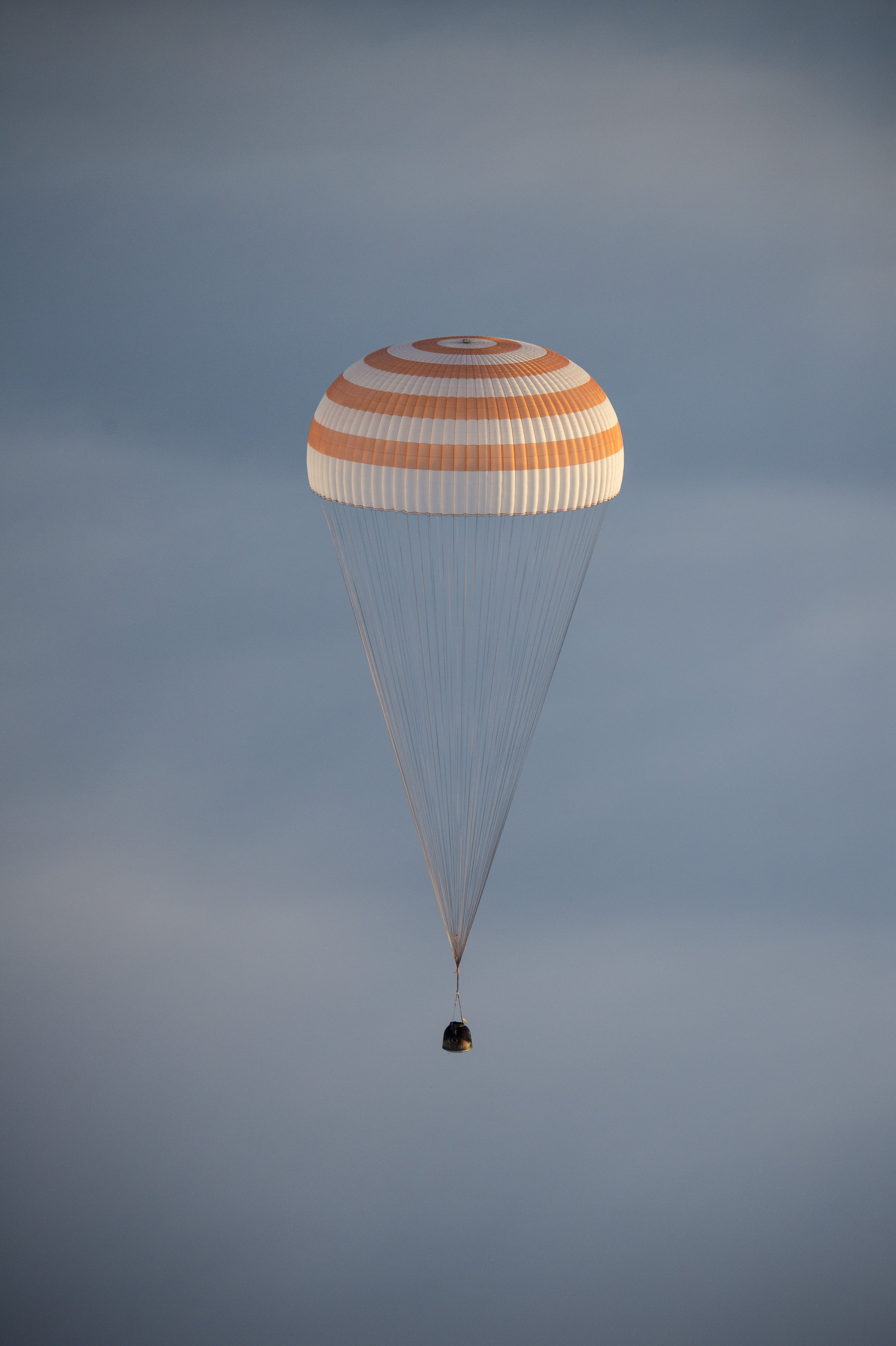
TMA-14M descending towards landing.

== In media ==
- In the 2014 film Gravity, STS-157 Mission Specialist Dr. Ryan Stone pilots the damaged Soyuz TMA-14M spacecraft in her travel from the ISS to the Chinese Tiangong-1 station and is able to hack the computer to separate the modules and activate the landing retrorockets in space as the capsule is out of fuel.
