= Soyuz TMA-12M =

2014 Russian crewed spaceflight to the ISS

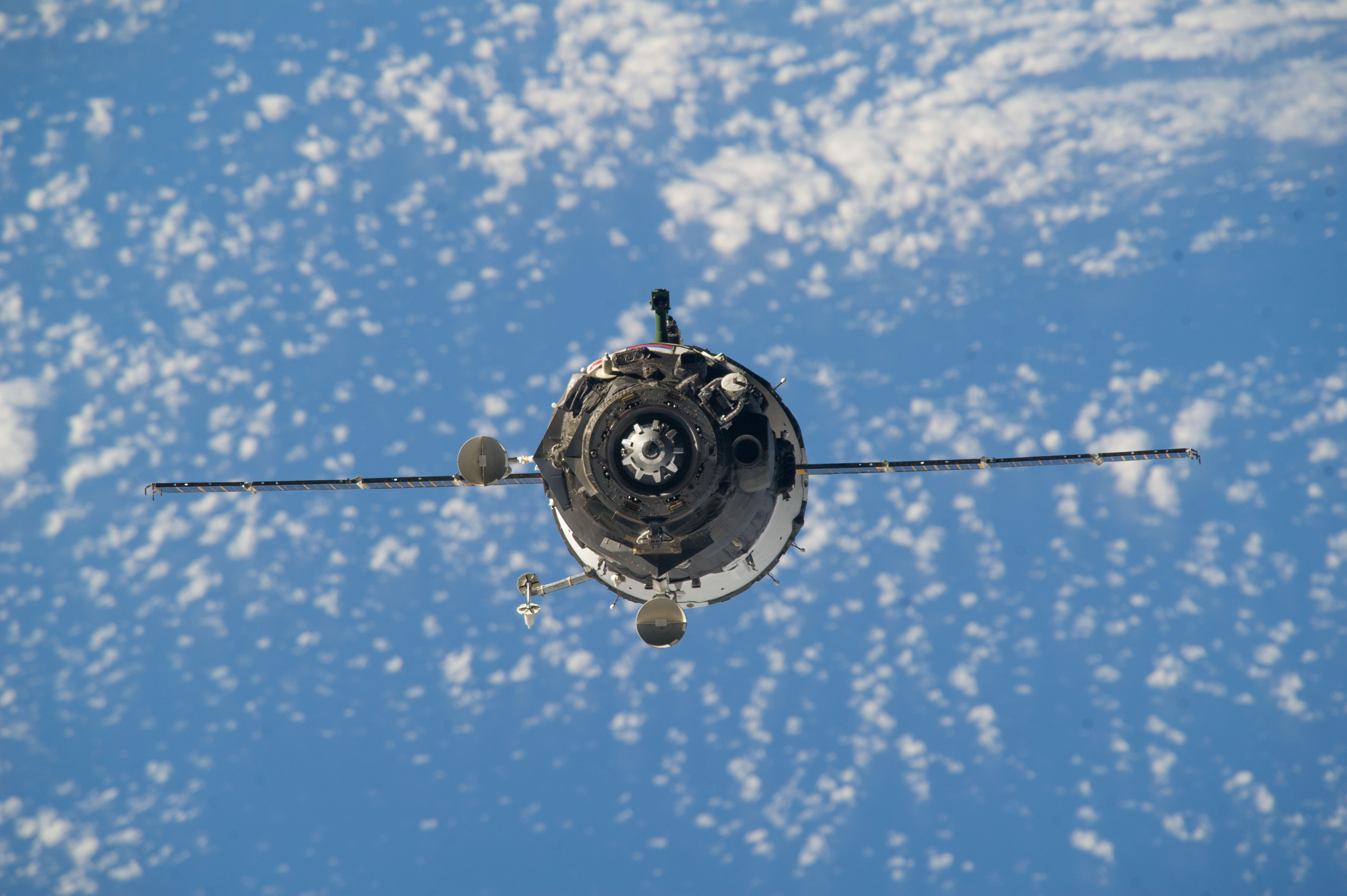
- Soyuz TMA-12M approaches the ISS, 27 March 2014.
- Mission type: ISS crew transport
- Operator: Roscosmos
- COSPAR ID: 2014-013A
- SATCAT no.: 39622
- Mission duration: 169 days, 5 hours, 6 minutes

Spacecraft properties
- Spacecraft: Soyuz 11F732A47 No.712
- Spacecraft type: Soyuz-TMA 11F747
- Manufacturer: Energia

Crew
- Crew size: 3
- Members: Aleksandr Skvortsov; Oleg Artemyev; Steven R. Swanson
- Callsign: Cliff

Start of mission
- Launch date: 25 March 2014, 21:17:23 UTC
- Rocket: Soyuz-FG
- Launch site: Baikonur 1/5, Kazakhstan

End of mission
- Landing date: 11 September 2014, 02:23 UTC
- Landing site: Kazakh Steppe, Kazakhstan

Orbital parameters
- Reference system: Geocentric
- Regime: Low Earth

Docking with ISS
- Docking port: Poisk zenith
- Docking date: 27 March 2014; 23:53 UTC
- Undocking date: 10 September 2014; 23:01 UTC
- Time docked: 166 days, 23 hours, 8 minutes
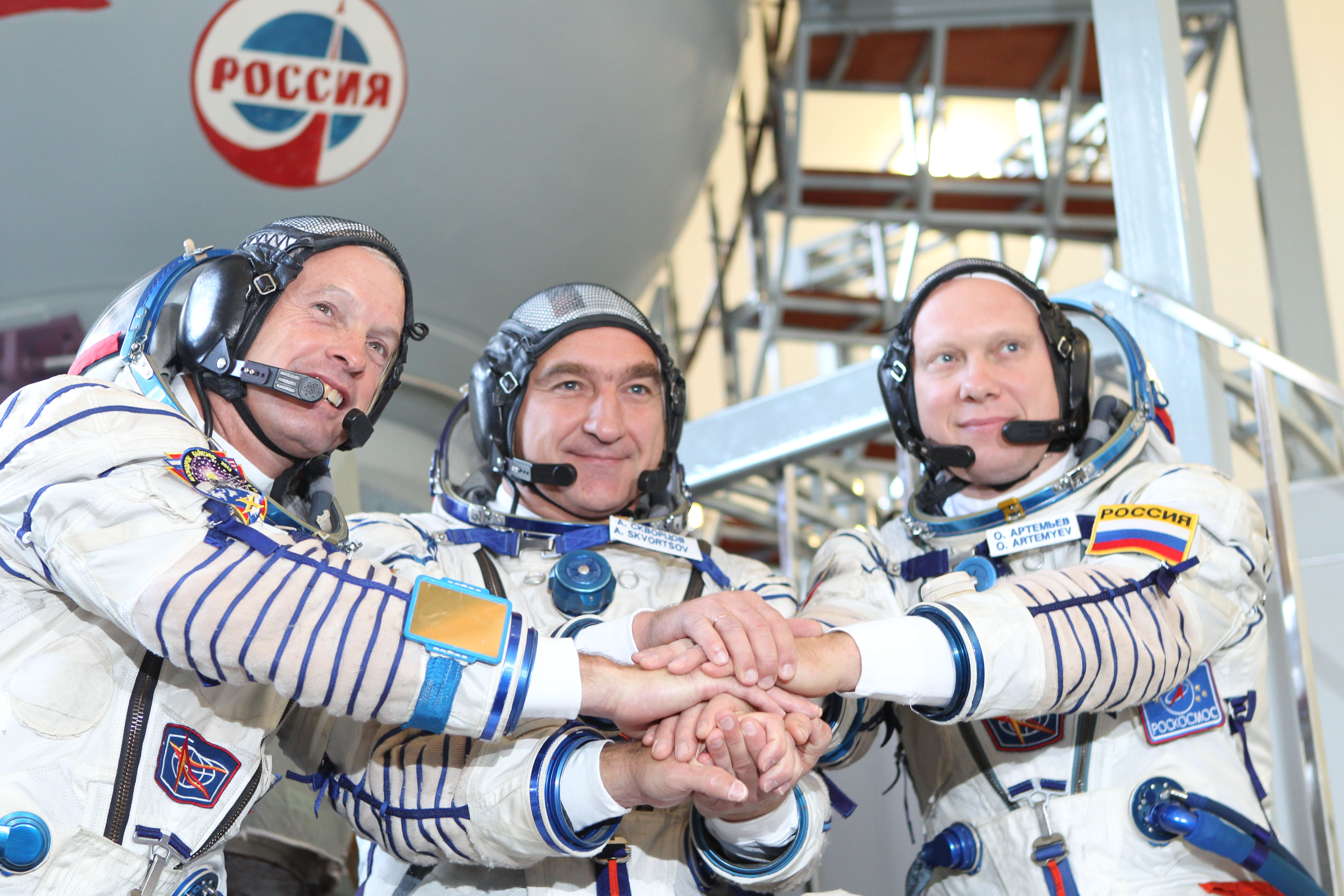
- (l-r) Swanson, Skvortsov and Artemyev Soyuz programme (Crewed missions)

Soyuz TMA-12M was a 2014 flight to the International Space Station. It transported three members of the Expedition 39 crew to the International Space Station. TMA-12M was the 121st flight of a Soyuz spacecraft since the first in 1967 and the 38th Soyuz mission to the ISS.

After a successful launch on 25 March 2014, docking was scheduled to occur on 26 March via the relatively new six-hour duration orbital trajectory. In the event, one of the orbital burns scheduled to refine the trajectory did not occur as planned, due to an attitude control problem in which the spacecraft was incorrectly oriented. The rendezvous phase was subsequently replanned to the formerly-used two-day trajectory. Accordingly, TMA-12M arrived at the ISS on 27 March. The Soyuz remained docked to the ISS to serve as an emergency escape vehicle until undocking and landing as scheduled on 11 September 2014.

== Crew ==
Position	Crew Member
Commander	(Russia) Aleksandr Skvortsov, Roscosmos; Expedition 39; Second spaceflight
Flight Engineer 1	(Russia) Oleg Artemyev, Roscosmos; Expedition 39; First spaceflight
Flight Engineer 2	(United States) Steven R. Swanson, NASA; Expedition 39; Third and last spaceflight

=== Backup crew ===
Position	Crew Member
Commander	(Russia) Aleksandr Samokutyayev, Roscosmos
Flight Engineer 1	(Russia) Yelena Serova, Roscosmos
Flight Engineer 2	(United States) Barry E. Wilmore, NASA

== Mission highlights ==
=== Launch ===
Soyuz TMA-12M successfully launched aboard a Soyuz-FG rocket from the Baikonur Cosmodrome in Kazakhstan at 21:17 UTC on Tuesday, 25 March 2014 (3:17 AM Wednesday 26 March local time). Approximately nine minutes later, the spacecraft reached low Earth orbit.

Because of the nighttime launch and the fact that the International Space Station was orbiting over Baikonur at the time of lift-off, the launch of TMA-12M was visible from the ISS and NASA astronaut Richard Mastracchio was able to take a photograph of the view (see below in gallery).

=== Rendezvous and docking ===
Originally, TMA-12M was scheduled to dock with the International Space Station's Poisk module at 03:04 UTC on 26 March 2014, with hatch opening scheduled for 04:45 UTC. The spacecraft was not able to perform the third course-correction successfully, however, and docking was rescheduled for Thursday, 27 March at 23:58 UTC at the earliest. The approach and docking phase of the mission was reverted to the previous two-day profile used in Soyuz flights before Soyuz TMA-08M, leaving the possibility of updating the mission profile after the nature of the issue was fully known. Initially, flight controllers suspected it was an issue with the attitude (orientation) control system. According to flight controllers, the crew was not in any danger and ample supplies were on board the Soyuz for the modified flight profile.

On 26 March, the first two maneuvers of the revised 34-orbit rendezvous plan occurred without incident, with docking scheduled for 27 March, although engineers had yet to determine the exact cause of the initial failure. Ultimately, the remainder of the rendezvous was nominal and TMA-12M successfully docked with the ISS at 23:53 UTC on 27 March, five minutes ahead of the rescheduled time, with hatch opening between the two spacecraft occurring at 02:35 UTC on 28 March.

Upon their arrival, Skvortsov, Artemyev and Swanson joined the crew of Expedition 39, as part of which they remained until they transferred to the crew of Expedition 40 after the May 2014 departure of Soyuz TMA-11M. The crew members of TMA-12M remained aboard the ISS until September 2014, when the spacecraft undocked and returned to Earth as scheduled.

=== Undocking and return to Earth ===
Expedition 40 commander Steven Swanson formally handed over command of the ISS to Expedition 41 commander Maksim Surayev on 9 September, the day before the mission's scheduled departure. After closing the hatches separating the station and Soyuz at 19:35 UTC on 10 September, TMA-12M undocked from the International Space Station at 23:01 UTC, ending the Expedition 40 mission and transferring control of the station to Expedition 41. The spacecraft executed a de-orbit burn at 01:30 UTC on 11 September and began re-entry at 2:01 UTC with landing occurring successfully in the Kazakh Steppe region of Kazakhstan at 2:23 UTC.

== Gallery ==
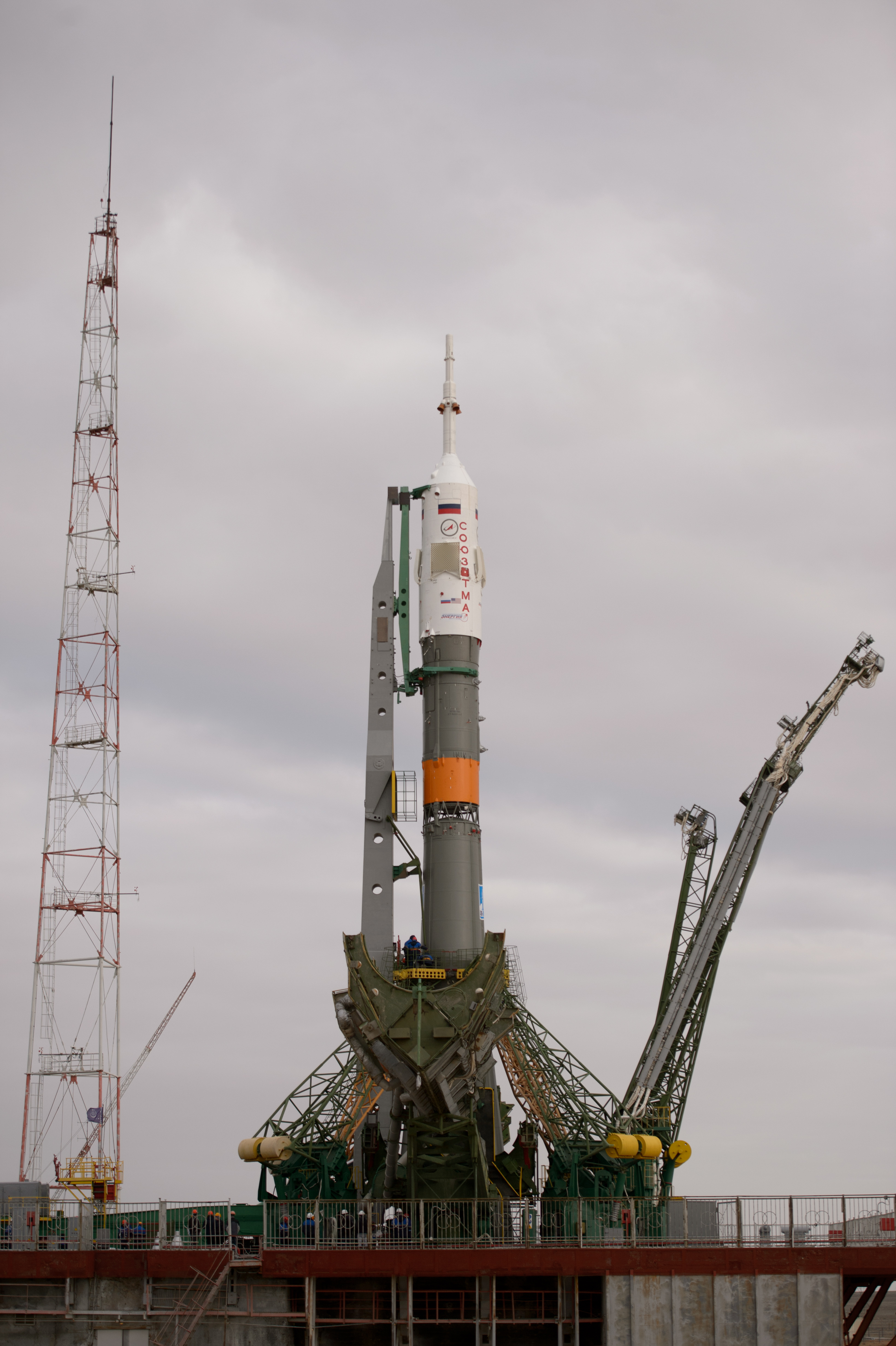
The Soyuz rocket on the launch pad shortly after rollout.

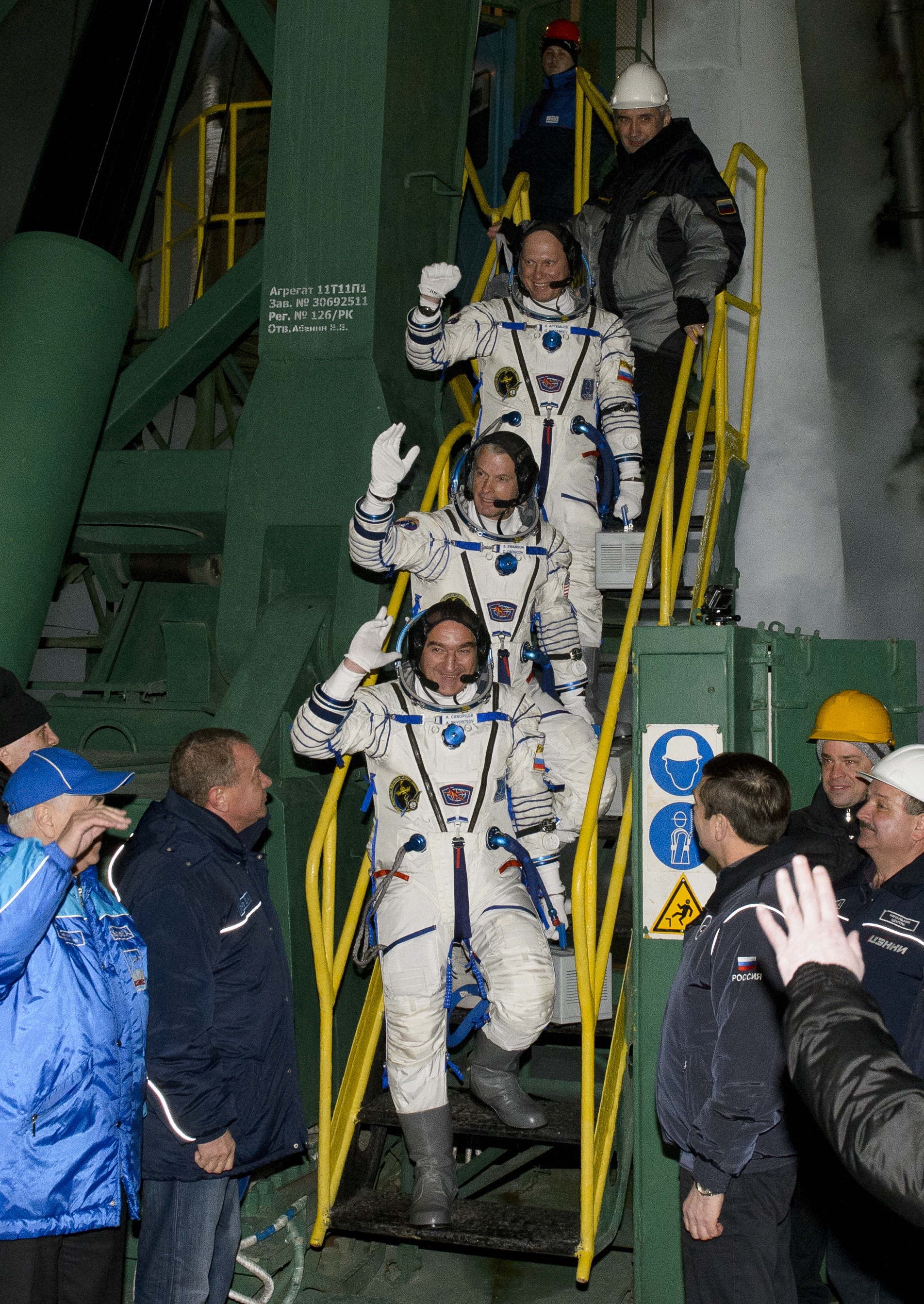
The TMA-12M crew members wave to spectators before launch.

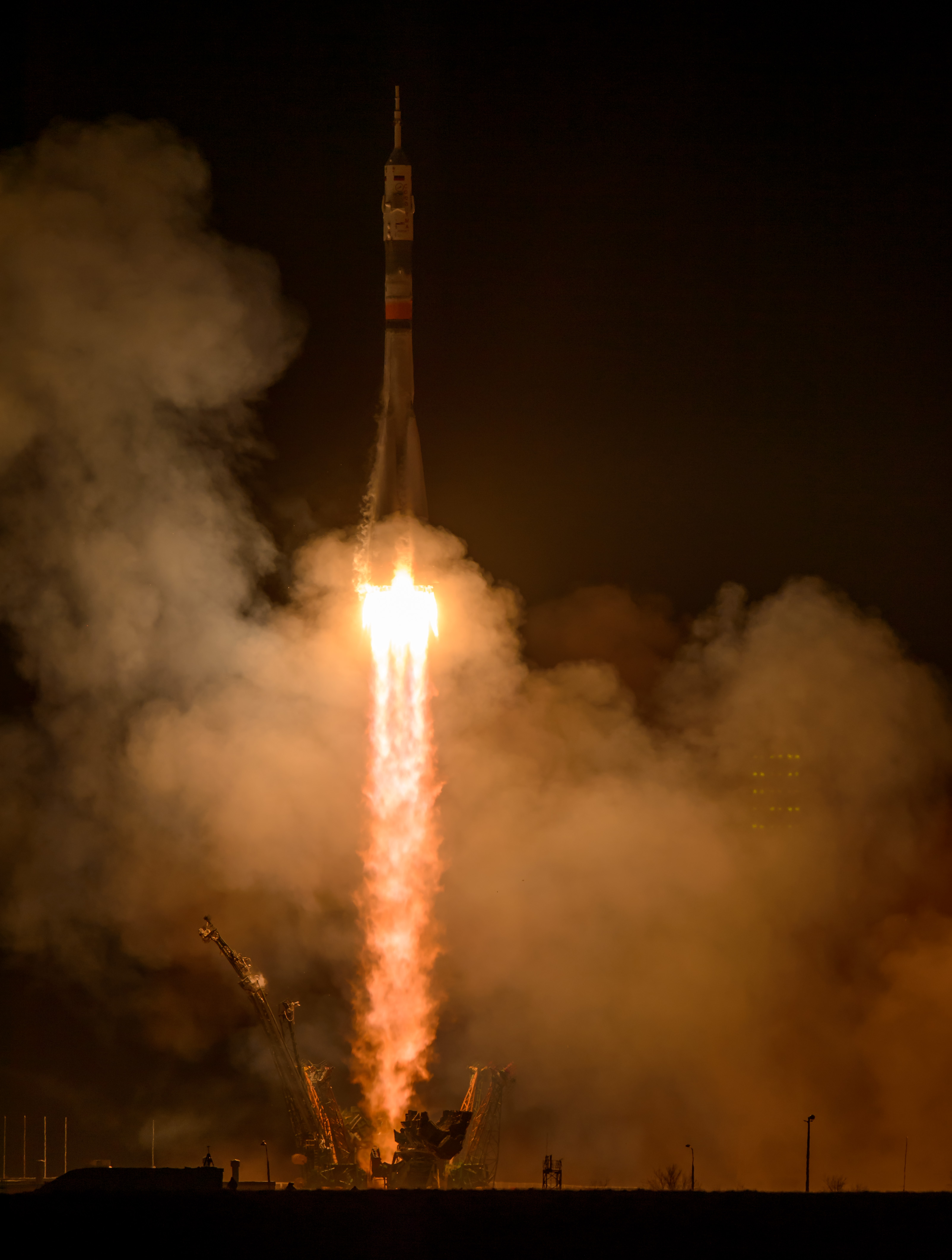
TMA-12M launches from the Baikonur Cosmodrome.

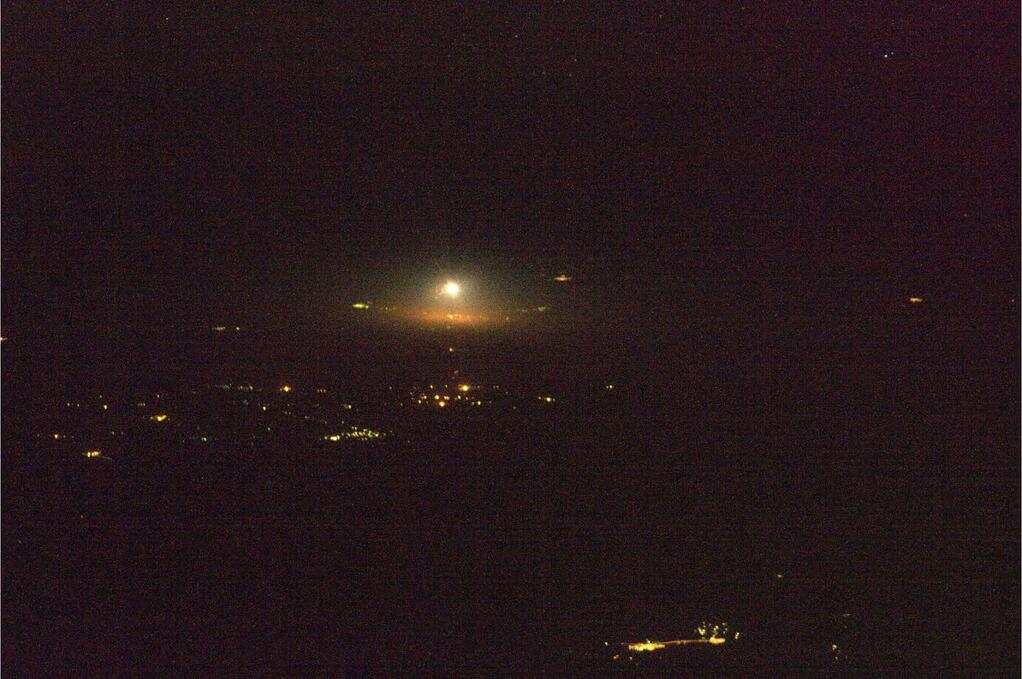
TMA-12M launch as seen from the ISS.

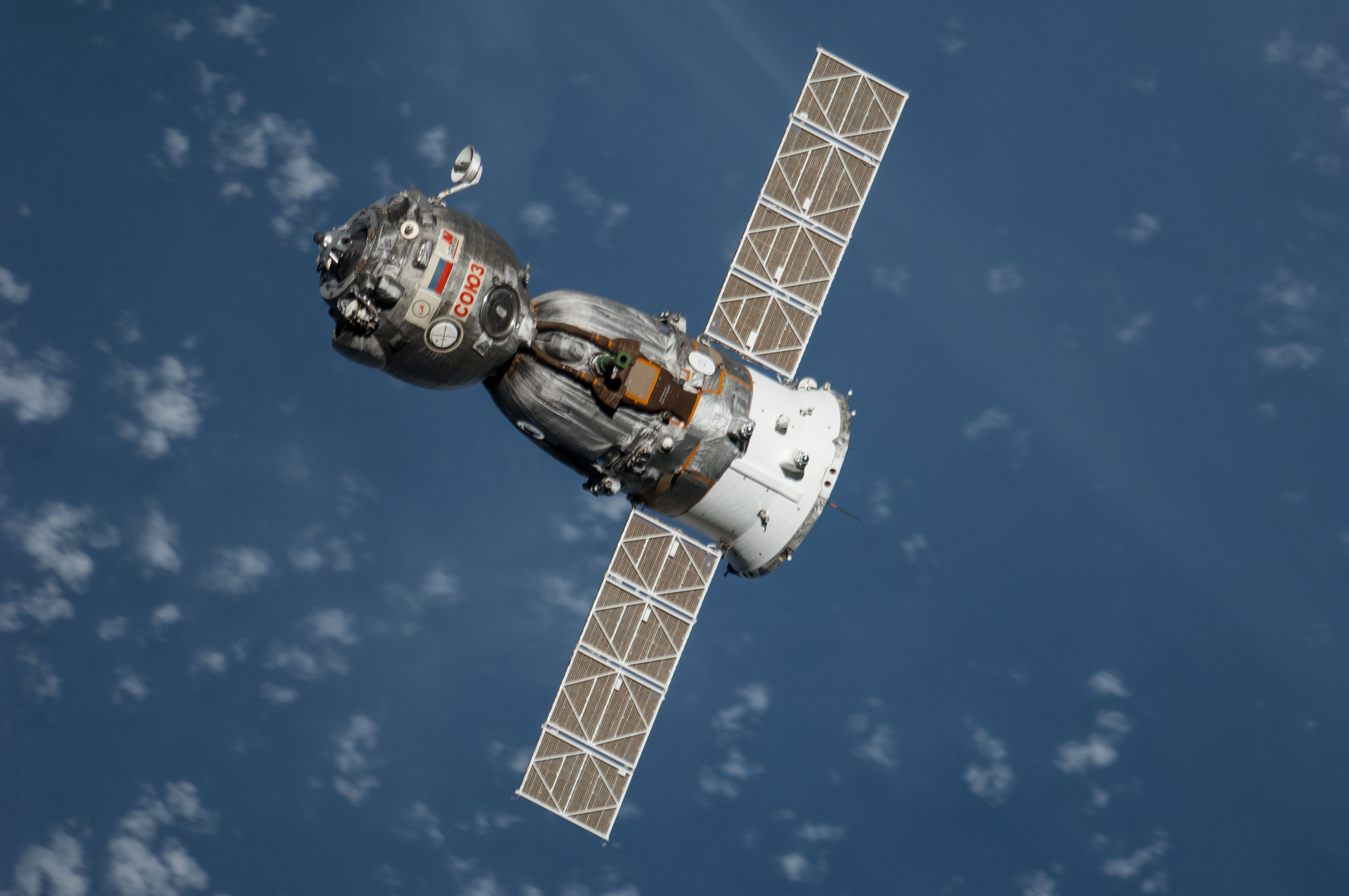
TMA-12M departing the ISS.

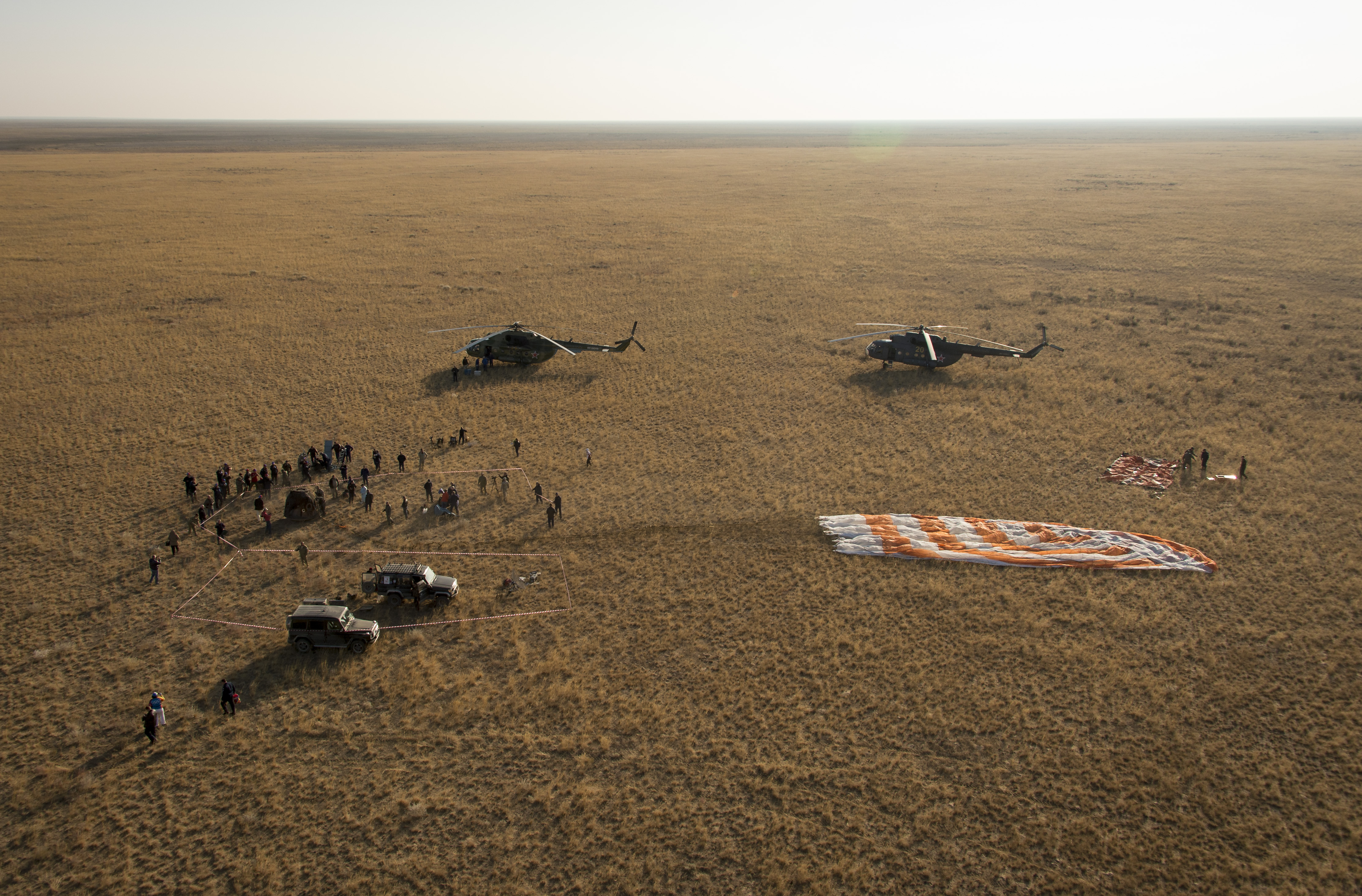
TMA-12M post-landing crew recovery.
