= Expedition 41 =

Trip to the International Space Station

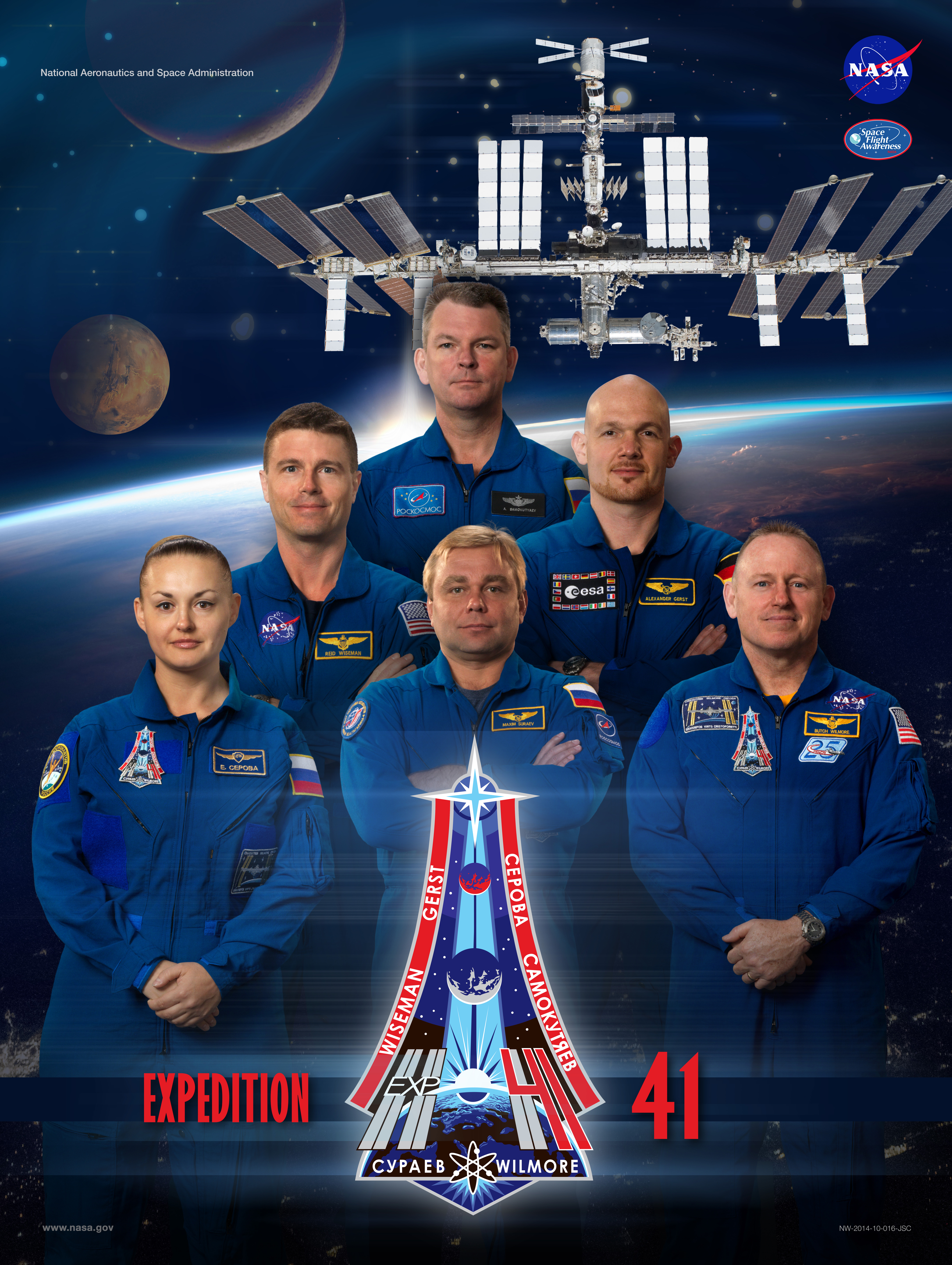
- Promotional Poster
- Mission type: Long-duration expedition

Expedition
- Space station: International Space Station
- Began: 10 September 2014 UTC
- Ended: 10 November 2014 UTC
- Arrived aboard: Soyuz TMA-13M; Soyuz TMA-14M
- Departed aboard: Soyuz TMA-13M; Soyuz TMA-14M

Crew
- Crew size: 6
- Members: Expedition 40/41: Maksim Surayev; Reid Wiseman; Alexander Gerst Expedition 41/42: Aleksandr Samokutyayev; Yelena Serova; Barry E. Wilmore
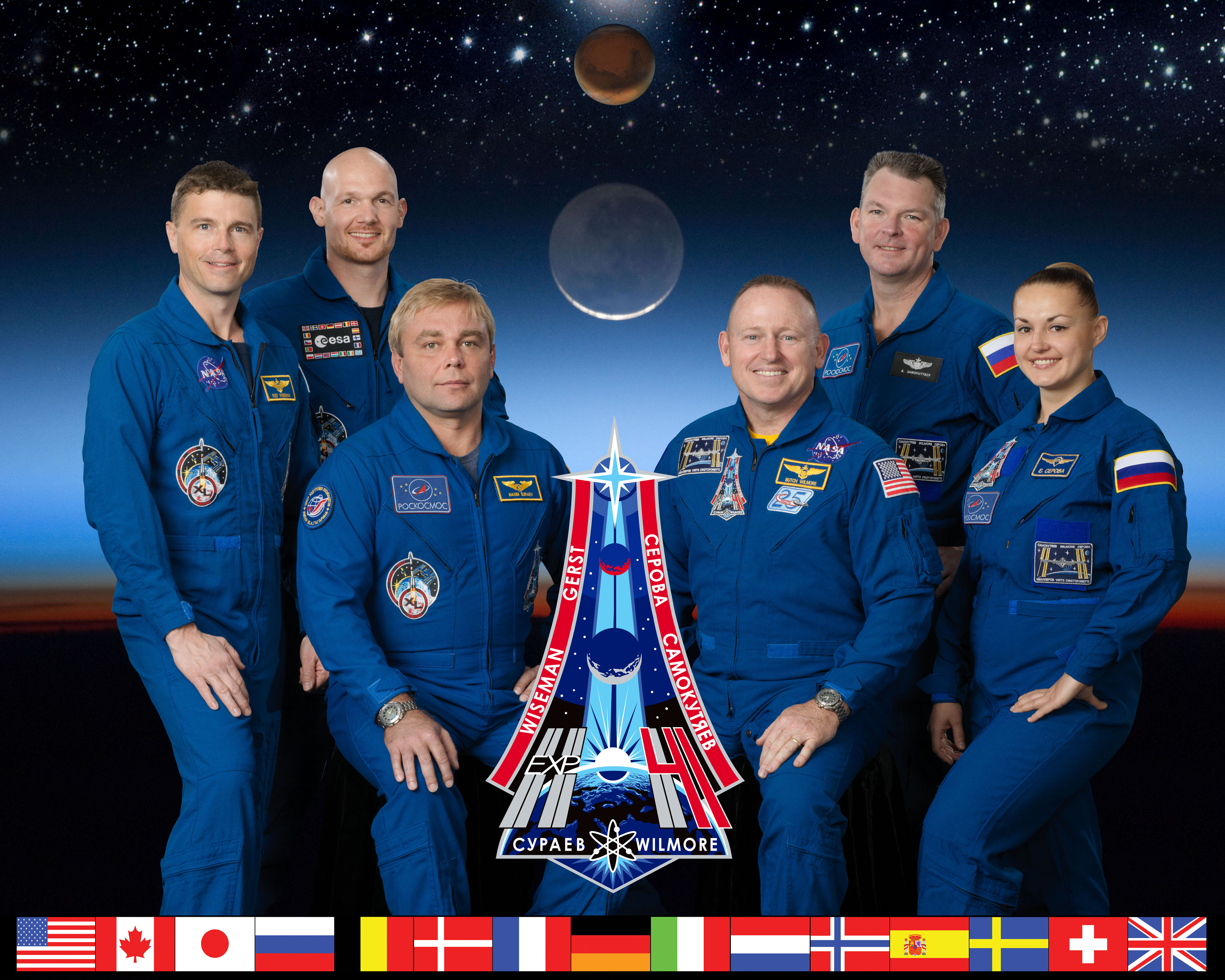
- Expedition 41 mission patch (l-r) Wiseman, Gerst, Surayev, Wilmore, Samokutyayev and Serova ISS expeditions

Expedition 41 was the 41st expedition to the International Space Station. It began on 10 September 2014 with the undocking of Soyuz TMA-12M, returning the crew of Expedition 40 to Earth.

The expedition ended with the undocking of Soyuz TMA-13M on November 10, 2014. The remainder of Expedition 41's crew joined Expedition 42.

== Crew ==
Position	First Part (September 2014)	Second Part (September 2014 to November 2014)
Commander	Maksim Surayev, RSA; Second and last spaceflight	
Flight Engineer 1	Reid Wiseman, NASA; First spaceflight	
Flight Engineer 2	Alexander Gerst, ESA; First spaceflight	
Flight Engineer 3	—N/a	Aleksandr Samokutyayev, RSA; Second and last spaceflight
Flight Engineer 4	—N/a	Yelena Serova, RSA; Only spaceflight
Flight Engineer 5	—N/a	Barry E. Wilmore, NASA; Second spaceflight

Source
ESA
