= Expedition 40 =

Long-duration mission to the International Space Station

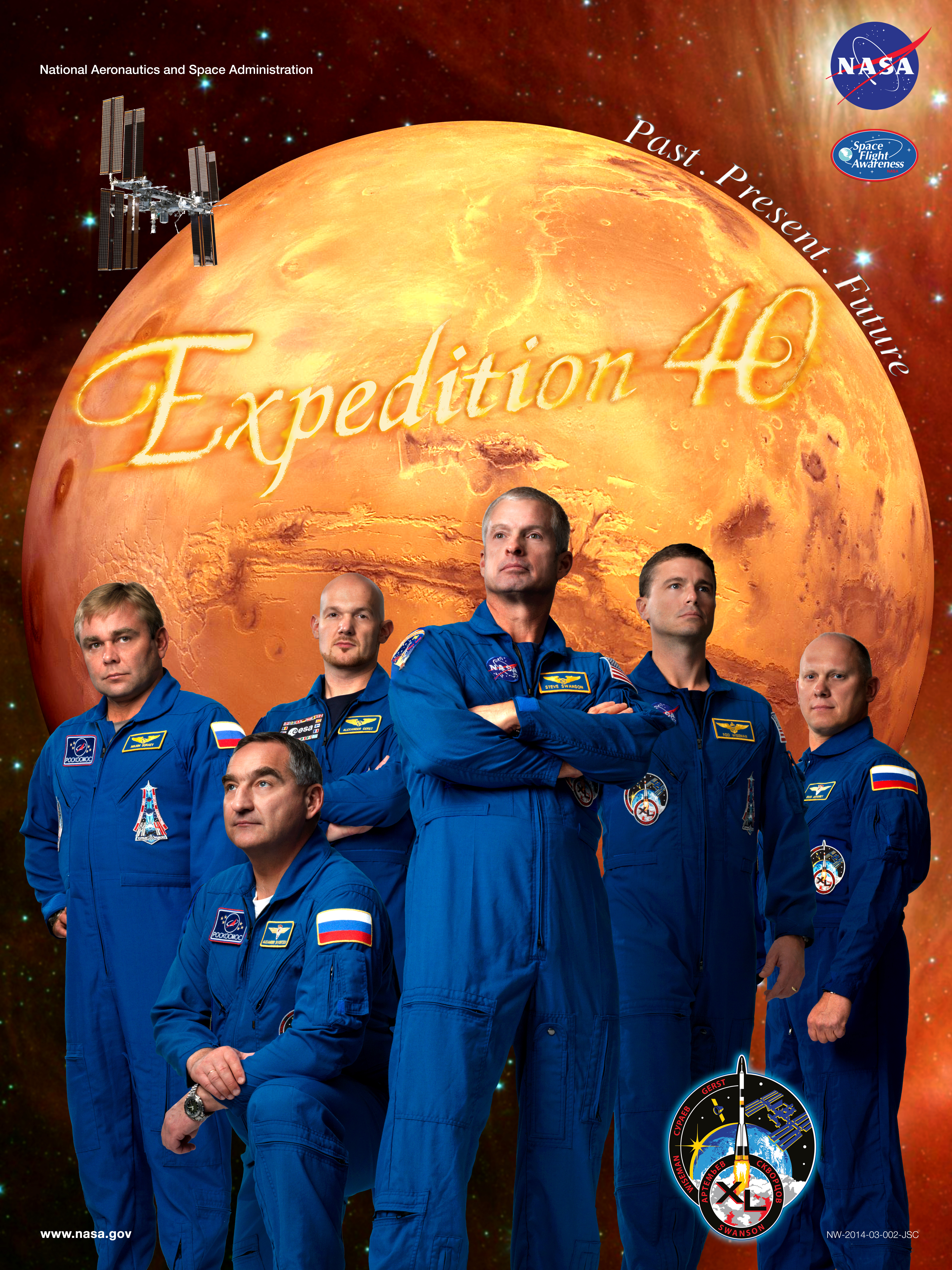
- Promotional Poster
- Mission type: Long-duration expedition

Expedition
- Space station: International Space Station
- Began: 13 May 2014 UTC
- Ended: 10 September 2014 UTC
- Arrived aboard: Soyuz TMA-12M; Soyuz TMA-13M
- Departed aboard: Soyuz TMA-12M; Soyuz TMA-13M

Crew
- Crew size: 6
- Members: Expedition 39/40: Steven R. Swanson; Aleksandr Skvortsov; Oleg Artemyev Expedition 40/41: Reid Wiseman; Maksim Surayev; Alexander Gerst
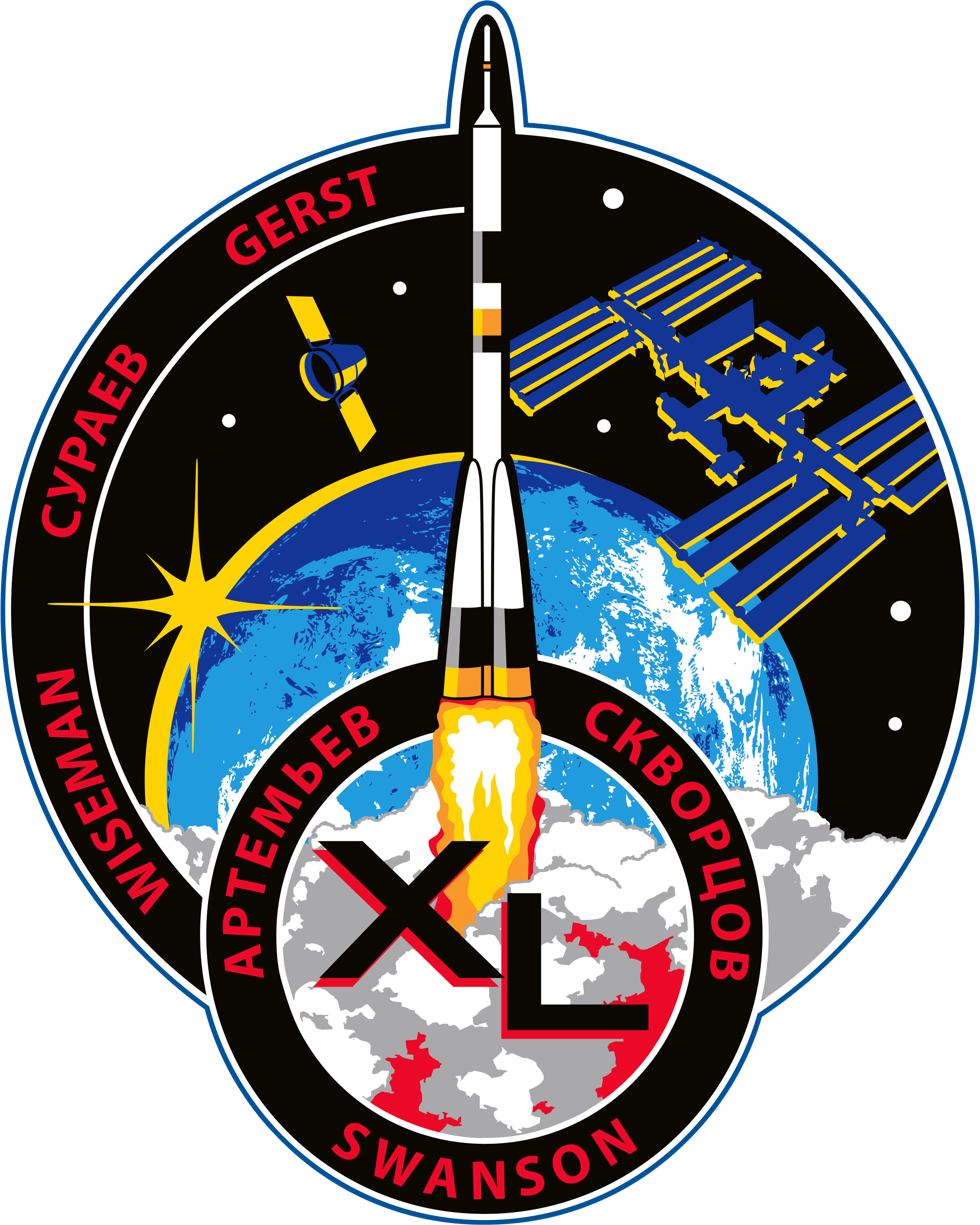
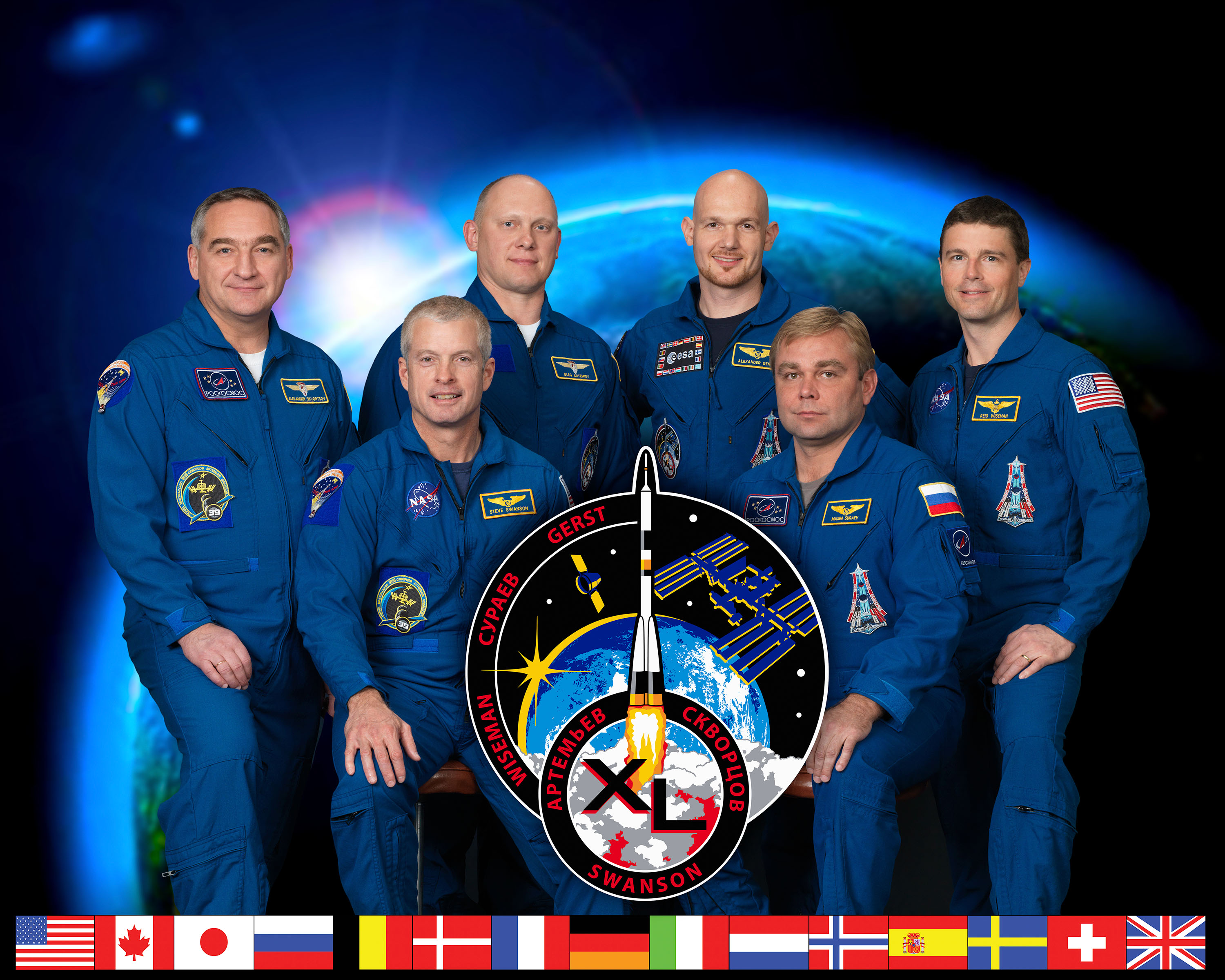
- Expedition 40 mission patch (l-r) Skvortsov, Swanson, Artemyev, Gerst, Surayev and Wiseman ISS expeditions

Expedition 40 was the 40th expedition to the International Space Station. A portion of the Expedition 39 crew transferred to Expedition 40 while the remainder of the crew launched on May 28, 2014 from Baikonur Cosmodrome in Kazakhstan.

Upon achieving orbit approximately nine minutes after launch, Soyuz TMA-13M, delivering the remainder of the crew, began a four-orbit rendezvous with the International Space Station. Soyuz TMA-13M subsequently docked with the Rassvet module of the ISS at 1:44 UTC on May 29. Hatches were opened between the two spacecraft just over two hours later at 3:52 UTC. The expedition ended with the undocking of Soyuz TMA-12M on September 10, 2014. The remainder of Expedition 40's crew joined Expedition 41.

== Crew ==
Position	First Part (May 2014)	Second Part (May 2014 to September 2014)
Commander	Steven R. Swanson, NASA; Third and last spaceflight	
Flight Engineer 1	Aleksandr Skvortsov, RSA; Second spaceflight	
Flight Engineer 2	Oleg Artemyev, RSA; First spaceflight	
Flight Engineer 3		Maksim Surayev, RSA; Second and last spaceflight
Flight Engineer 4		Reid Wiseman, NASA; First spaceflight
Flight Engineer 5		Alexander Gerst, ESA; First spaceflight

Source
ESA

== Mobile Servicing System ==
The Mobile Servicing System is a robotic system onboard the ISS used for assembly and maintenance. During Expedition 40, it was used to replace a broken camera on the system's mobile base with a deteriorated but functional camera from the arm, and to in turn place a new camera on the arm. This marked the first self-repair by a robot in space, and is likely to result in reduced need for time consuming and dangerous space walks.

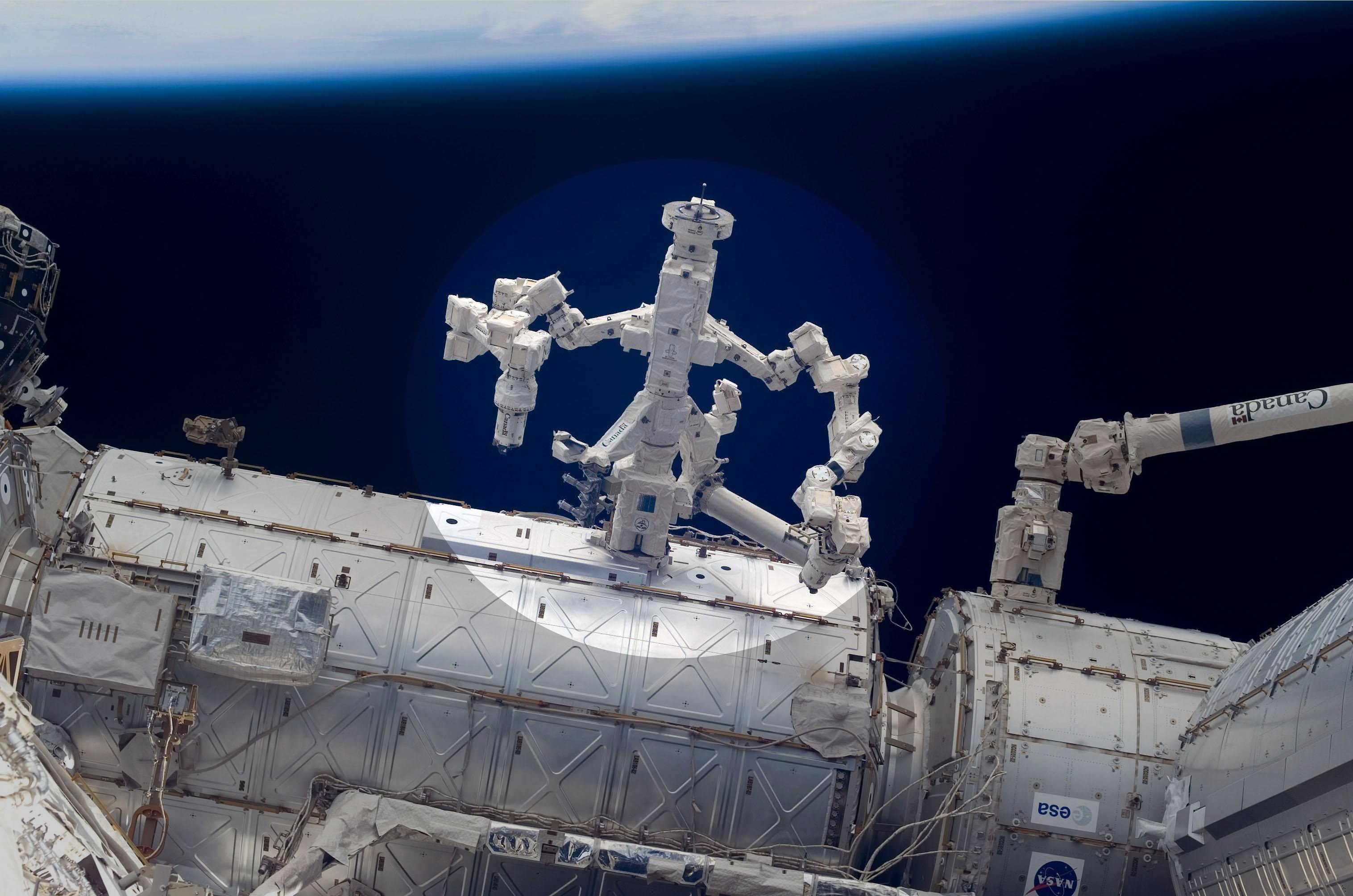
Dextre and Canadarm2 docked side by side on Power Data Grapple Fixtures
