= Mark Serov =

Russian cosmonaut (born 1974)

Mark Viacheslavovich Serov
- Born: 10 June 1984 (age 42); Penza, Penza Oblast, RSFSR
- Occupation: Test cosmonaut (ret.)
- Space career

Cosmonaut
- Previous occupation: Engineer
- Status: Retired
- Selection: RKKE-15 Cosmonaut Group

Mark Viacheslavovich Serov (Russian: Марк Вячеславович Серов; born May 23, 1974, in Penza, Penza Oblast, RSFSR) is a retired Russian cosmonaut first selected in 2003.

== Biography ==
On June 16, 2003, Serov began training as a cosmonaut. He was appointed as a test cosmonaut on July 5, 2005; however, on November 9, 2010, he was removed from flight status for medical reasons. Serov continued working with RSC Energia in a number of roles. In 2012, he participated in the committee that selected the 2012 cosmonaut group and served as the deputy director of the 291st department of RSC Energia. Subsequently, he was named deputy head of the Scientific and Technical Center in June 2018. Serov left the cosmonaut corps and began working at S7 Space on February 19, 2019.

He is married to Yelena Serova, also a cosmonaut and current politician who is a former resident of the International Space Station. They have one daughter.
