= Steven Swanson =

American engineer and NASA astronaut (born 1960)

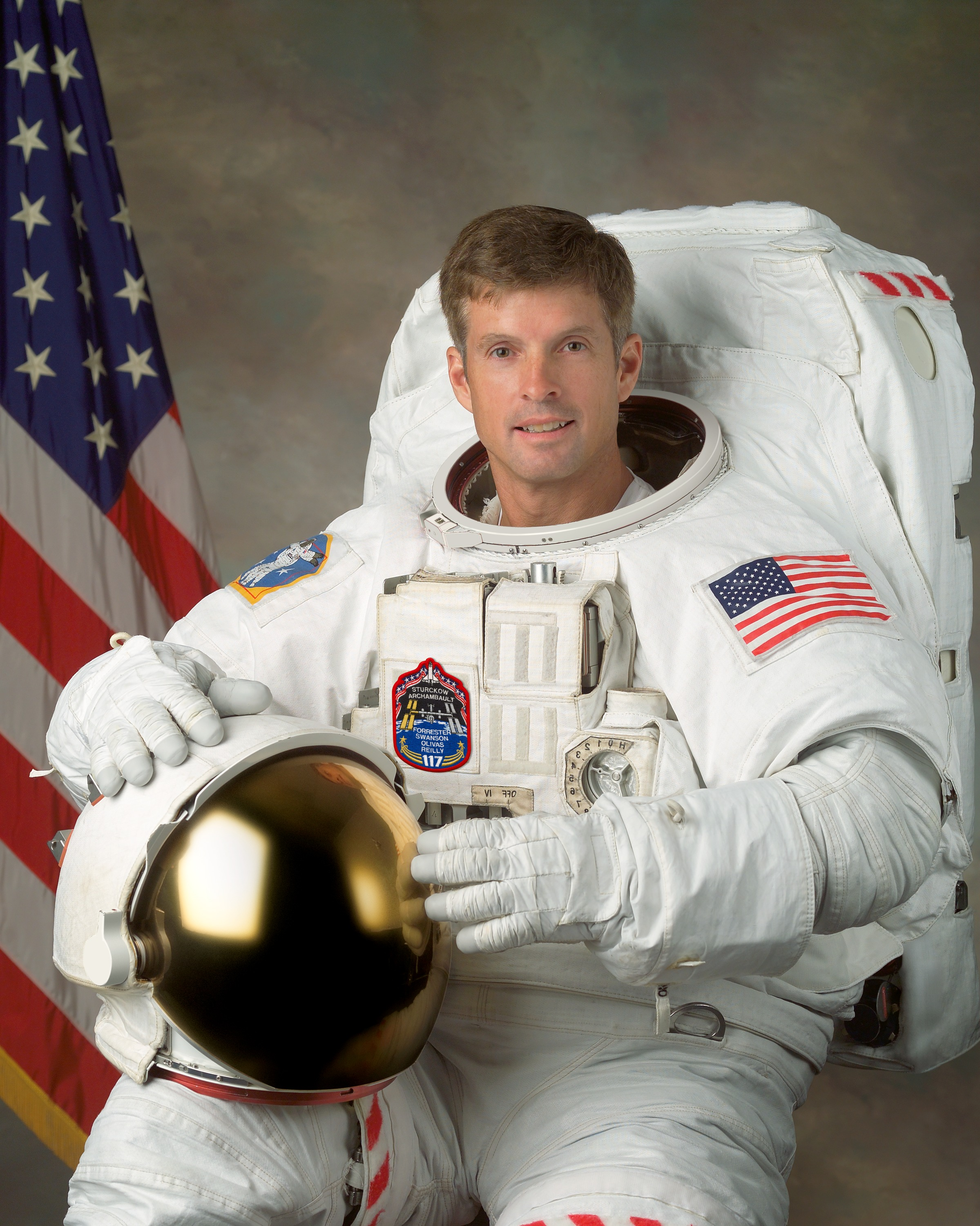
- Swanson in September 2006
- Born: Steven Ray Swanson; December 3, 1960 (age 65); Syracuse, New York, U.S.
- Education: University of Colorado Boulder (BS); Florida Atlantic University (MS); Texas A&M University (PhD)
- Space career

NASA astronaut
- Time in space: 195 days, 20 hours, 45 minutes
- Selection: NASA Group 17 (1998)
- Total EVAs: 5
- Total EVA time: 27 hours, 58 minutes
- Missions: STS-117; STS-119; Soyuz TMA-12M (Expedition 39/40)
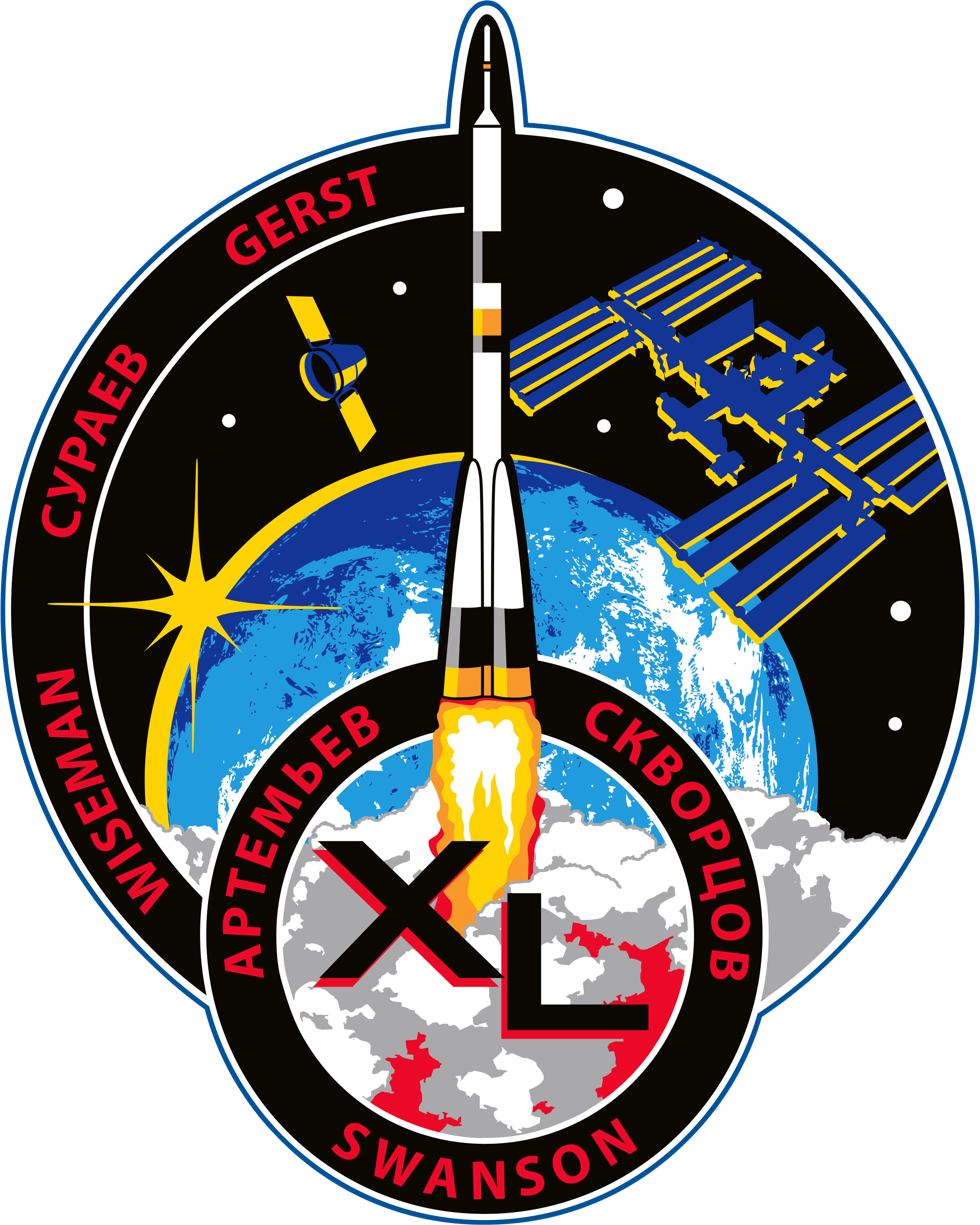
- Mission insignia
- Scientific career
- Fields: Computer science
- Thesis: A Method and Implementation for Incorporating Heuristic Knowledge into a State Estimator through the Use of a Fuzzy Model (1998)
- Website: Official website

Steven Roy Swanson (born December 3, 1960, in Syracuse, New York) is an American engineer and retired NASA astronaut. Swanson has flown two shuttle flights, STS-117 and STS-119, and one Soyuz flight, TMA-12M. All of the flights were to the International Space Station. He has logged over 195 days in space and completed five spacewalks totaling 27 hours and 58 minutes. Swanson has served in other roles at NASA, such as a CAPCOM for both International Space Station and Space Shuttle missions. His awards and honors include the NASA Exceptional Achievement Medal and the JSC Certificate of Accommodation. Prior to becoming a NASA astronaut, Swanson worked for GTE in Phoenix, Arizona, as a software engineer. He is married and has three children. Steve claims he had the first ever Instagram posted from space.

== Early life ==
Although born in Syracuse, New York, Swanson considers Steamboat Springs, Colorado, to be his home. He graduated from Steamboat Springs High School in 1979, and went on to the University of Colorado Boulder to receive a bachelor's degree in engineering physics in 1983. In 1986, he received a master of applied science in computer systems from Florida Atlantic University. He later received a doctorate in computer science from Texas A&M University in 1998.

== NASA career ==
Swanson joined NASA in 1987 as a systems engineer and a flight engineer working on the Shuttle Training Aircraft. He was selected as an astronaut in May 1998. His first mission was STS-117, which launched June 2007. Swanson was a mission specialist and flight engineer on this flight. He served as a mission specialist and lead spacewalker on STS-119, which launched March 15, 2009, and landed on March 28. He launched to the International Space Station as a member of Expedition 39/40 on March 25, 2014, from the Baikonur Cosmodrome in Kazakhstan and returned to Earth on September 11, 2014. NASA announced Swanson's retirement in August 2015. Since then he has worked at Boise State University as a distinguished educator in residence assisting with programs such as the NASA Spacesuit User Interface Technologies for Students program.

Steven Swanson is a Browncoat, or fan of Joss Whedon's Serenity and Firefly. He added copies of the movie and box set of the TV series to the ISS Movie Library on STS-117 in June 2007.

| Preceded by Koichi Wakata | ISS Expedition Commander; 13 May 2014 to 10 September 2014 | Succeeded by Maksim Surayev |
