= Yelena Serova =

Russian cosmonaut and politician (born 1976)

- Елена Серова
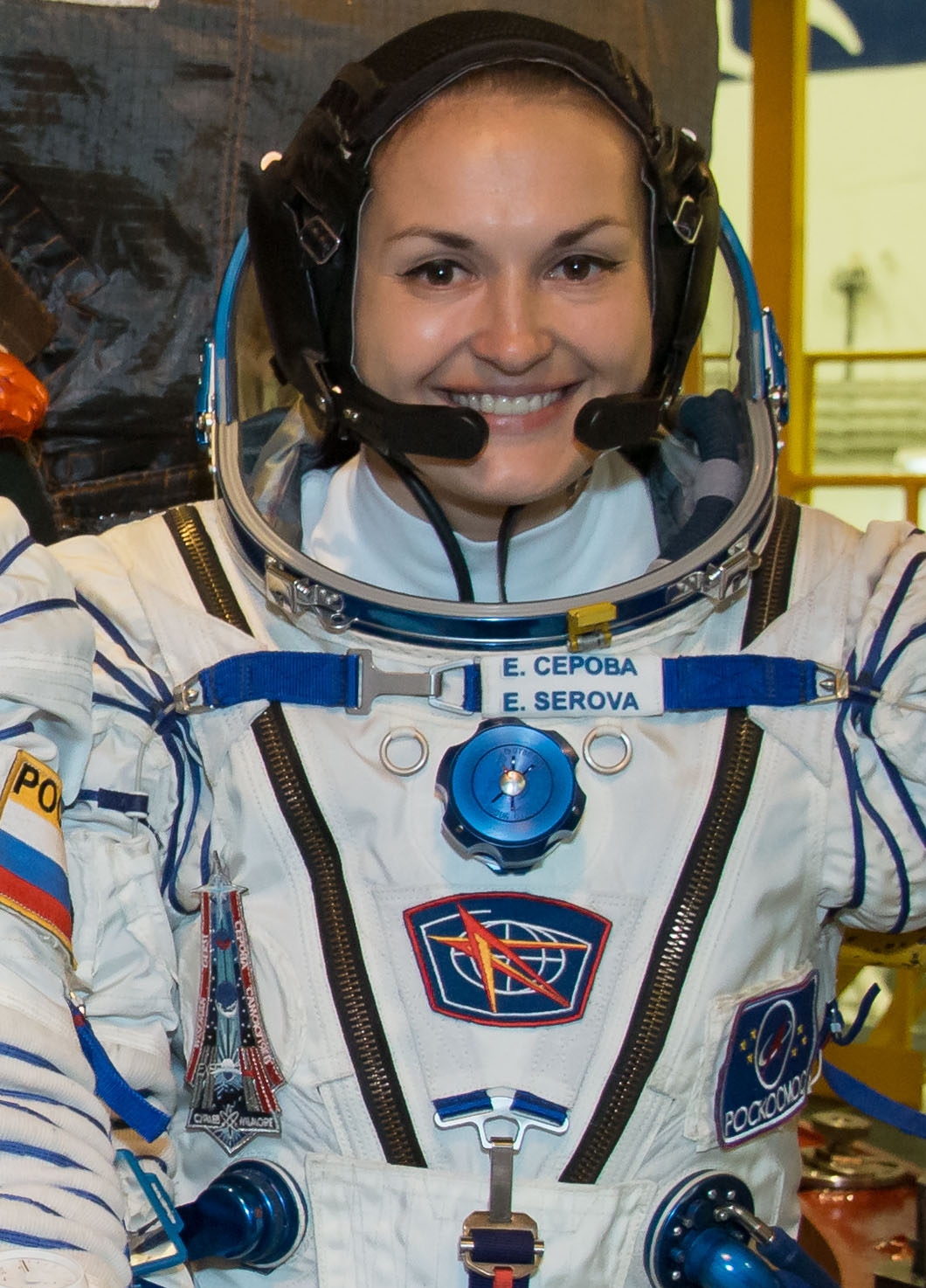
- Serova in 2014 in front of Soyuz TMA-14M

Member of the State Duma for Moscow Oblast
- In office 5 October 2016 – 12 October 2021
- Preceded by: constituency re-established
- Succeeded by: Nikita Chaplin
- Constituency: Kolomna (No. 119)

Personal details
- Born: Yelena Olegovna Kuznetsova; 22 April 1976 (age 50) Vozdvizhenka, Russian SFSR, USSR
- Party: United Russia
- Spouse: Mark Serov
- Children: 1 (daughter)
- Education: Moscow Aviation Institute
- Occupation: Politician; Engineer
- Space career

Roscosmos cosmonaut
- Time in space: 167d 05h 42m
- Selection: 2006 RKKE group
- Missions: Soyuz TMA-14M (Expedition 41/42)
- Mission insignia
- Retired: 23 September 2016

Yelena Olegovna Serova (Russian: Елена Олеговна Серова; née Kuznetsova [Кузнецова]; born 22 April 1976) is a Russian politician and former cosmonaut. She served as a Deputy in the State Duma of Russian Federation between 2016 and 2021.

Before her political career she was a Roscosmos cosmonaut, selected in 2006. She flew one long duration mission to the International Space Station from 2014 to 2015 before retiring from the cosmonaut corps in 2016.

== Biography ==
Yelena Serova was born Yelena Olegovna Kuznetsova in Vozdvizhenka, a village which is part of the city of Ussuriysk in the far east in Russia. She stayed in Vozdvizhenka until 1988. Serova went to Germany since her father who was with the military received a transfer. Afterwards, she came to Moscow. She met her future husband Mark at the Moscow Aviation Institute.

In March 2001, Serova graduated from the Aerospace Faculty of the Moscow Aviation Institute qualified as an engineer. In 2003 she graduated from the Moscow State Academy of Instrument Engineering and Information qualified as an economist.

Prior to enrollment as a cosmonaut, Serova had worked as an engineer of the 2nd category for the RSC Energia, and in the Mission Control Center.

Serova was selected as a test cosmonaut at the age of 30 in the RKKE-14 group in October 2006 while working as a flight engineer. She completed basic training at Star City in 2009.

=== Expedition 41/42 ===
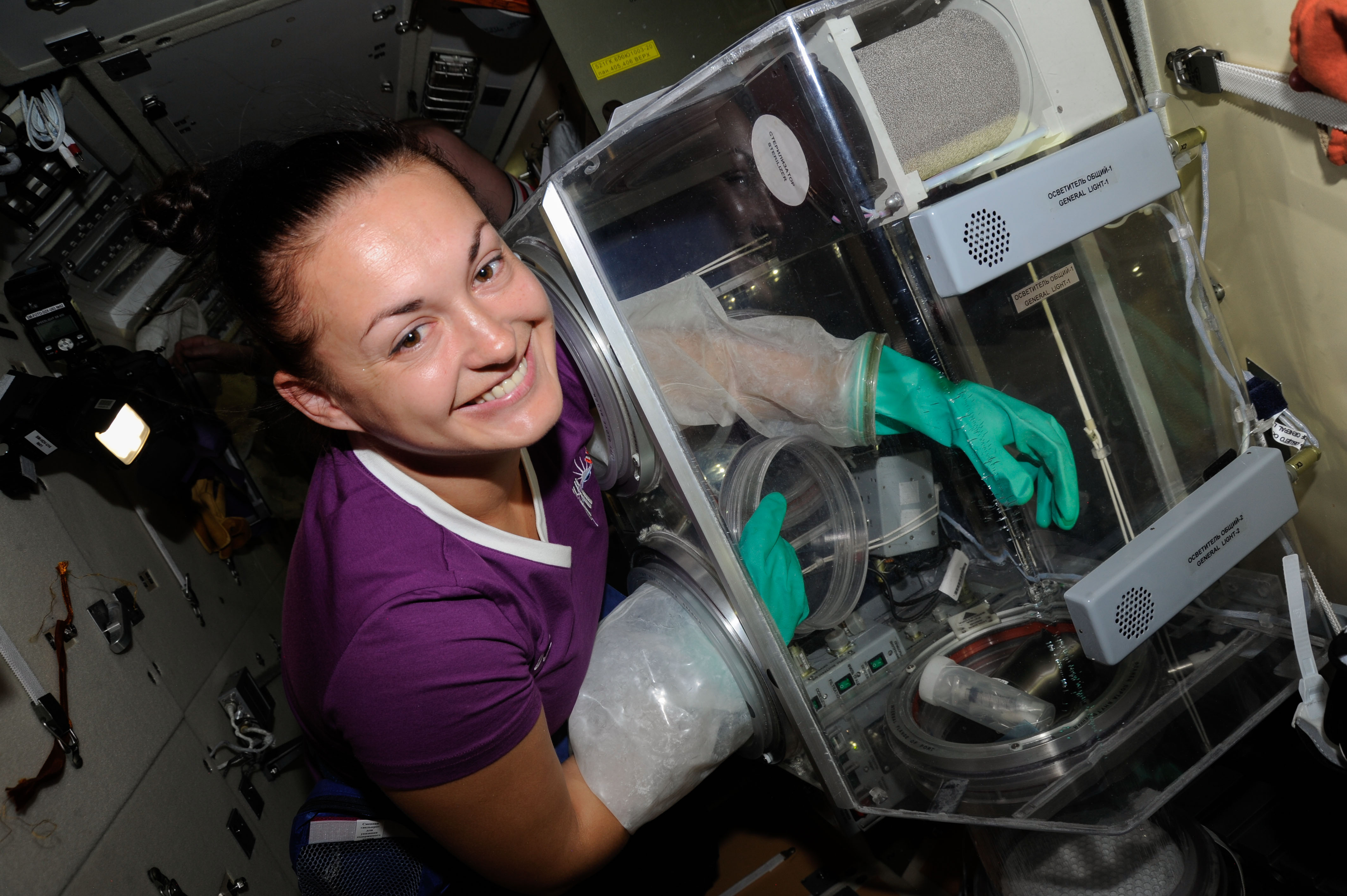
Serova works with test samples from the Kaskad cell cultivation experiment in the MRM2.

In late 2011, Russian Space Agency Chief Vladimir Popovkin announced that Serova would fly to the International Space Station, expected to spend up to six months in space performing biophysics and medical experiments. On 25 September 2014, she traveled aboard Soyuz TMA-14M spacecraft to serve as a flight engineer for Expedition 41/42.

Serova is the fourth female cosmonaut to travel to space. The three previous female cosmonauts were Valentina Tereshkova (1963), Svetlana Savitskaya (1982 and 1984), and Yelena Kondakova (1994 and 1997). They represented the former Soviet Union and Russia.

The Soyuz FG rocket carrying TMA-14M commander Aleksandr Samokutyayev, Yelena Serova and NASA astronaut Barry Wilmore blasted off from the Baikonur Cosmodrome's Site 1/5 at 20:25 UTC. Nine minutes after launch, the Soyuz TMA-14M spacecraft separated from the third stage of the FG rocket to reach orbit. Soon after, the spacecraft deployed its KURS navigation antennas, however, only one of the two power-generating solar arrays successfully unfolded. Despite the trouble encountered, TMA-14M linked up with the Space Station four orbits and six hours later at 1:12 UTC on 26 September. When leak checks were complete, the hatch on the Poisk module was opened at 5:06 UTC and Serova with Samokutyayev and Wilmore entered the Space Station. On 11 March 2015, the crew successfully returned to Earth after 167 days in space.

== Politics ==
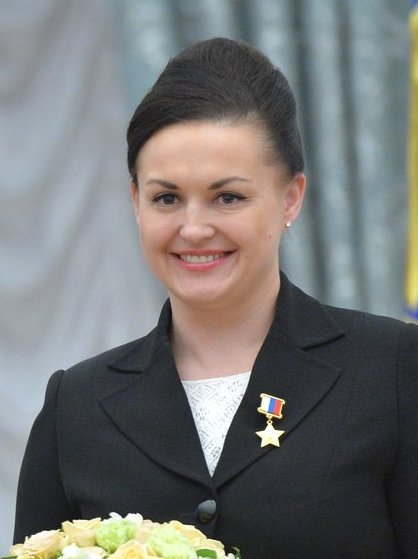
Serova in 2016

In 2016, she was elected to the State Duma from the United Russia party and left the cosmonaut squad. Speaking at the plenary meeting of the Parliamentary Assembly of the Organization for Security and Co-operation in Europe on 8 July 2019, she stated that "On the board of the International Space Station, [she and other astronauts] had a chance to see with naked eyes how bombs and shells exploded in Donbass and Luhansk. And they flew from the location of the Armed Forces of Ukraine. Meanwhile, unarmed people died there." According to cosmonaut Yuri Baturin, such military operations are unlikely to be visible without special surveillance tools from the ISS. The altitude of the ISS above the ground ranges from 411.5 to 430.3 kilometers.

In July 2017 Serova was a vice chairperson at a meeting to discuss a bill on the protection of animals.

== Personal life ==
Serova is married to cosmonaut Mark Serov, selected in RKKE-13 in 2003, but retired before flying any missions. They have a daughter. Serova was one of five cosmonauts selected to raise the Russian flag at the 2014 Winter Olympics opening ceremony in Sochi. Her interests include flying and economics.

== See also ==
- List of female Heroes of the Russian Federation
- List of female spacefarers
