= Soyuz TMA-13M =

2014 Russian crewed spaceflight to the ISS

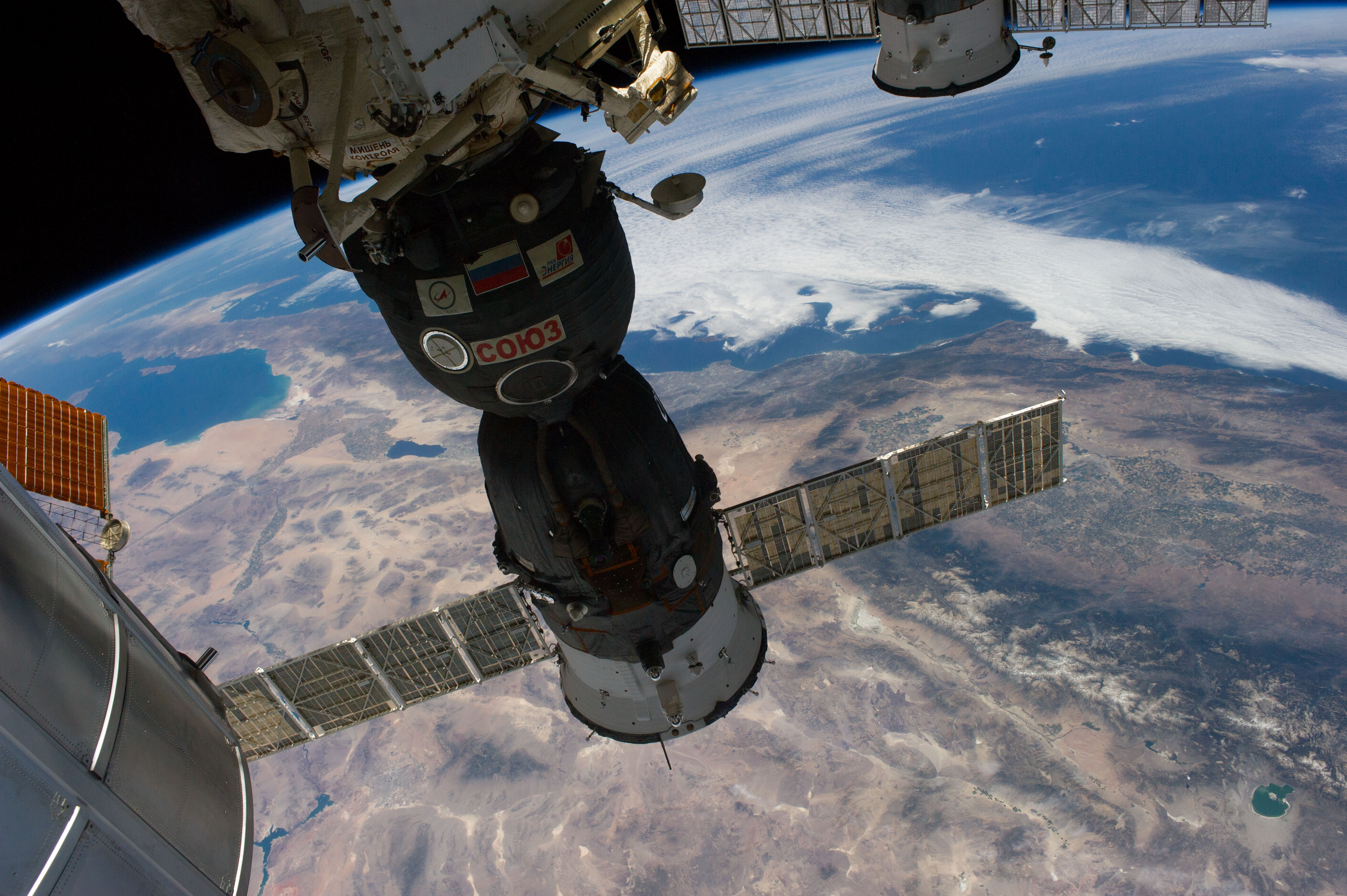
- Soyuz TMA-13M docked to the ISS, flying above California and Nevada.
- Operator: Roscosmos
- COSPAR ID: 2014-031A
- SATCAT no.: 39775
- Mission duration: 165 days, 8 hours, 1 minute

Spacecraft properties
- Spacecraft: Soyuz 11F732A47 No.713
- Spacecraft type: Soyuz-TMA 11F747
- Manufacturer: Energia
- Launch mass: 305,000 Kilograms

Crew
- Crew size: 3
- Members: Maksim Surayev; Reid Wiseman; Alexander Gerst
- Callsign: Cepheus

Start of mission
- Launch date: 28 May 2014, 19:57:41 UTC
- Rocket: Soyuz-FG
- Launch site: Baikonur 1/5

End of mission
- Landing date: 10 November 2014, 03:58 UTC
- Landing site: Kazakh Steppe, Kazakhstan

Orbital parameters
- Reference system: Geocentric
- Regime: Low Earth

Docking with ISS
- Docking port: Rassvet nadir
- Docking date: 29 May 2014; 01:44 UTC
- Undocking date: 10 November 2014; 00:31 UTC
- Time docked: 164 days, 22 hours, 47 minutes
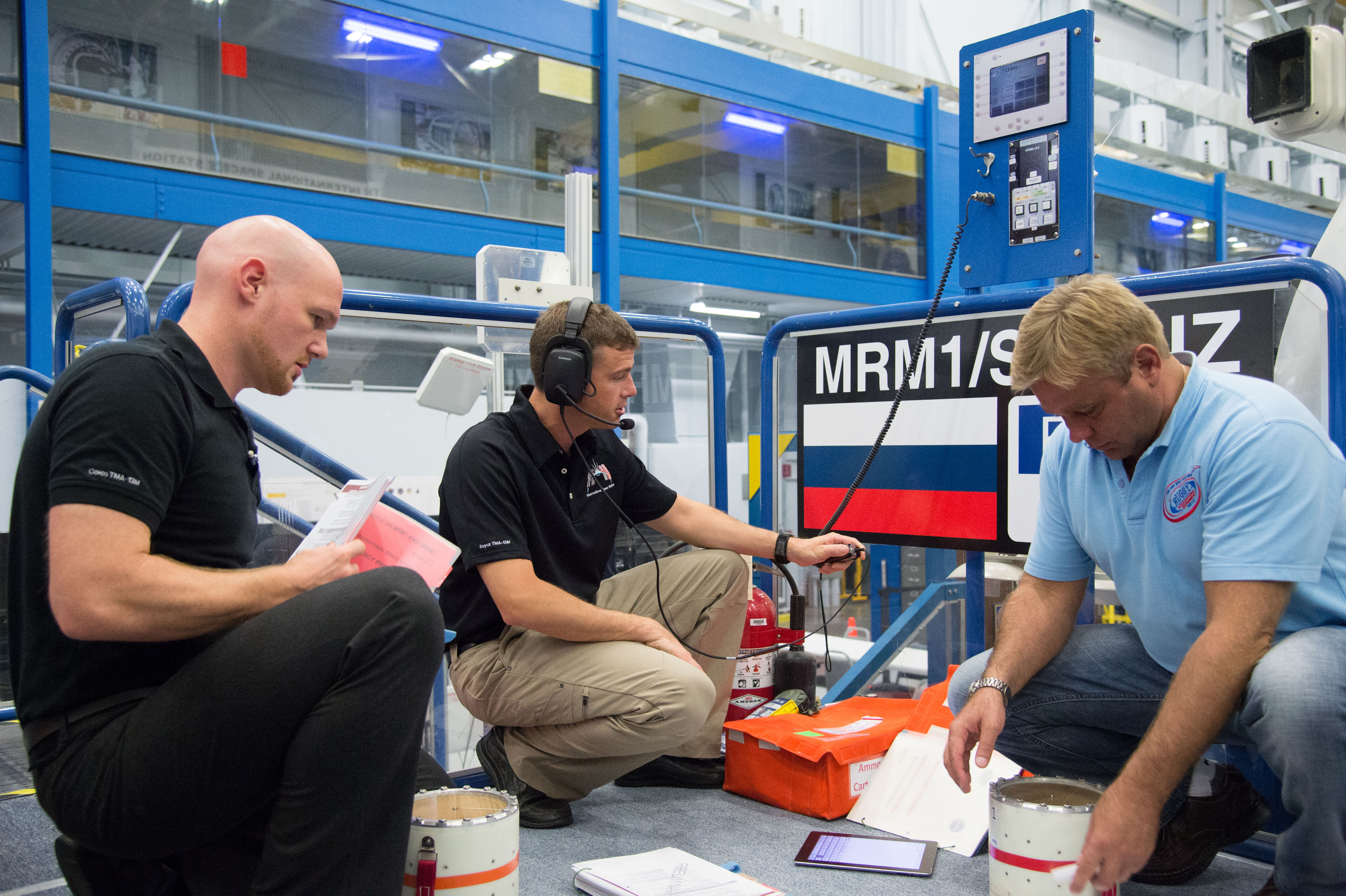
- (l-r) Gerst, Wiseman and Surayev Soyuz programme (Crewed missions)

Soyuz TMA-13M was a 2014 flight to the International Space Station. It transported three members of the Expedition 40 crew to the International Space Station. TMA-13M was the 122nd flight of a Soyuz spacecraft since 1967, and the 39th Soyuz mission to the ISS. The Soyuz remained docked to the space station for the Expedition 41 increment to serve as an emergency escape vehicle until its departure in November 2014. The European segment of the mission was called "Blue Dot".

== Crew ==
Position	Crew Member
Commander	(Russia) Maksim Surayev, Roscosmos; Expedition 40; Second and last spaceflight
Flight Engineer 1	(United States) Reid Wiseman, NASA; Expedition 40; First spaceflight
Flight Engineer 2	(Germany) Alexander Gerst, ESA; Expedition 40; First spaceflight

=== Backup crew ===
Position	Crew Member
Commander	(Russia) Anton Shkaplerov, Roscosmos
Flight Engineer 1	(Italy) Samantha Cristoforetti, ESA
Flight Engineer 2	(United States) Terry W. Virts, NASA

== Mission highlights ==
=== Rollout ===
The Soyuz FG rocket carrying the Soyuz TMA-13M spacecraft was rolled to the launch pad at Site 1/5 at the Baikonur Cosmodrome on 26 May 2014. Under sunny skies, the rollout began at 7 o'clock in the morning. The rollout was attended by the Soyuz backup crew members, Anton Shkaplerov, Samantha Cristoforetti and Terry Virts. The Soyuz TMA-13M prime crew was not at the event, since it is considered to bring bad luck. Once the 49.5-meter-tall (162 ft) Soyuz FG rocket was erected in its vertical launch position, the launcher was enclosed by its service structure, to provide protection and access platforms for workers.

=== Launch, rendezvous and docking ===
Launch of Soyuz TMA-13M occurred successfully at 19:57 UTC on May 28, 2014, from the Baikonur Cosmodrome in Kazakhstan. Upon achieving orbit approximately nine minutes after launch, TMA-13M began a four-orbit rendezvous with the International Space Station. Soyuz TMA-13M subsequently docked with the Rassvet module of the ISS at 1:44 UTC on May 29. Hatches were opened between the two spacecraft just over two hours later at 3:52 UTC.

=== Undocking and return to Earth ===
Soyuz TMA-13M undocked from the International Space Station at 00:31 UTC on November 10, 2014, with a 4-minute, 41-second deorbit burn occurring at 03:05 UTC. The spacecraft successfully landed northwest of Arkalyk, Kazakhstan at 03:58 UTC.

== Gallery ==
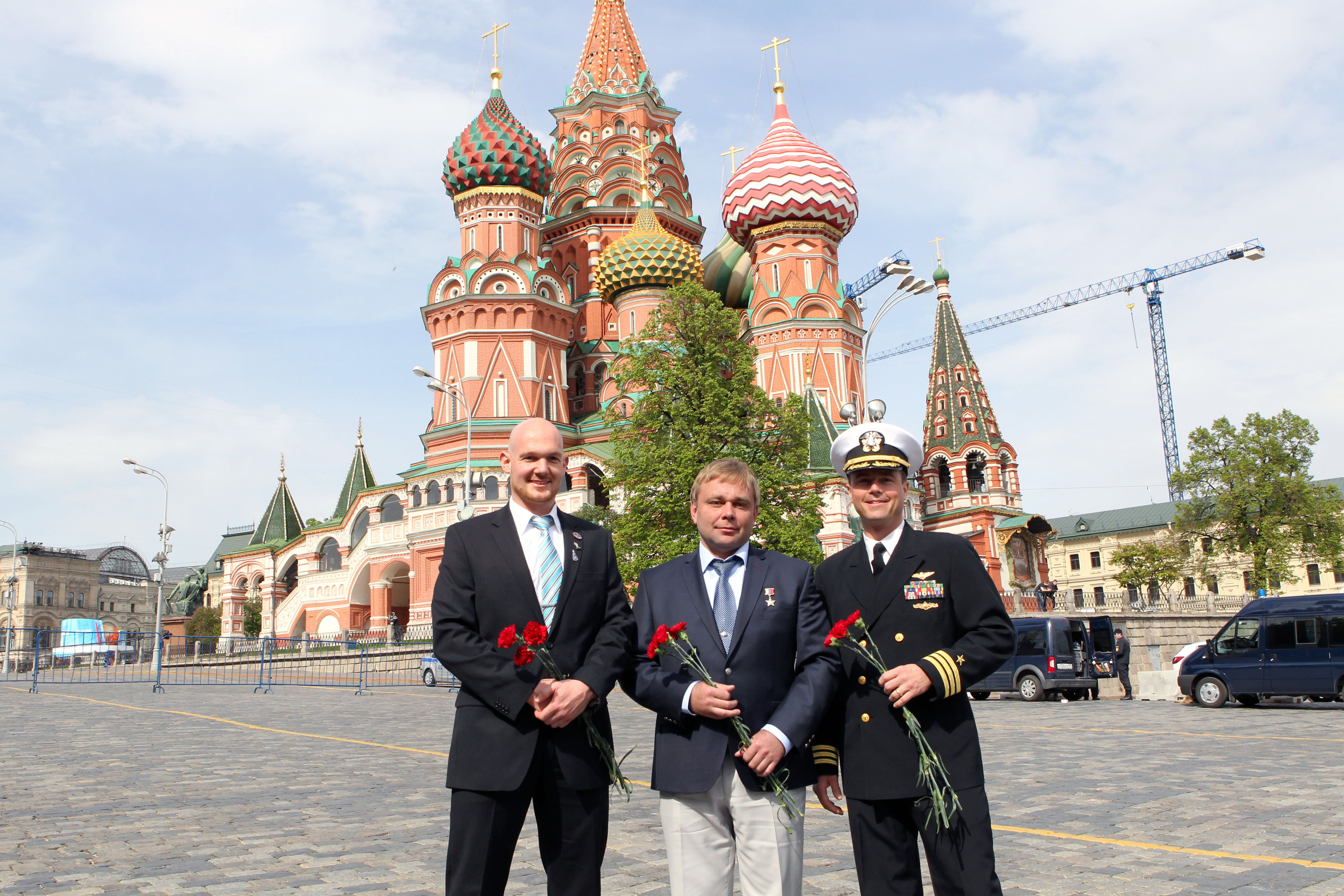
Soyuz crew in front of St. Basil's Cathedral in Moscow's Red Square

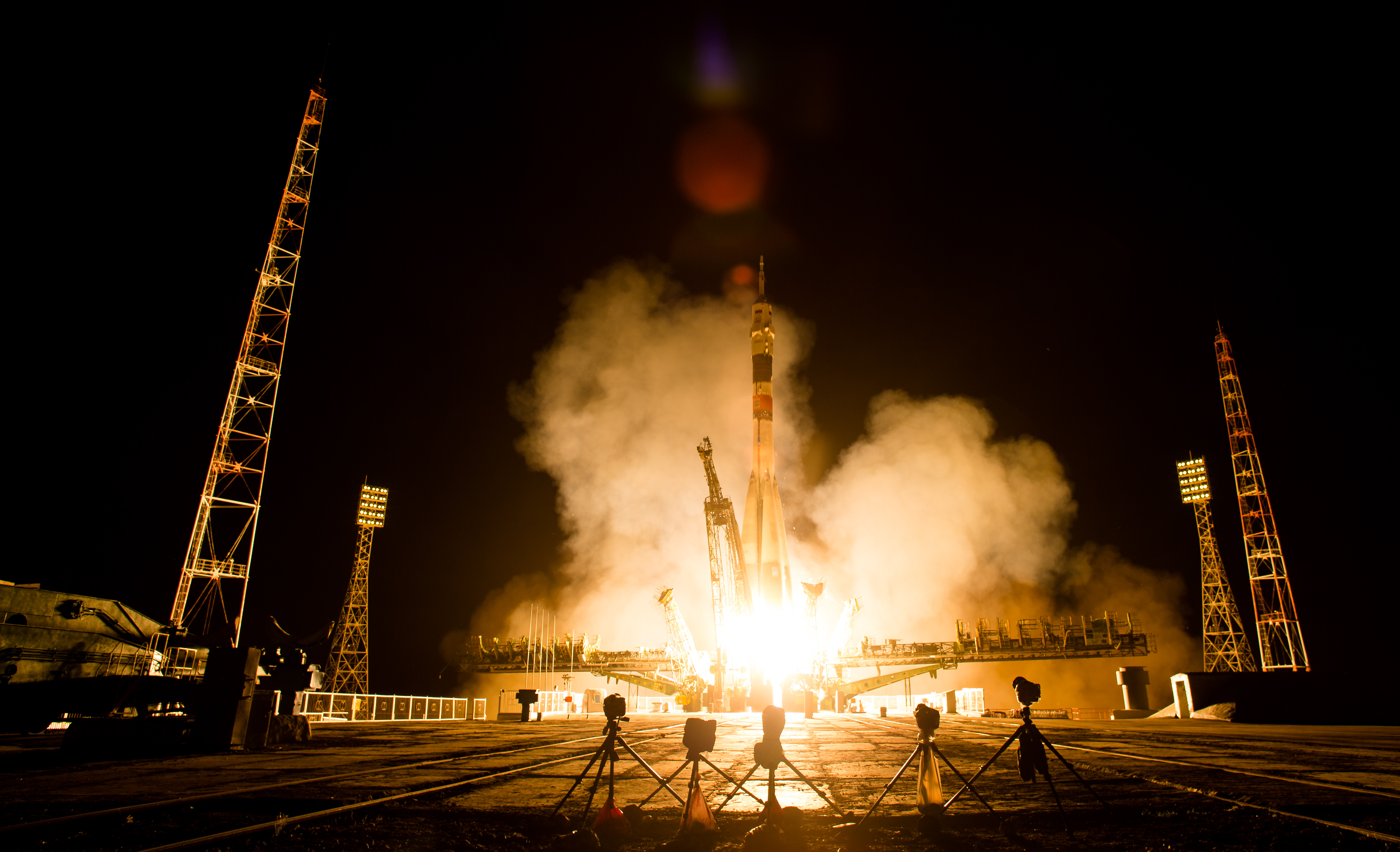
TMA-13M launches from the Baikonur Cosmodrome

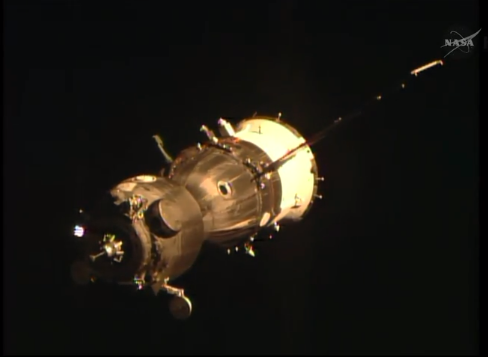
Soyuz TMA-13M spacecraft on 5-28-14 at a distance of 25m on final approach, astronaut's hand can be seen in the window.
