= STS-119 =

2009 American crewed spaceflight to the ISS

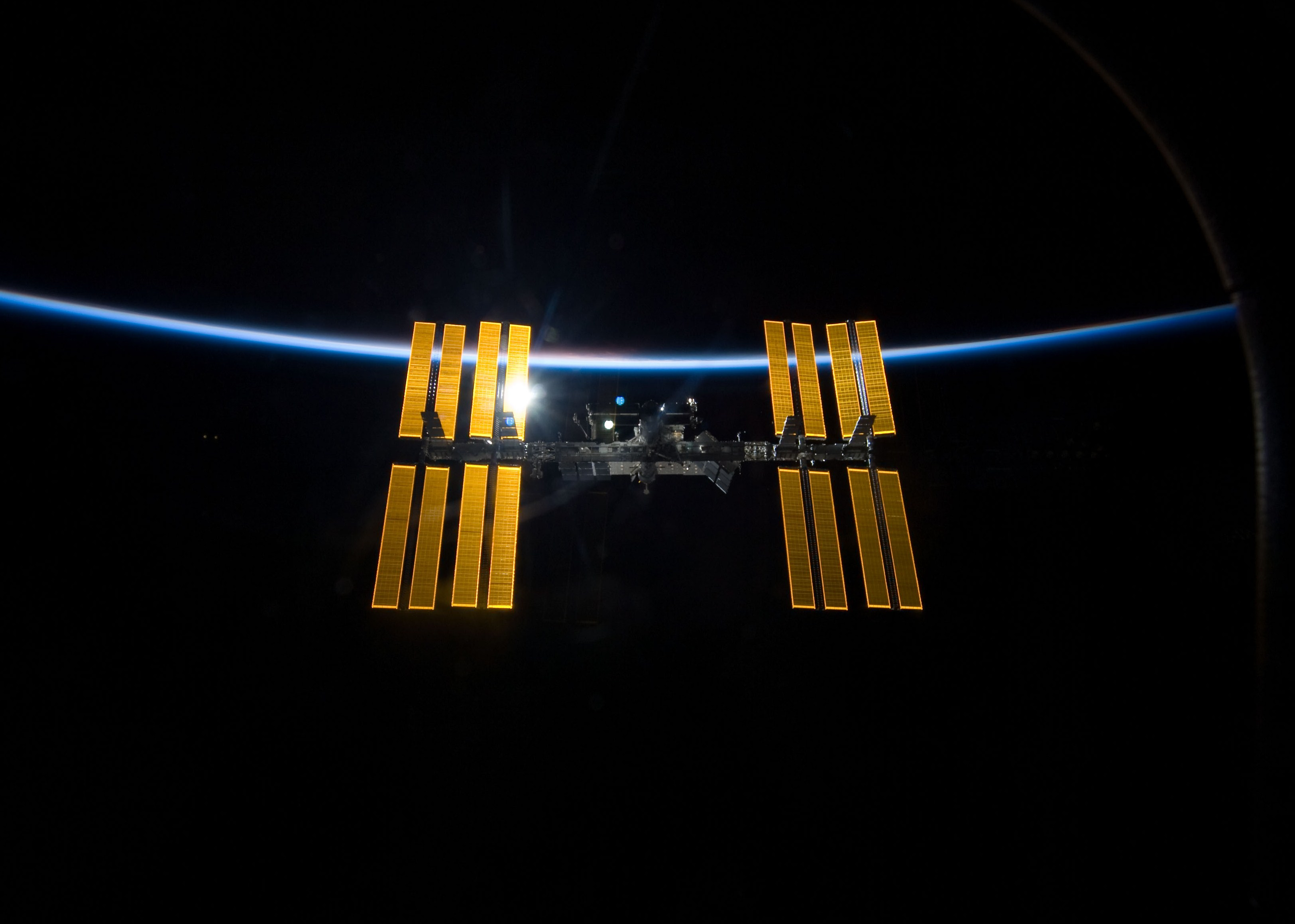
- Departing view of the ISS from Discovery, with the station's fourth and final set of solar arrays installed
- Names: Space Transportation System-119
- Mission type: ISS assembly
- Operator: NASA
- COSPAR ID: 2009-012A
- SATCAT no.: 34541
- Mission duration: 12 days, 19 hours, 29 minutes, 33 seconds
- Distance travelled: 8,609,790km (5,349,419 miles)
- Orbits completed: 202

Spacecraft properties
- Spacecraft: Space Shuttle Discovery
- Launch mass: 120,859 kilograms (266,448 lb)
- Landing mass: 91,166 kilograms (200,986 lb)
- Payload mass: 29,693kg (65,461lb)

Crew
- Crew size: 7
- Members: Lee Archambault; Dominic A. Antonelli; Joseph M. Acaba; Steven Swanson; Richard R. Arnold; John L. Phillips
- Launching: Koichi Wakata
- Landing: Sandra Magnus

Start of mission
- Launch date: March 15, 2009, 23:43 UTC
- Launch site: Kennedy, LC-39A

End of mission
- Landing date: March 28, 2009, 19:13 UTC
- Landing site: Kennedy, SLF Runway 15

Orbital parameters
- Reference system: Geocentric
- Regime: Low Earth
- Perigee altitude: 385 kilometres (208 nmi)
- Apogee altitude: 402 kilometres (217 nmi)
- Inclination: 51.6 degrees
- Period: 91.6 minutes

Docking with ISS
- Docking port: PMA-2 (Harmony forward)
- Docking date: March 17, 2009, 21:20 UTC
- Undocking date: March 25, 2009, 19:53 UTC
- Time docked: 7 days, 22 hours, 33 minutes
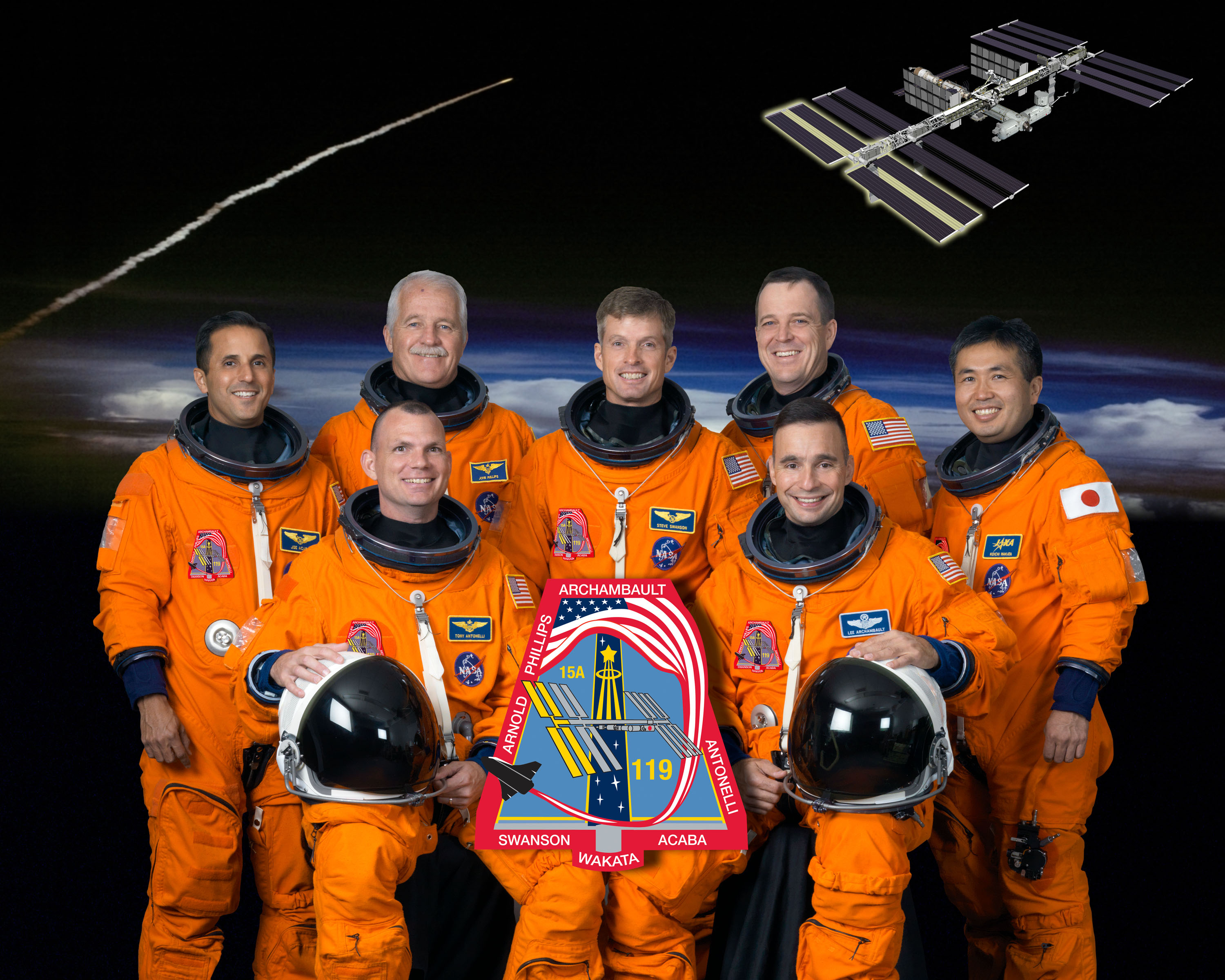
- Front row (L–R) Antonelli, Archambault. Back row (L–R) Acaba, Phillips, Swanson, Arnold and Wakata. Space Shuttle program

STS-119 (ISS assembly flight 15A) was a Space Shuttle mission to the International Space Station (ISS) which was flown by Space Shuttle Discovery during March 2009. It was Discovery's 36th flight. It delivered and assembled the fourth starboard Integrated Truss Segment (S6), and the fourth set of solar arrays and batteries to the station. The launch took place on March 15, 2009, at 19:43 EDT. Discovery successfully landed on March 28, 2009, at 15:13 pm EDT.

== Crew ==
Position	Launching Astronaut	Landing Astronaut
Commander	(United States) Lee Archambault; Second and last spaceflight	
Pilot	(United States) Dominic A. Antonelli; First spaceflight	
Mission Specialist 1	(United States) Joseph M. Acaba; First spaceflight	
Mission Specialist 2 Flight Engineer	(United States) Steven Swanson; Second spaceflight	
Mission Specialist 3	(United States) Richard R. Arnold; First spaceflight	
Mission Specialist 4	(United States) John L. Phillips; Third and last spaceflight	
Mission Specialist 5	(Japan) Koichi Wakata, JAXA; Expedition 18/19/20; Third spaceflight	(United States) Sandra Magnus; Expedition 18; Second spaceflight

=== Crew notes ===
This mission was originally scheduled to bring the Expedition 9 crew to the ISS. This crew would have consisted of:

Position	Launching Astronaut	Landing Astronaut
Commander	Steven Lindsey	
Pilot	Mark Kelly	
Mission Specialist 1	Michael L. Gernhardt	
Mission Specialist 2 Flight Engineer	Carlos I. Noriega	
Mission Specialist 3	Gennady Padalka, RKA; Expedition 9 ISS Commander	Michael Foale; Expedition 8 ISS Commander
Mission Specialist 4	Michael Fincke; Expedition 9 ISS Flight Engineer	Bill McArthur; Expedition 8 ISS Flight Engineer
Mission Specialist 5	Oleg Kononenko, RKA; Expedition 9 ISS Flight Engineer	Valery Tokarev, RKA; Expedition 8 ISS Flight Engineer

== Mission payload ==
STS-119 delivered the S6 solar arrays to the space station, completing the construction of the Integrated Truss Structure. STS-119 also carried several experiments, including the Shuttle Ionospheric Modification with Pulsed Local EXhaust (SIMPLEX), Shuttle Exhaust Ion Turbulence Experiments (SEITE), and Maui Analysis of Upper Atmospheric Injections (MAUI). STS-119 was also used for the "Boundary Layer Transition Detailed Test Objective" experiment. One tile of the thermal protection system was raised 0.25 inches (6.4 mm) above the others so that, at about Mach 15 during reentry, a boundary layer transition would be initiated. This experiment was repeated during STS-128 with the tile raised to 0.35 inches (8.9 mm), tripping at Mach 18 to produce more heat.

Location	Cargo	Mass
Bays 1–2	Orbiter Docking System; EMU 3017 / EMU 3006	1,800 kilograms (4,000 lb); ~260 kilograms (570 lb)
Bay 3P	Shuttle Power; Distribution Unit (SPDU)	~17 kilograms (37 lb)
Bays 3–13	S6 Truss	14,088 kilograms (31,059 lb)
Starboard Sill	Orbiter Boom Sensor System	~382 kilograms (842 lb)
Port Sill	Canadarm 202	410 kilograms (900 lb)
	Total:	16,957 kilograms (37,384 lb)

=== Crew seat assignments ===
Seat	Launch	Landing	Seats 1–4 are on the flight deck. Seats 5–7 are on the mid-deck.
1	Archambault		Seats 1–4 are on the flight deck. Seats 5–7 are on the mid-deck.
2	Antonelli		Seats 1–4 are on the flight deck. Seats 5–7 are on the mid-deck.
3	Acaba		Seats 1–4 are on the flight deck. Seats 5–7 are on the mid-deck.
4	Swanson		Seats 1–4 are on the flight deck. Seats 5–7 are on the mid-deck.
5	Arnold		Seats 1–4 are on the flight deck. Seats 5–7 are on the mid-deck.
6	Phillips		Seats 1–4 are on the flight deck. Seats 5–7 are on the mid-deck.
7	Wakata	Magnus	Seats 1–4 are on the flight deck. Seats 5–7 are on the mid-deck.

== Mission background ==
- 156th NASA crewed space flight
- 125th shuttle mission since STS-1
- 36th Flight of Discovery
- 100th post-Challenger mission
- 12th post-Columbia mission
- 28th shuttle mission to the International Space Station

== Shuttle processing ==
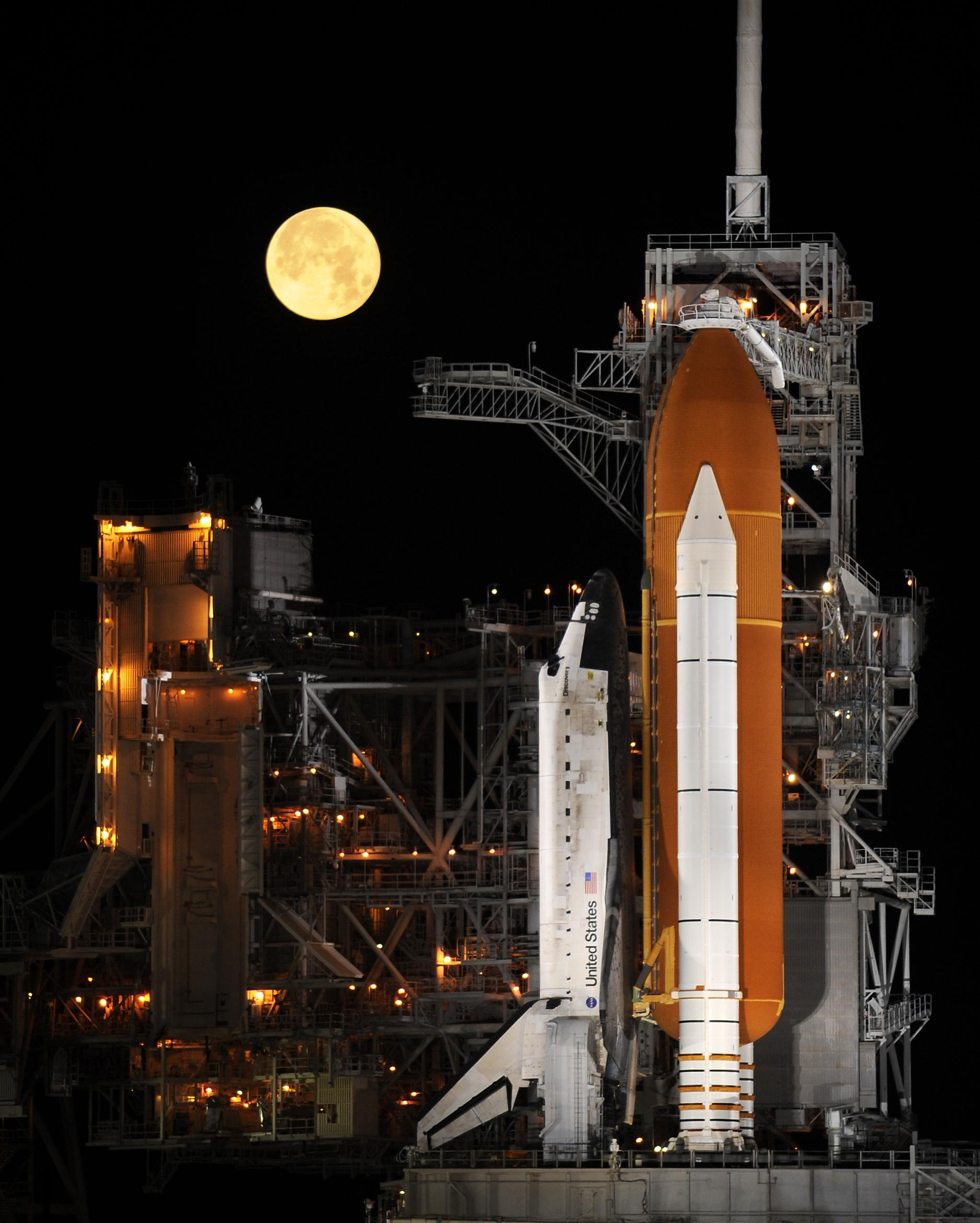
Space Shuttle Discovery on the morning of March 11, 2009.

Space Shuttle Discovery moved from its Orbiter Processing Facility to the Vehicle Assembly Building on January 7, 2009. The payload of the S6 truss segment, solar arrays and batteries were delivered to Launch pad 39A on January 11. Discovery moved to the launch pad 39A on January 14, 2009. The move began at 05:17 EST, and was completed at 12:16 EST.

The STS-119 crew was at Kennedy Space Center from January 19–22, 2009 for the Terminal Countdown Demonstration Test. On January 21–22, 2009, mission managers met for the program level Flight Readiness Review (FRR). Following the FRR, mission managers recommended evaluating the hydrogen flow control valves on Discovery, and set a new target launch date of February 19, 2009.

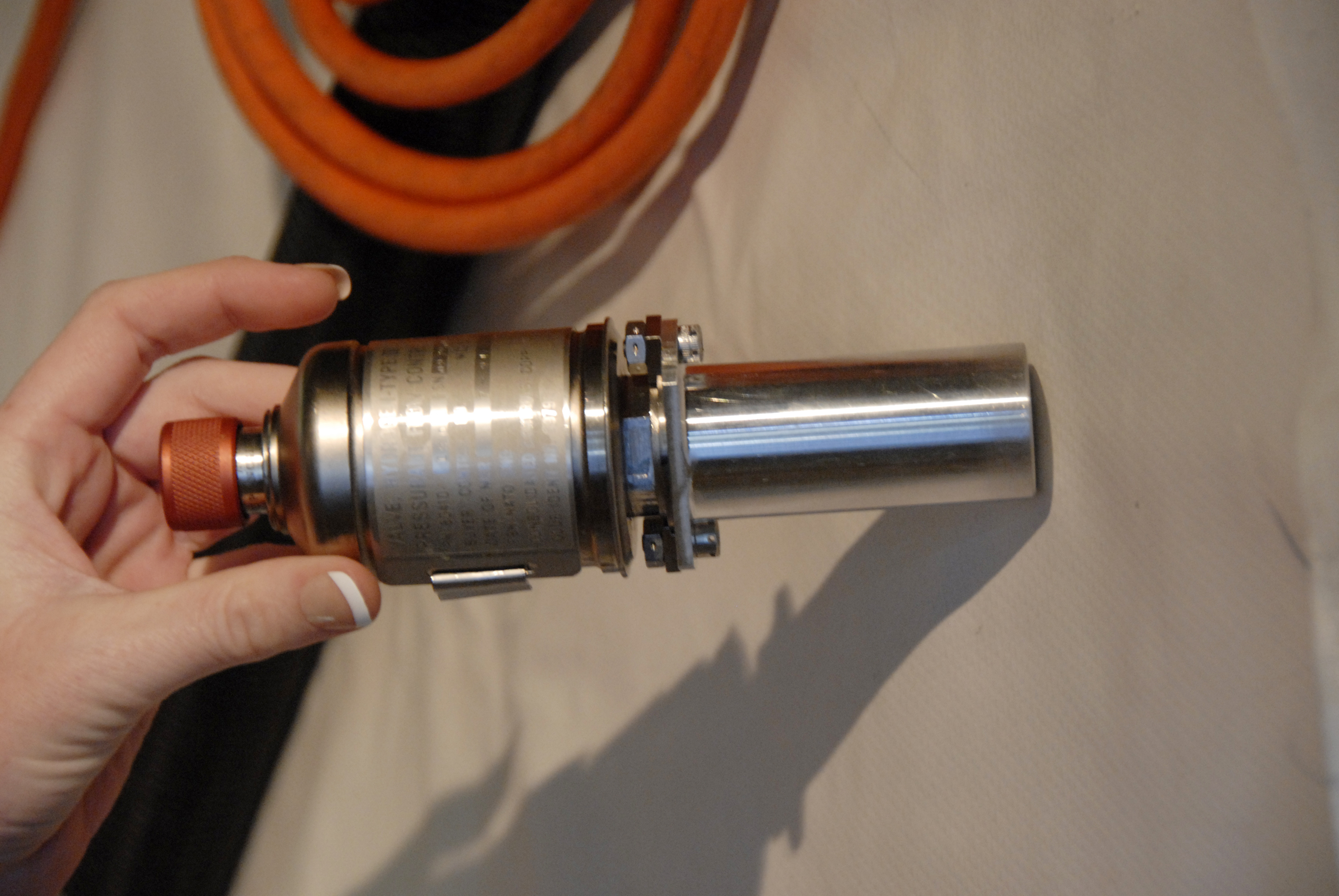
The type of valve that was an interim concern.

Due to the breakage of one of three flow control valves on the previous flight, STS-126, the flow valves of all orbiters were subjected to tests to determine if Discovery was safe to fly. These valves are used to synchronize the flow of gaseous hydrogen between the external fuel tank and the main engines, creating an even flow. Following the testing of the valves, mission managers decided to postpone the launch, and engineers were asked to replace the suspect flow valves with valves that had less flight time.

Following the replacement of the valves, the Mission Management Team gave the approval for launch, and scheduled it for March 11, 2009. The astronauts arrived at the Kennedy Space Center on March 8, 2009, to prepare for launch. The March 11, 2009, launch was scrubbed due to a leak in a liquid hydrogen vent line between the shuttle and the external tank. On March 15, 2009, the shuttle successfully lifted off from pad 39A. The leak problem manifested itself again during STS-127 which led to a thorough test. The root cause was found to be a misalignment in the GUCP (Ground Umbilical Carrier Plate) which was set right leading to a successful flight.

Attempt	Planned	Result	Turnaround	Reason	Decision point	Weather go (%)	Notes
1	11 Mar 2009, 9:20:14 pm	Scrubbed	—	Technical	11 Mar 2009, 2:37 pm	95	Leak in a liquid hydrogen vent line.
2	15 Mar 2009, 7:43:44 pm	Success	3 days 22 hours 23 minutes			100	

== Mission timeline ==
=== March 15 (Flight day 1, Launch) ===
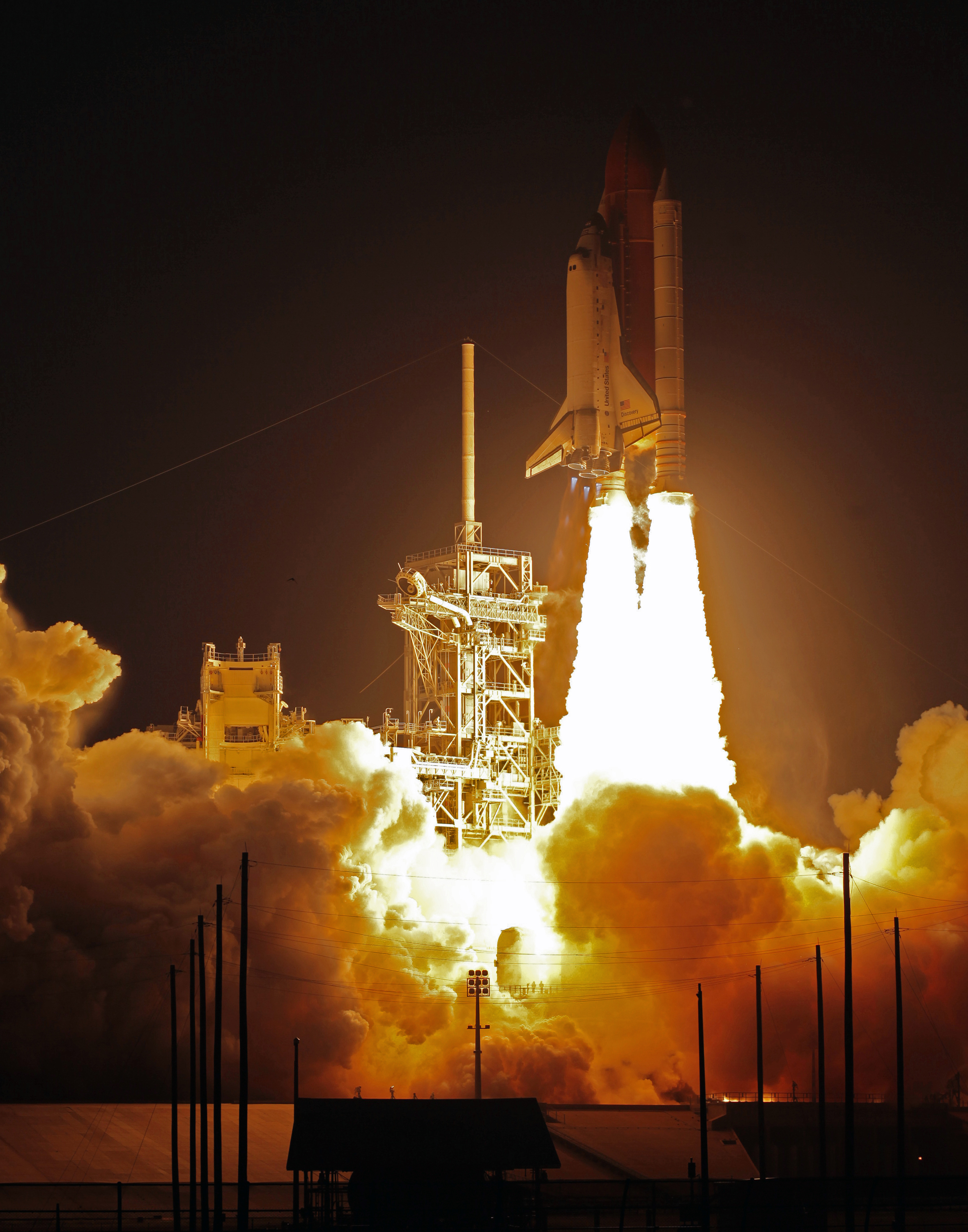
Space Shuttle Discovery lifts off from Kennedy Space Center.

Space Shuttle Discovery launched on time at 19:43 EDT without any issues. Upon initial review of early ascent imagery, mission managers did not see anything out of the ordinary with debris at launch. "We didn't see anything at all in the first quick look," noted Bill Gerstenmaier, Associate Administrator for Space Operations, during the post-launch news conference. "I've seen a lot of launches," commented Launch Director Michael D. Leinbach during the conference, "and this was the most visibly beautiful launch I've ever seen." After reaching orbit, the STS-119 crew got to work on their orbit operations, opening the payload bay doors, deploying the Ku band antenna, and activating and checking out the shuttle's robotic arm. The crew also downlinked the imagery taken of the external tank separation.

==== Bat stowaway ====
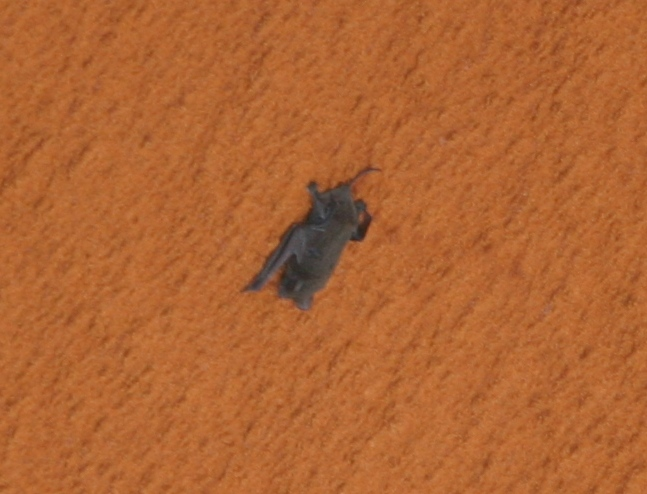
Bat clinging to the External Tank.

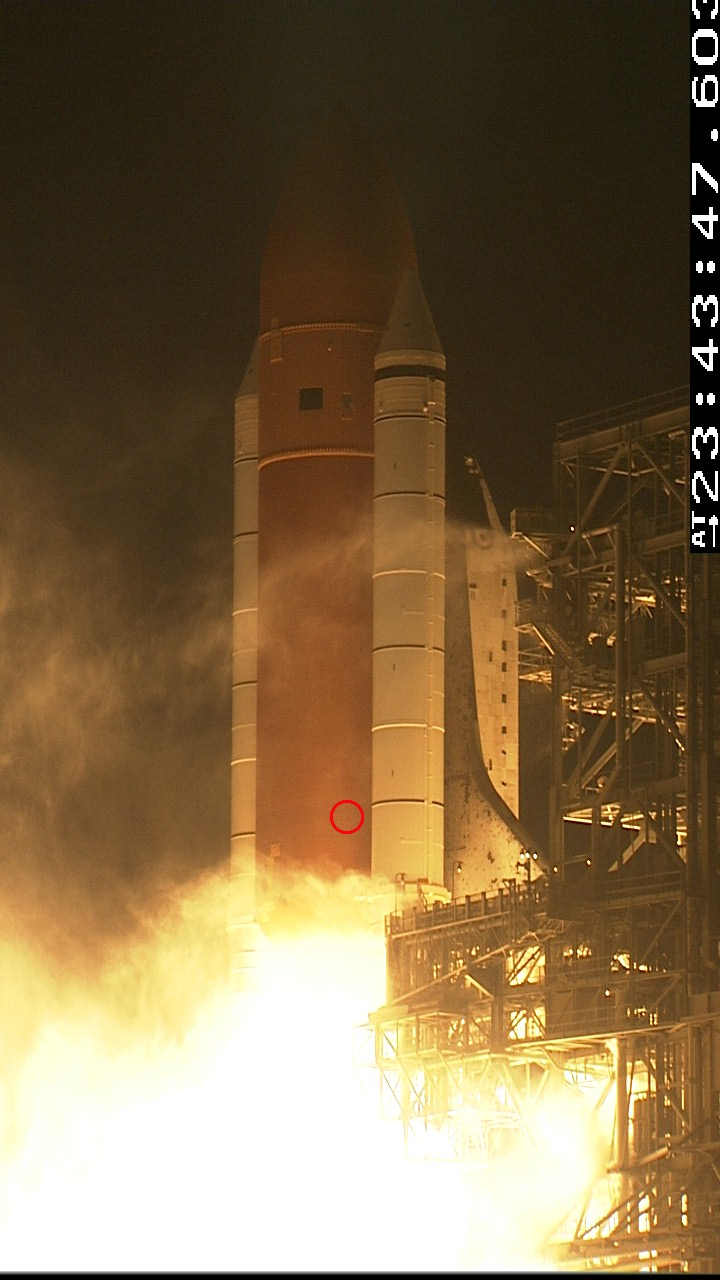
Rear view of Discovery's launch. The bat (circled in red) continues to cling to the External Tank.

During the countdown a bat was seen to be resting on the external tank. What was originally believed to be a fruit bat was revealed to have been a free-tailed bat that clung onto the fuel tank during the launch. NASA observers had believed the bat would fly off once the shuttle started to launch, but it did not, and continued to remain on the external tank as the shuttle lifted off. It was probably shaken off and incinerated by the rocket exhaust. A bat doctor, analyzing pictures, believed the bat had a broken wing which made it unable to fly off.

=== March 16 (Flight day 2) ===
Following the crew's wakeup call, the members of STS-119 set to work on the day's task of inspecting Discovery's thermal protection system. Using the shuttle's robotic arm and the Orbiter Boom Sensor System (OBSS), the crew performed the five-hour inspection, and the images and video from the survey would be reviewed by the image analysis team on the ground. In preparation for docking with the space station on flight day three, the crew performed a checkout of the spacesuits that would be used during the mission, as well as extending the ring of the orbital docking system, and installing the docking system's centerline camera.

Initial review of the flight ascent imagery indicated no major problems with foam loss or debris strikes to the orbiter. During the day's Mission Management Team briefing, chairman LeRoy Cain noted that the launch was "picture perfect" and the orbiter was in excellent condition. Cain also noted that after an initial review of the telemetry from the launch, the hydrogen flow control valves performed as expected, with no issues seen.

=== March 17 (Flight day 3) ===
The crew of Discovery got to work in the morning preparing for rendezvous and docking with the space station. After performing the rendezvous pitch maneuver (RPM) to allow the Expedition 18 crew to photograph the underside of the orbiter, Discovery successfully docked with the station at 21:20 UTC. Following hatch leak checks, the hatches were opened at 23:09 UTC. After greeting each other, the crews had a mandatory station safety briefing, and then set to work with initial transfers, including the exchange of Magnus' Soyuz seat liner for Wakata's. The swap of the seat liners marked Wakata officially joining the Expedition 18 crew as flight engineer, and Magnus became a mission specialist for STS-119.

During the Mission Status briefing, Lead Flight Director Paul Dye commended Archambault on a picture perfect docking. Dye said that no major issues or anomalies were being tracked, but noted that the image analysis team was still working on ascent imagery, and would be reviewing the RPM imagery before making a decision as to whether Discovery would require a focused inspection.

=== March 18 (Flight day 4) ===
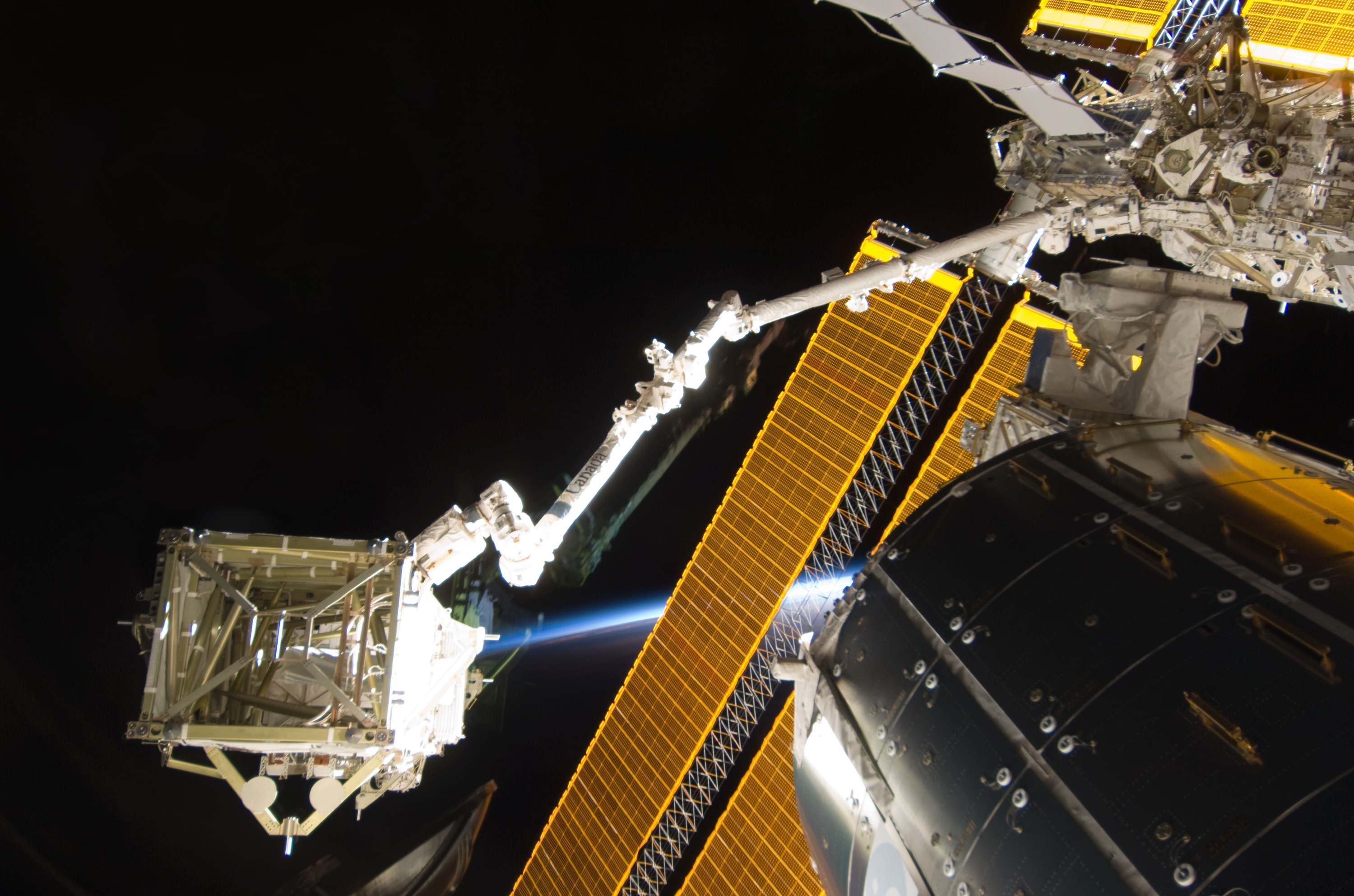
The handover of the S6 truss truss segment.

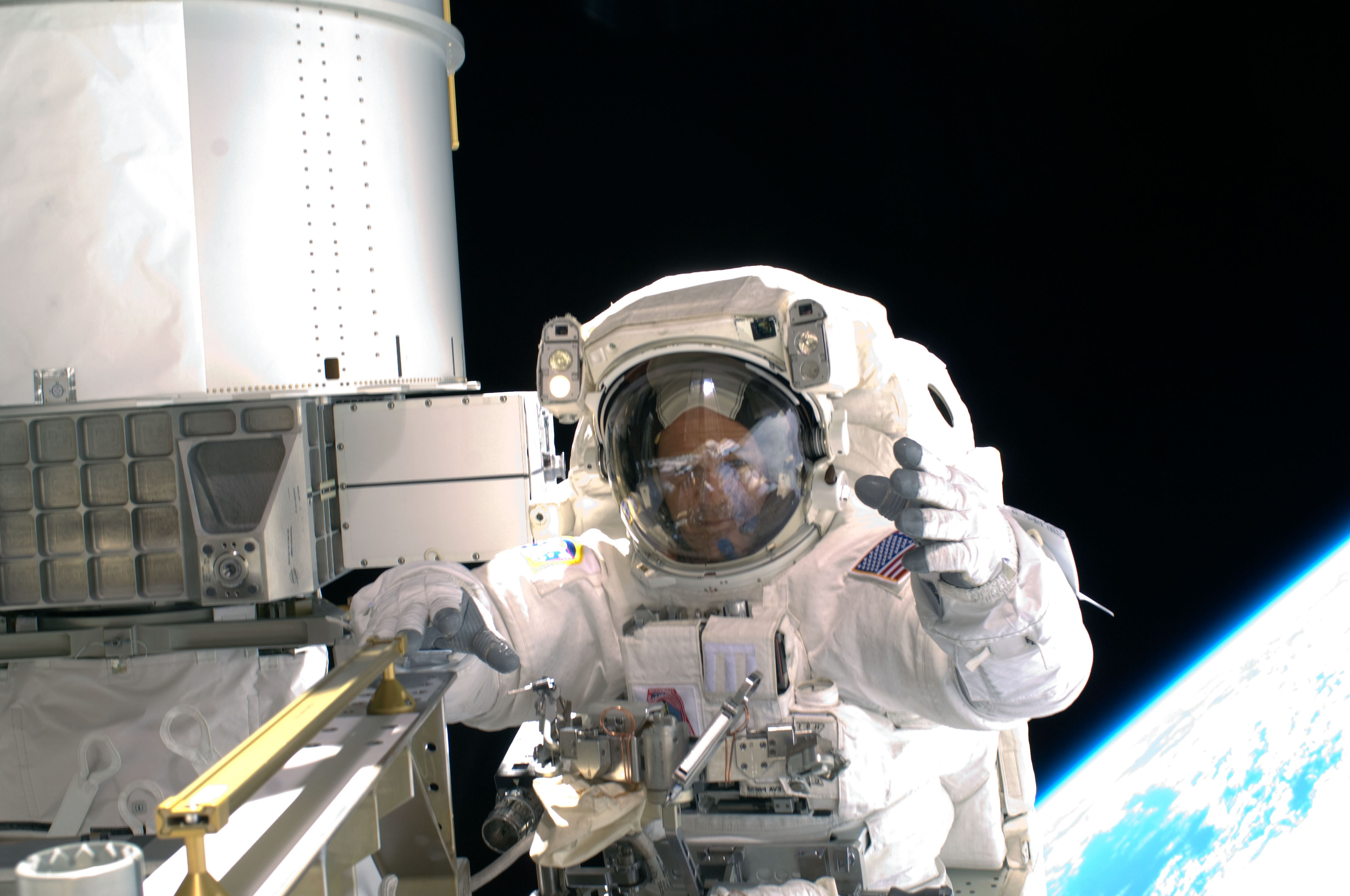
Mission Specialist Arnold during his first spacewalk.

Following the crew's post-sleep activities, the two crews set to work preparing for the next day's spacewalk, by moving the S6 truss out of Discovery's payload bay. Due to clearance restrictions, the station's robotic arm was not able to perform the move by itself, so a series of 'handoffs' were performed to prepare the truss for installation. Phillips and Magnus controlled the station's arm, grappled the truss and moved it into a position where the shuttle's robotic arm, operated by Antonelli, could take possession.

The station arm was then moved along the mobile base to a work site on the far right side, closer to the installation point. The shuttle's robotic arm then handed the truss back to the station's arm, where it remained overnight.

The crews took part in a media event with Channel One News, and performed a review of the procedures for the first EVA. Mission Specialists Swanson and Arnold spent the night in the Quest airlock camping out in a reduced-nitrogen atmosphere, a standard procedure designed for spacewalkers to prevent decompression symptoms.

During the Mission Management Team briefing, Lead ISS Flight Director Kwatsi Alibaruho noted that the imagery specialists with the Damage Assessment Team had completed the initial review of the launch and flight day 2 photography, and a focused inspection of the orbiter would not be required.

=== March 19 (Flight day 5, Spacewalk 1) ===
The two crews set to work following their wake up call, preparing for the first spacewalk of the mission. Swanson and Arnold exited the Quest airlock at 16:22 UTC to begin the installation of the S6 truss segment. Once Swanson and Arnold were in position, Phillips and Wakata remotely controlled the station's robotic arm, maneuvering the truss into its final position. Swanson and Arnold then bolted the truss into place, and connected power and data cables, which allowed the ground team to begin remote activation of the segment. The two spacewalkers also removed launch locks, stowed a keel pin, removed and jettisoned four thermal covers, and deployed the blanket boxes that hold the solar arrays in place during launch. The spacewalk ended at 21:11 UTC, for a total time of 6 hours, 7 minutes.

Initially scheduled for flight day 8, managers on the ground decided to move up the deployment of the solar arrays, following the decision that a focused inspection would not be required. It was decided that the deployment of the arrays would be performed on flight day 6, prior to the mission's second spacewalk, in case any issues arose that required a spacewalk to resolve.

=== March 20 (Flight day 6) ===
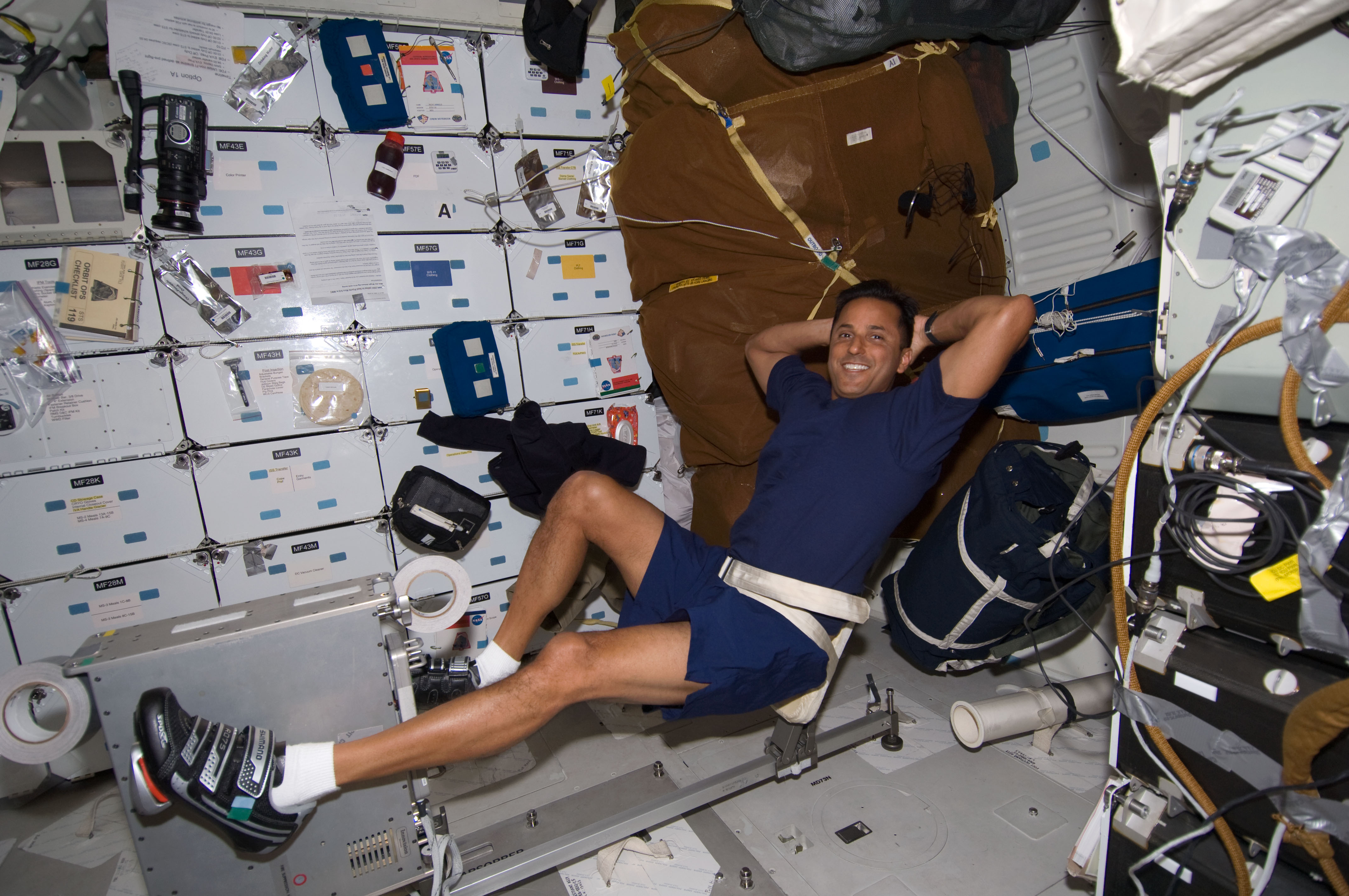
On flight day six, Mission Specialist Acaba used the shuttle's ergometer before the crews began deploying the solar arrays.

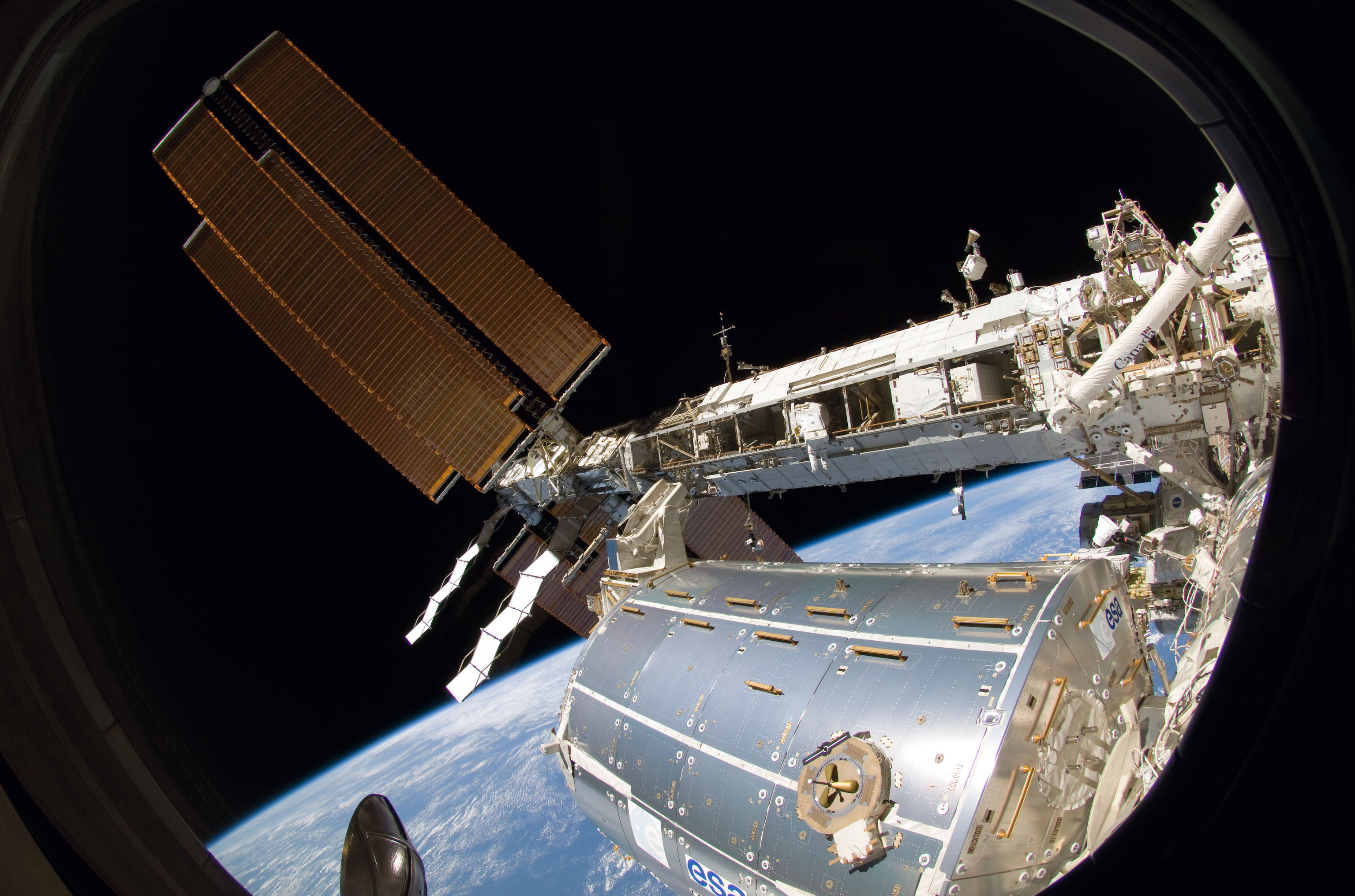
The S6 truss solar array unfurled.

As part of the re-planning for the mission, the crews set to work in the morning deploying the solar wings on the S6 truss. To prepare for the extension of the arrays, the station was maneuvered into a position that allowed constant sunlight to hit the arrays, which allowed them to warm up and prevent what the mission team calls 'stiction', or a sticky friction that happens after the arrays have been in storage for an extended period of time.

The unfurling of the arrays started at 15:06 UTC, beginning with the channel 1B array. Commanding the unit from the station, Philips paused at the halfway point, and allowed the array to rest in the sun for approximately 45 minutes, and then completed the extension. After successfully extending the 1B array, the astronauts started the 3B array extension at 16:35 UTC. The 3B array was expected to be more difficult to extend, as it had been packed in the blanket box for eight years. As with the first, a pause at halfway was performed to allow the arrays to heat up in the sun. While some stiction was seen, once the final extension began all the slats flattened out, and the arrays were fully deployed at 17:17 UTC. The addition of the final set of solar panels brings the station's power output to 120 kilowatts, and doubles the scientific power to 30 kilowatts. The station's surface area of the arrays is just under one acre, or 38,400 square feet.

Later in the day, Fincke, Lonchakov, Wakata and Magnus participated in a media event with Reuters, Voice of America, and the Pittsburgh Post-Gazette.

During the Mission Status briefing, Alibaruho expressed how pleased the teams on the ground were with the successful deployment of the arrays, and commended the crew on the deployment activities. Mission Management Team Chairman LeRoy Cain noted that the team was working on a revised timetable to allow critical experiment samples to return to Earth safely. The samples need to be kept in a cold environment, and in the event weather delayed the landing, the team evaluated the best way to preserve the samples. The team approved a revised flight plan that allows Discovery to delay hatch closure and undocking slightly, to allow the samples to be kept inside the station's freezer longer, while still protecting the landing date of March 28. Instead of closing the hatch the night before undocking, the hatch would be closed on the same day, flight day eleven.

It was a truly fantastic day in space. The International Space Station team and its partnerships are on cloud nine with the completion of the integrated truss assembly, as well as the finalization of our electrical power grid on the space station. It took years to get here. We had some struggles along the way, but it's a major accomplishment for NASA and the partnership team.

— Dan Hartman, Space Station Mission Management Team Chairman

=== March 21 (Flight day 7, Spacewalk 2) ===
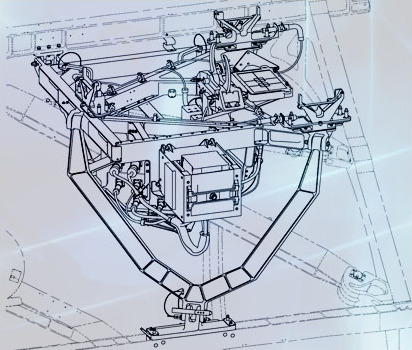
The unpressurized cargo carrier attachment system (UCCAS)

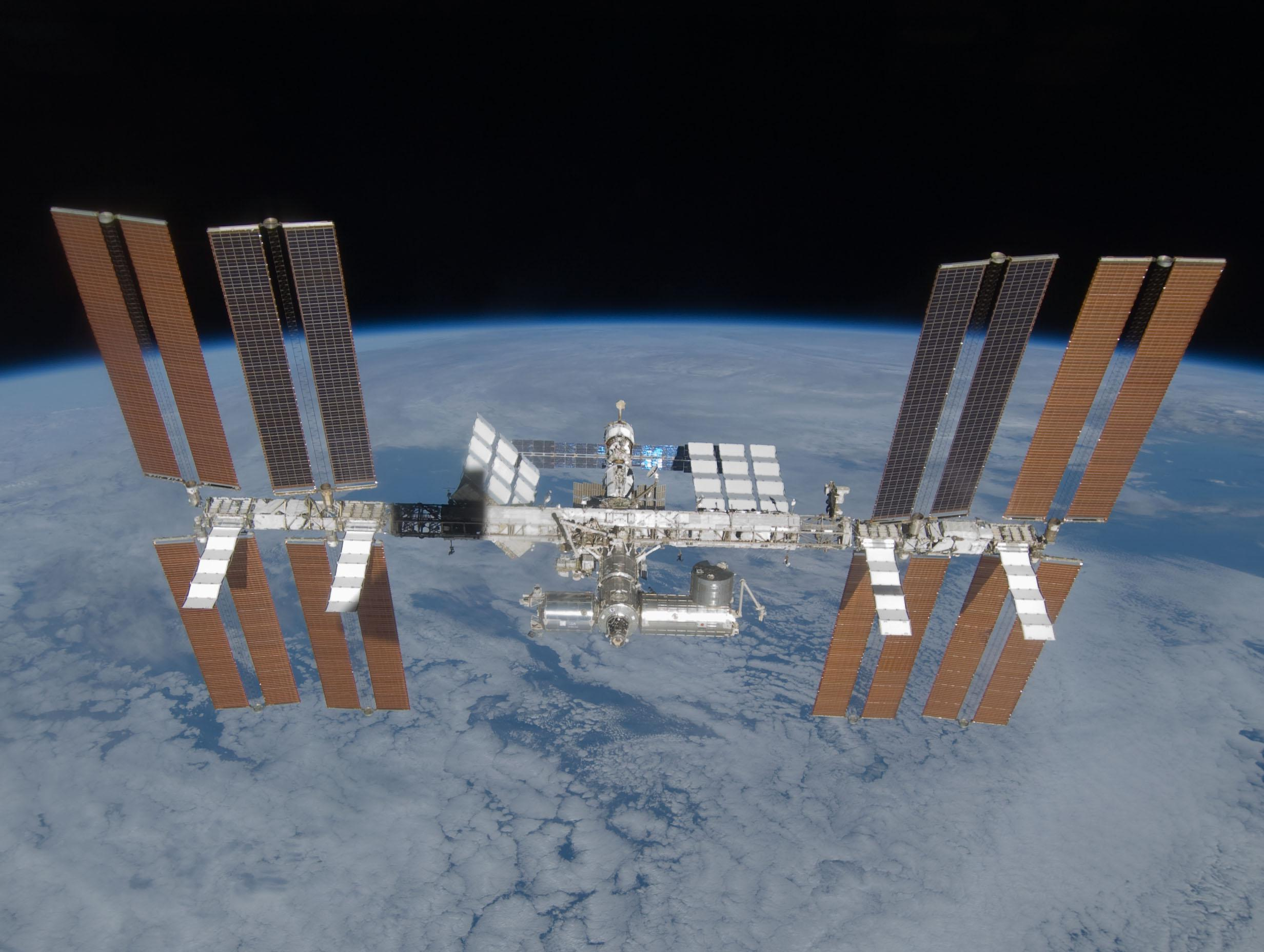
ISS after departure of STS-119

Swanson and Acaba began the second spacewalk at 16:51 UTC. They loosened bolts, installed foot restraints and prepared tools so that the STS-127 spacewalkers could more easily change out the Port 6 truss batteries later this year. On the Japanese Kibo laboratory they installed a second Global Positioning Satellite antenna. They photographed areas of radiator panels extended from the Port 1 and Starboard 1 trusses and reconfigured connectors at a patch panel on the Zenith 1 truss that power Control Moment Gyroscopes. After struggling with a pin that kept an Unpressurized Cargo Carrier Attachment System (UCCAS) from fully deploying, they tied UCCAS safely in place. The spacewalk ended at 23:21 UTC, for a time of six hours and thirty minutes.

=== March 22 (Flight day 8) ===
At 20:31 UTC, Discovery rotated the shuttle-station complex 180 degrees, to avoid a piece of orbital debris. At 23:23, Discovery began rotating the station back to normal attitude, with the shuttle in 'back'.

Fincke continued to work on the Urine Processor Assembly, while Acaba and Arnold entered the Quest Airlock to prepare for the mission's third spacewalk.

=== March 23 (Flight day 9, Spacewalk 3) ===
Acaba and Arnold completed the mission's third spacewalk. They helped robotic arm operators relocate the Crew Equipment Translation Aid (CETA) cart from the Port 1 to Starboard 1 truss segment, installed a new coupler on the CETA cart, and lubricated snares on the space station's robotic arm.

They were unable to deploy the Port 3 unpressurized cargo carrier attachment system (UCCAS). They secured the UCCAS in place until engineers can evaluate the problem. Mission Control cancelled the installation of a similar payload attachment system on the starboard side. The port UCCAS was deployed successfully during STS-127 by releasing the stuck pin with a custom made tool.

The spacewalk lasted six hours, 27 minutes. It began at 15:37 UTC and concluded at 22:04 UTC.

=== March 24 (Flight day 10) ===
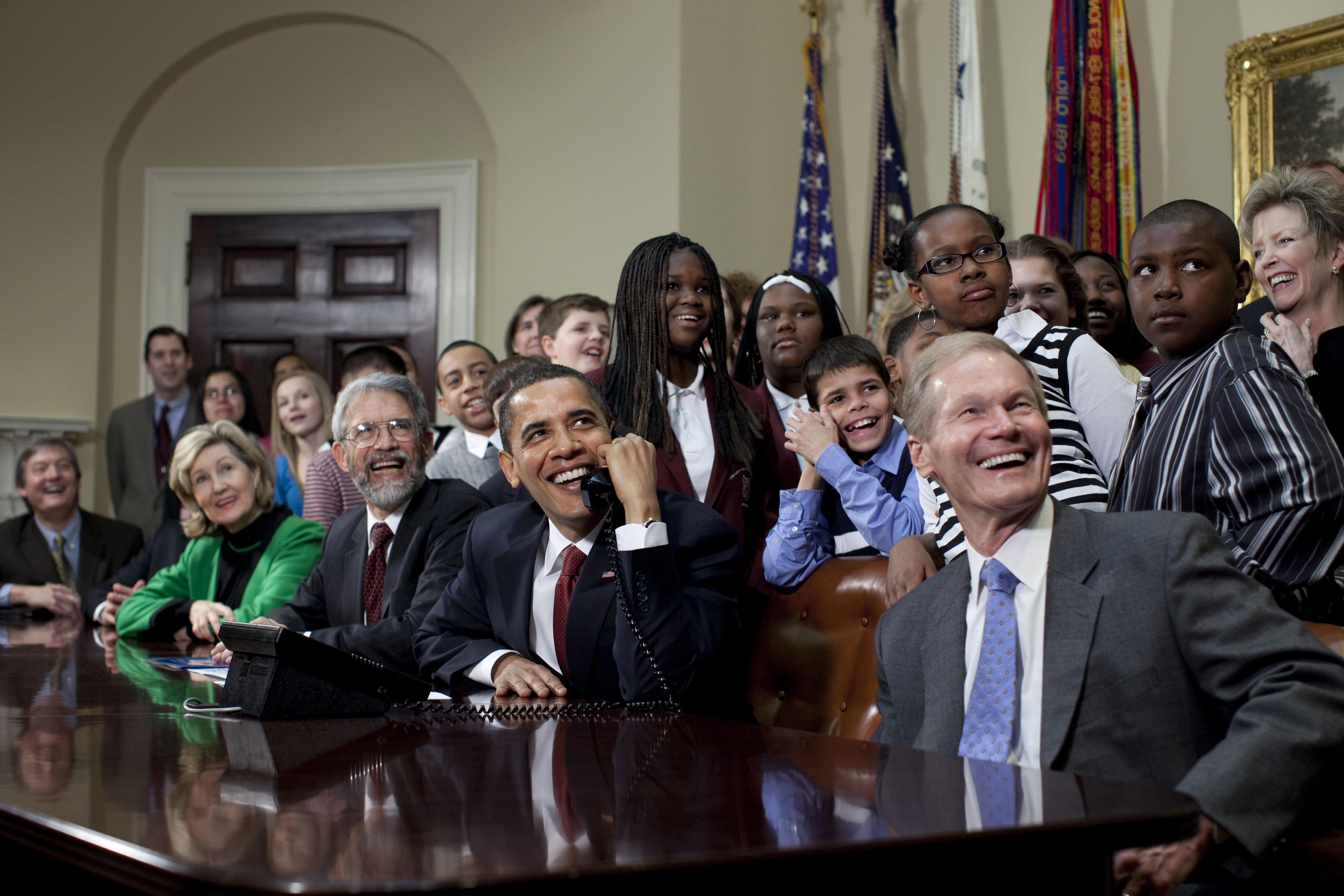
President Obama, members of Congress, and schoolchildren speak with astronauts aboard the ISS.

At 17:05 UTC, all crew members aboard Discovery and the space station gathered in the station's Harmony module and spoke to the President of the United States, members of the United States Congress, and students during a joint news conference.

=== March 25 (Flight day 11, Undocking) ===
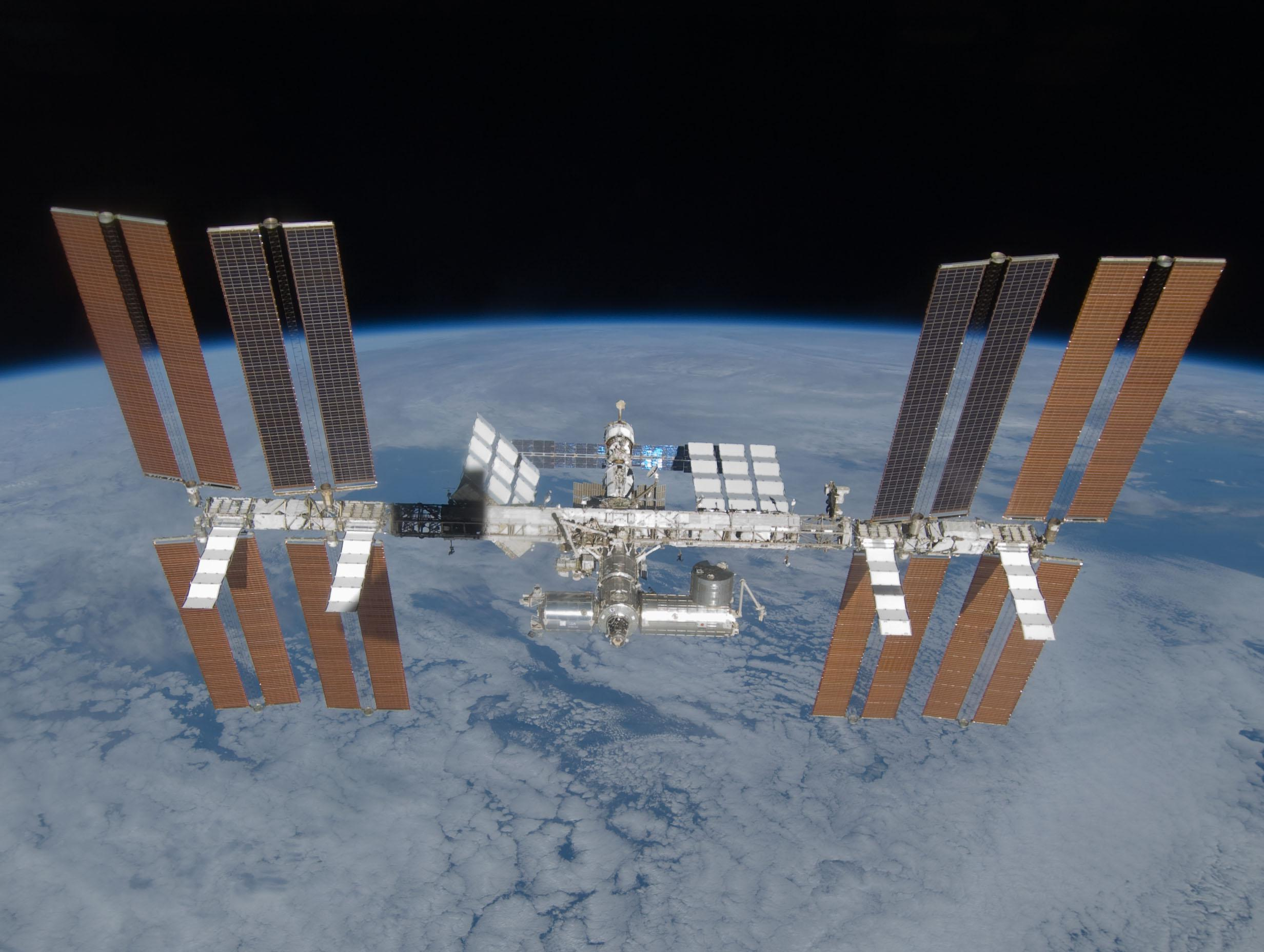
ISS after STS-119

Crew members from space shuttle Discovery and the International Space Station closed their respective hatches at 17:59 UTC. The Space Shuttle undocked from the International Space Station at 19:53 UTC.

=== March 26 (Flight day 12) ===
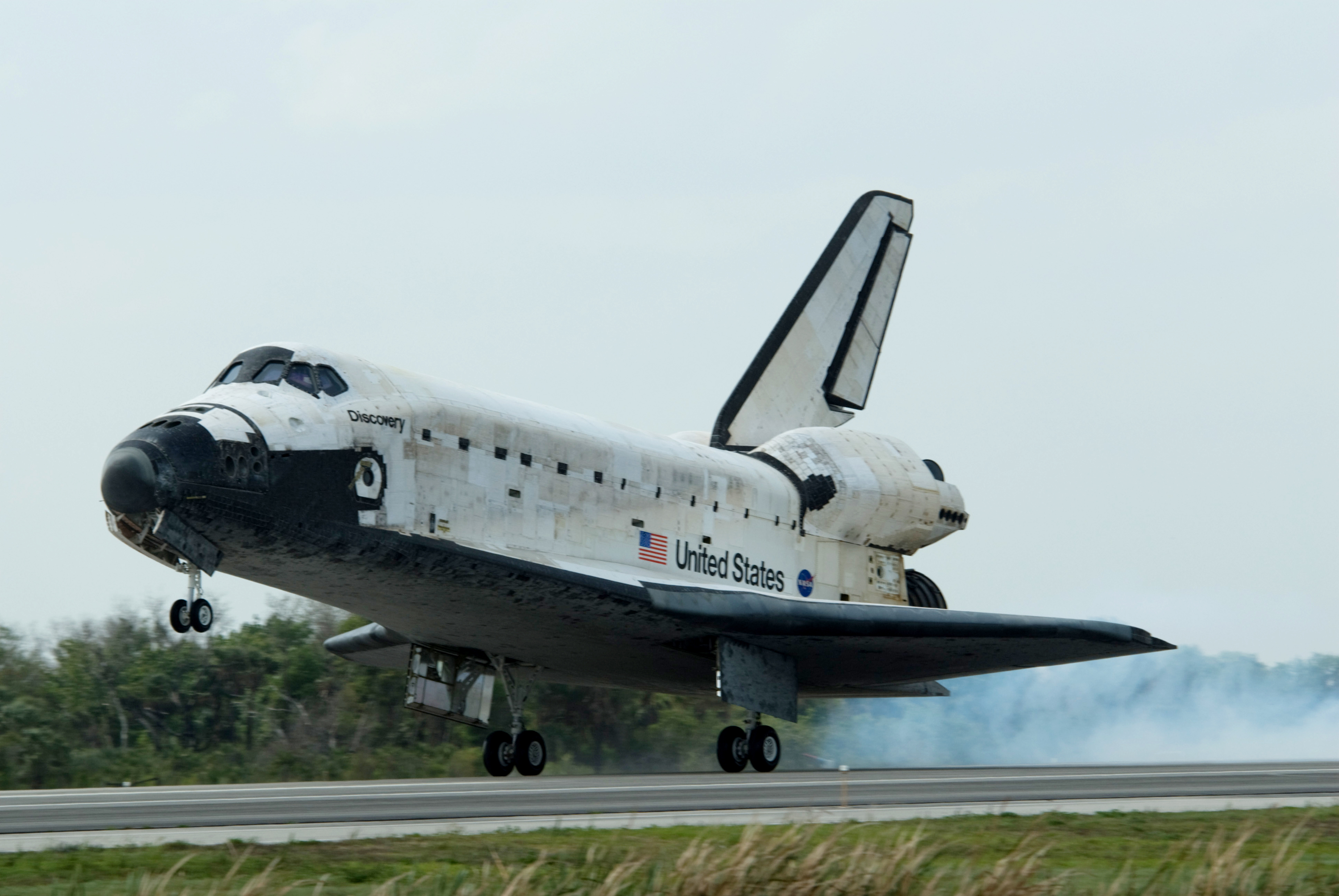
Space Shuttle Discovery lands after completing its STS-119 mission.

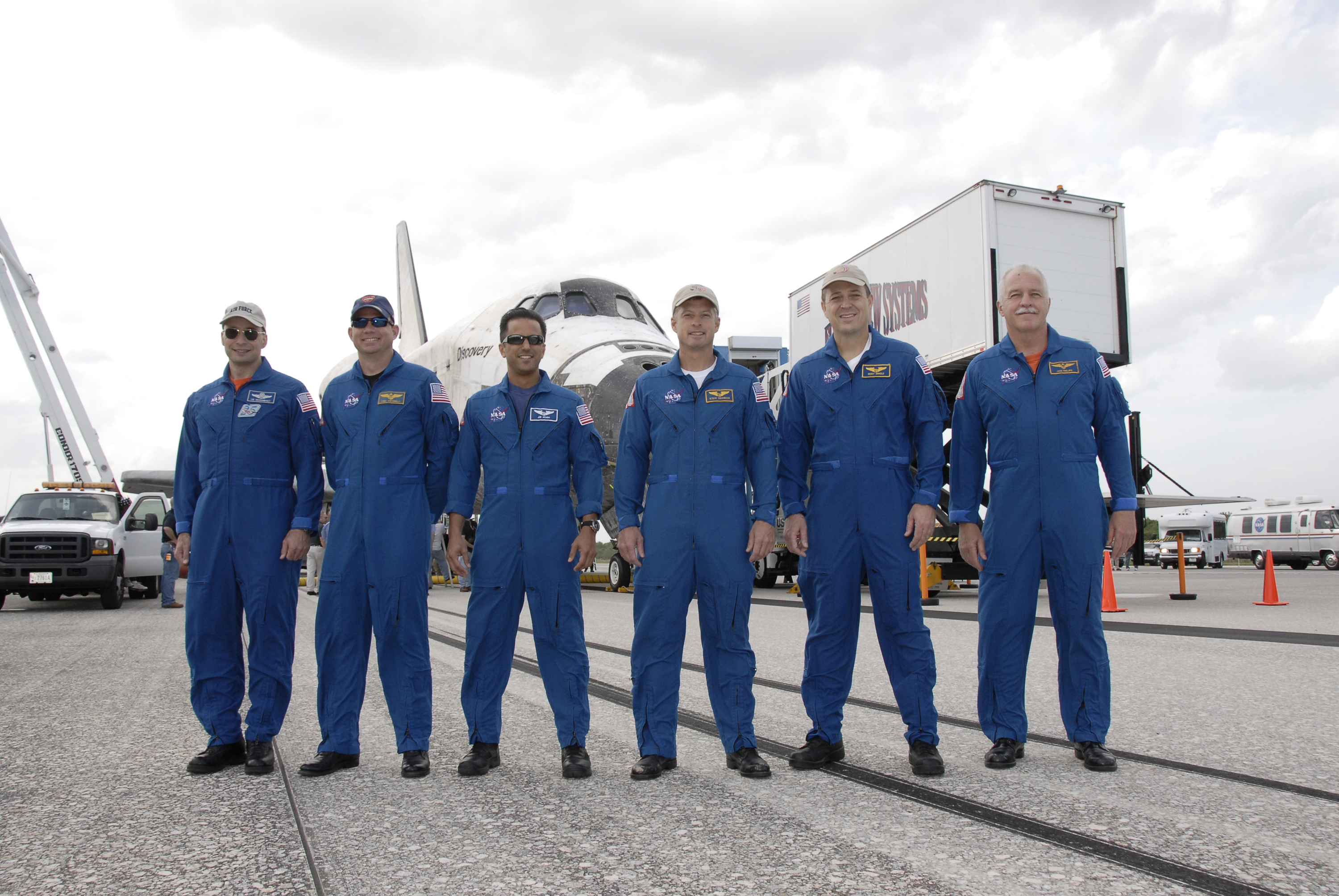
Members of the STS-119 crew pose after landing. L-R: Commander Lee Archambault, Pilot Tony Antonelli and Mission Specialists Joseph Acaba, Steve Swanson, Richard Arnold and John Phillips.

Antonelli used the shuttle's robotic arm to grapple the Orbiter Boom Sensor System enabling the cameras and laser sensors to scan Discovery for signs of damage from orbital debris.

=== March 27 (Flight day 13) ===
The crew stowed items in the crew cabin and completed a check out the orbiter's flight control surfaces.

=== March 28 (Flight day 14, Landing) ===
Following the wake up call, the crew on board Discovery got to work preparing for entry. After the first landing opportunity was waved off due to high wind concerns, the team on the ground gave the crew a 'go' to proceed with the second opportunity. Following the deorbit burn, the orbiter landed successfully at 15:13 EDT.

== Extra-vehicular activity ==
Three spacewalks were scheduled and completed during STS-119. The cumulative time in extra-vehicular activity during the mission was 19 hours and 4 minutes.

EVA	Spacewalkers	Start (UTC)	End (UTC)	Duration
EVA 1	Steven R. Swanson; Richard R. Arnold	March 19, 2009; 17:16	March 19, 2009; 23:23	6 hours, 7 minutes
EVA 1	Installed the Starboard 6 (S6) truss to the S5 truss, connected S5/S6 umbilicals, released launch restraints, removed keel pins, stored and removed thermal covers, and deployed the S6 photovoltaic radiator.			
EVA 2	Swanson; Joseph M. Acaba	March 21, 2009; 16:51	March 21, 2009; 23:21	6 hours, 30 minutes
EVA 2	Advanced preparation of a worksite for STS-127, partial installation of an unpressurized cargo carrier attachment system on the P3 truss, installation of a Global Positioning System antenna to the Kibo laboratory, infrared imagery of panels of the radiators on the P1 and S1 trusses.			
EVA 3	Acaba; Arnold	March 23, 2009; 15:37	March 23, 2009; 22:04	6 hours, 27 minutes
EVA 3	Relocation of a crew equipment cart, lubrication of station arm grapple snares, attempted deployment of a cargo carrier.			

== Wake-up calls ==
A tradition for NASA human spaceflights since the days of Gemini, is that mission crews are played a special musical track at the start of each day in space. Each track is specially chosen, often by their family, and usually has a special meaning to an individual member of the crew, or is applicable to their daily activities.

Flight Day	Song	Artist	Played for	Links
Day 2	"Free Bird"	Lynyrd Skynyrd	Tony Antonelli	WAV MP3 TRANSCRIPT
Day 3	""Radio Exercise""	Tokyo Broadcast Children's Choir	Koichi Wakata	WAV MP3 TRANSCRIPT
Day 4	"I Walk the Line"	Johnny Cash	Steven Swanson	WAV MP3 TRANSCRIPT
Day 5	"Que Bonita Bandera"	Florencio Morales Ramos, performed by Jose Gonzalez and Banda Criolla	Joe Acaba	WAV MP3 TRANSCRIPT
Day 6	"Box of Rain"	Grateful Dead	John Phillips	WAV MP3 TRANSCRIPT
Day 7	"In a Little While"	Pilgrim & Trout	Richard Arnold	WAV MP3 TRANSCRIPT
Day 8	"Alive Again"	Chicago	Lee Archambault	WAV MP3 TRANSCRIPT
Day 9	"Ain't Nobody Here but Us Chickens"	Louis Jordan	Steven Swanson	WAV MP3 TRANSCRIPT
Day 10	"Andrew's Song"	Treestump (Phillips' daughter's band)	John Phillips	WAV MP3 TRANSCRIPT
Day 11	"Dirty Water"	The Standells	Tony Antonelli	WAV MP3 TRANSCRIPT
Day 12	"Enter Sandman"	Metallica	Joe Acaba	WAV MP3 TRANSCRIPT
Day 13	"Bright Side of the Road"	Van Morrison	Richard Arnold	WAV MP3 TRANSCRIPT
Day 14	"I Have a Dream"	ABBA	Sandra Magnus	WAV MP3 TRANSCRIPT

== Media ==
Video of Space Shuttle Discovery's launch from launch pad 39A at Kennedy Space Center to begin the STS-119 mission

== See also ==
- 2009 in spaceflight
- List of human spaceflights
- List of International Space Station spacewalks
- List of Space Shuttle missions
- List of spacewalks 2000–2014
