= Lee Archambault =

American test pilot and NASA astronaut (born 1960)

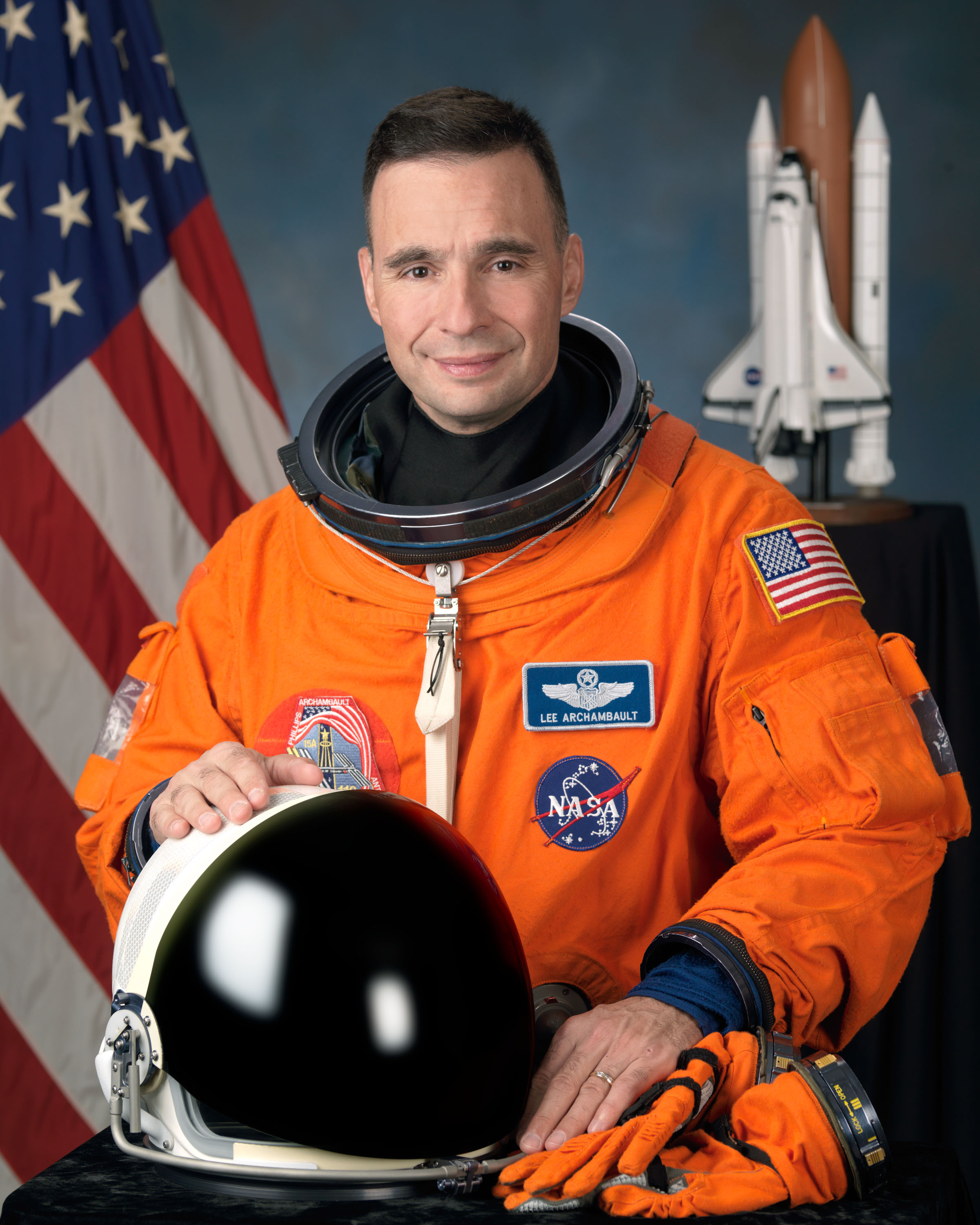
- Born: Lee Joseph Archambault; August 25, 1960 (age 66); Oak Park, Illinois, U.S.
- Other name: Bru
- Education: University of Illinois Urbana-Champaign (BS, MS)
- Space career

NASA astronaut
- Rank: Colonel, USAF
- Time in space: 26d 15h 33m
- Selection: NASA Group 17 (1998)
- Missions: STS-117; STS-119
- Mission insignia

Lee Joseph "Bru" Archambault (born August 25, 1960) is an American test pilot and former NASA astronaut. He has logged over 4,250 flight hours in more than 30 different aircraft. Archambault is married with three children. His hobbies include bicycling, weightlifting, and playing ice hockey. Archambault has received numerous awards and honors throughout his life. He has also flown two Space Shuttle missions, as pilot of STS-117 in 2007 and as commander of STS-119 in 2009. Archambault left NASA in 2013 after a 15-year career with the agency in order to become a test pilot for Sierra Nevada Corporation on their Dream Chaser orbital spaceplane project.

== Education ==
Archambault attended Proviso West High School in Hillside, Illinois in 1978. After graduating high school, he attended the University of Illinois Urbana-Champaign, where he earned Bachelor of Science and Master of Science degrees in aeronautical and astronautical engineering in 1982 and 1984, respectively.

== Military career ==
Archambault received a commission of Second Lieutenant in the United States Air Force from the Air Force Officer Training School at Lackland Air Force Base, Texas, in January 1985. Upon completion, he attended the Euro-NATO Joint Jet Pilot Training (ENJJPT) Program at Sheppard Air Force Base, Texas, and earned his pilot wings in April 1986. He then reported to Cannon Air Force Base, New Mexico, where he served as a combat ready F-111D pilot in the 27th Tactical Fighter Wing until April 1990. In May 1990, he transitioned to the F-117A in the 37th Tactical Fighter Wing at Nellis Air Force Base/Tonopah Test Range, Nevada. From November 1990 to April 1991, he deployed to Saudi Arabia in support of Operation Desert Shield/Desert Storm and flew twenty-two combat missions in the F-117A during the Gulf War. He served a second F-117A tour in Saudi Arabia from August 1991 to December 1991 in support of post-Desert Storm peacekeeping efforts. In August 1992, Archambault was reassigned to Holloman Air Force Base, New Mexico, where he served as an F-117A instructor pilot and operational test pilot for the 57th Wing. Archambault attended the U.S. Air Force Test Pilot School at Edwards Air Force Base, California, from July 1994 until June 1995. In July 1995, he was assigned to the 46th Test Wing at the Air Force Development Test Center, Eglin Air Force Base, Florida. There, he performed weapons developmental flight tests in all models of the F-16. Archambault was the assistant operations officer for the 39th Flight Test Squadron when he was selected for the astronaut program. Archambault is a Colonel in the U.S. Air Force.

== Awards and honors ==
Archambault has received many awards and honors, including the Distinguished Flying Cross, Defense Meritorious Service Medal, Meritorious Service Medal (2nd Oak Leaf Cluster), Air Medal (2nd Oak Leaf Cluster), Aerial Achievement Medal (4th Oak Leaf Cluster), Air Force Commendation Medal (1st Oak Leaf Cluster), Air Force Achievement Medal, Combat Readiness Medal, Southwest Asia Service Medal, Kuwait Liberation Medal, and various other service awards. He is a Distinguished Graduate and Liethen-Tittle Award recipient (top graduate) from the U.S. Air Force Test Pilot School, and a Distinguished Graduate from the U.S. Air Force Officer Training School. He graduated with honors from the University of Illinois, was listed as an Outstanding Recent Alumnus at the University of Illinois Aeronautical/Astronautical Engineering, and is a Hall of Fame inductee at Proviso West High School.

== NASA career ==
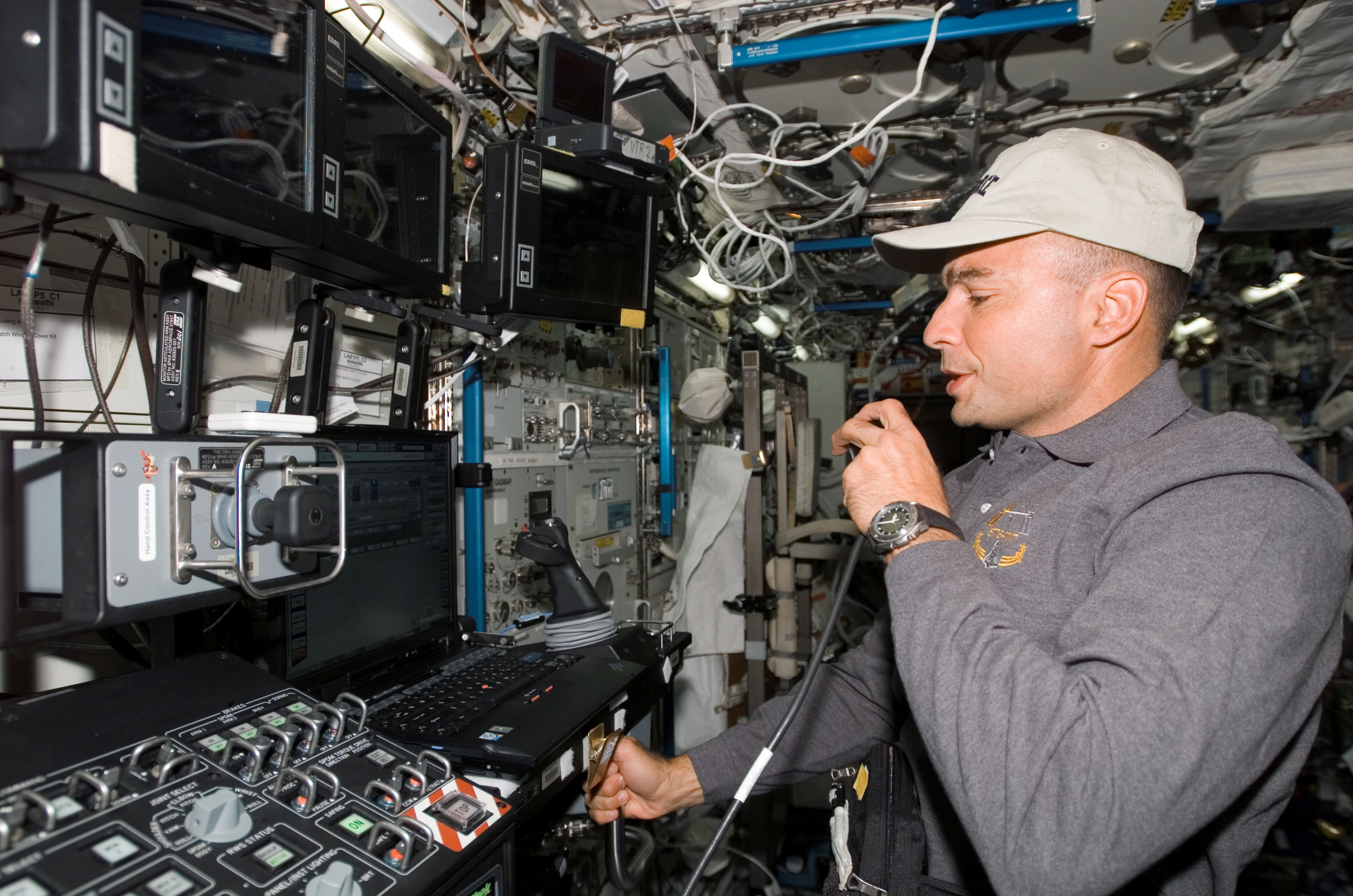
Lee Archambault at the Canada Arm 2 controls on ISS during STS-117

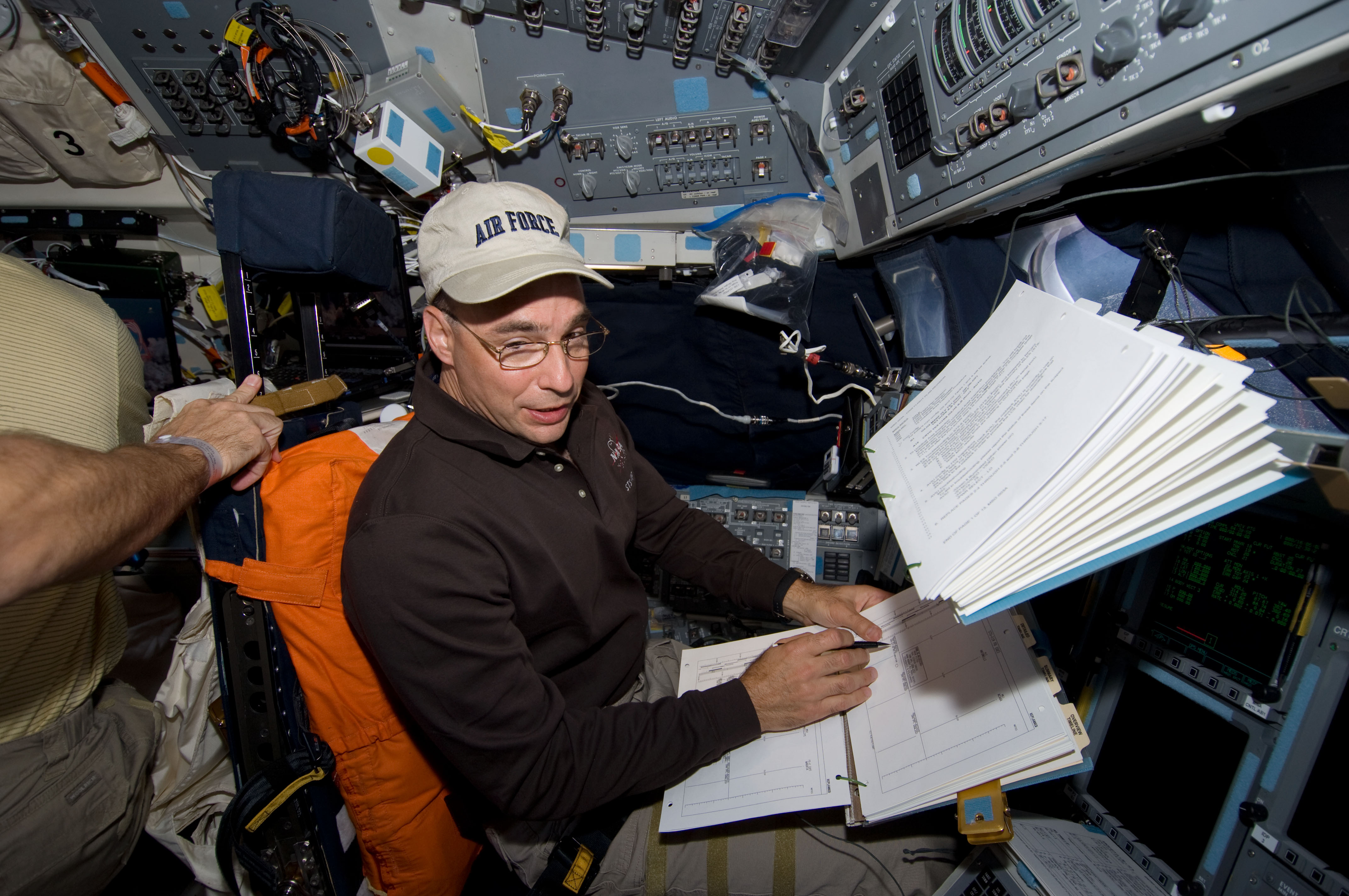
Lee Archambault going over a check list on the shuttle flight deck during STS-119

In June 1998, Archambault was selected as an astronaut candidate by NASA, and he reported for training in August 1998. In June 1999, Archambault was assigned to the Astronaut Office Shuttle Operations Branch, where he worked on flight instrument upgrades that were incorporated into the Shuttle in 2003. In September 2001, Archambault was also assigned within the Shuttle Branch to serve as an Astronaut Support Person. In this role, Archambault supported launch and landing operations at the Kennedy Space Center, and was the lead in this role for STS-111 and STS-114. Beginning in October 2004, he picked up duties as a CAPCOM and served in this role during daily orbit shifts for STS-121.

=== STS-117 ===
Archambault was the pilot for STS-117, which was the 118th mission of the Space Shuttle program. STS-117 launched on 8 June 2007 at 19:38 EDT and landed on 22 June 2007 at 15:49 EDT. The 14-day mission traveled 5.8 million miles and landed at Edwards Air Force Base, California. The mission delivered the S3/S4 truss segment to the International Space Station and swapped a long duration crew member.

=== STS-119 ===
STS-119 was Archambault's first mission as commander of a Space Shuttle. The mission delivered the final set of solar arrays to the space station, as well as long duration crew member Koichi Wakata. STS-119 was a 13-day mission which was launched on 15 March 2009, and landed at 19:43 EDT. The mission landed on 28 March 2009 at 15:13 EDT and traveled 5.3 million miles and landed at Kennedy Space Center in Florida.

=== Dream Chaser ===
On March 19, 2013, NASA announced that Archambault was leaving the agency after 15 years in order to join Sierra Nevada Corporation. Archambault will work on Sierra Nevada's Dream Chaser lifting-body spaceplane, which is being developed under NASA's Commercial Crew Development program as a potential vehicle for future crewed and uncrewed cargo missions to the International Space Station. Like the Space Shuttle, which Archambault has previously flown, Dream Chaser is designed to launch vertically and land horizontally on a runway. Unpowered drop tests of a Dream Chaser test article are planned at Edwards Air Force Base, where Archambault previously landed the Space Shuttle at the end of STS-117.

=== DeHavilland Dash 8 Turboprop ===
In early March 2019, Archambault obtained his type rating in the Bombardier Dash 8, previously known as the de Havilland Canada Dash 8 or DHC-8, a series of twin-engine, medium-range, turboprop airliners. Archambault currently flies the Dash 8 part-time.
