= Dominic A. Antonelli =

American astronaut (born 1967)

Tony Antonelli
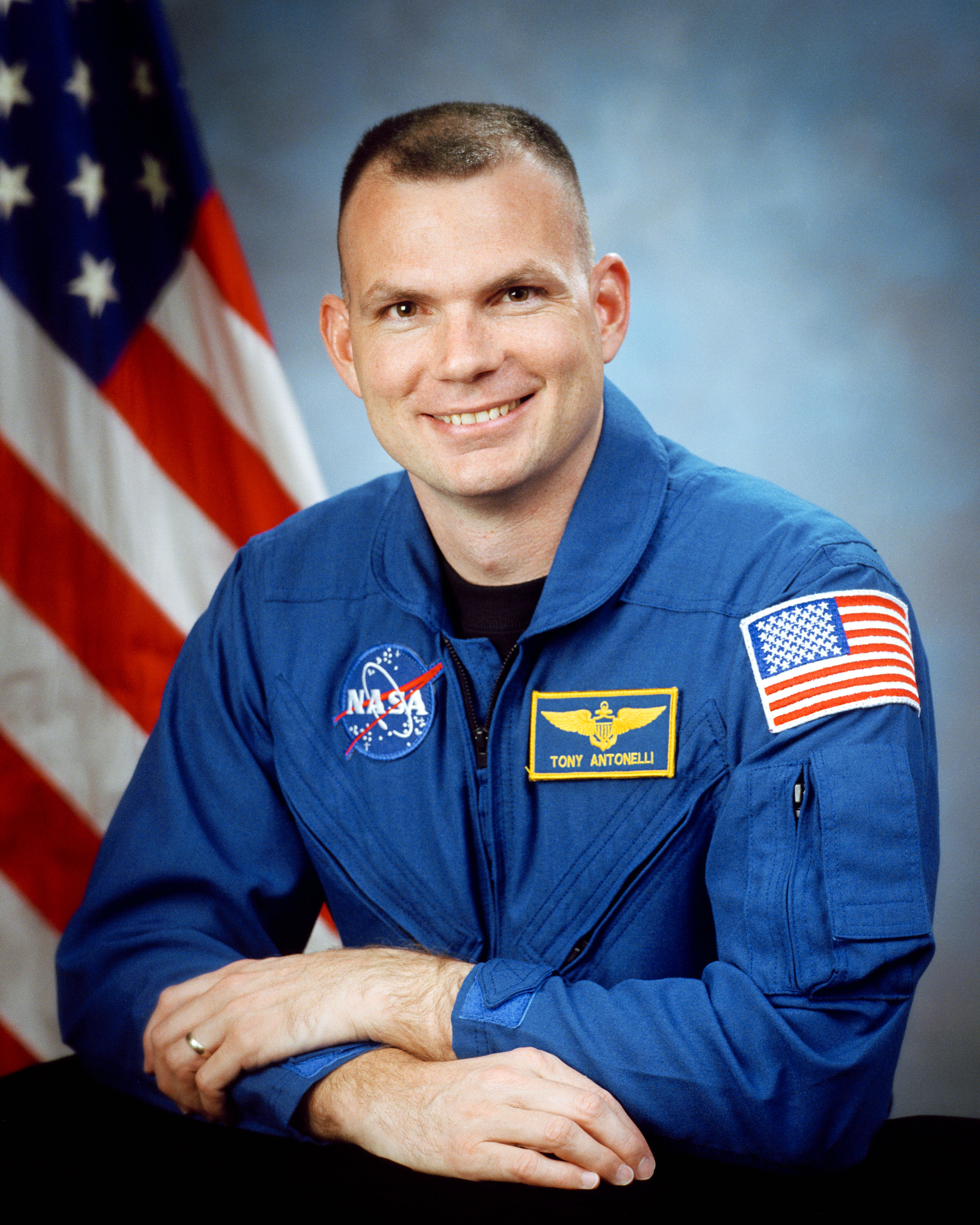
- Antonelli in November 2000
- Born: Dominic Anthony Antonelli; August 23, 1967 (age 59); Detroit, Michigan, U.S.
- Education: Massachusetts Institute of Technology (BS); University of Washington (MS)
- Space career

NASA astronaut
- Rank: Commander, USN
- Time in space: 24d 13h 58m
- Selection: NASA Group 18 (2000)
- Missions: STS-119; STS-132
- Mission insignia

Dominic Anthony "Tony" Antonelli (born August 23, 1967) is a retired NASA astronaut. Antonelli was born in Detroit, Michigan, but was raised in both Indiana and North Carolina. He is married and has two children.

== Education ==
Antonelli graduated from Douglas Byrd High School in Fayetteville, North Carolina. He went on to attend the Massachusetts Institute of Technology, where he earned a Bachelor of Science in aeronautics and astronautics. He later attended the University of Washington, earning a Master of Science in aeronautics and astronautics.

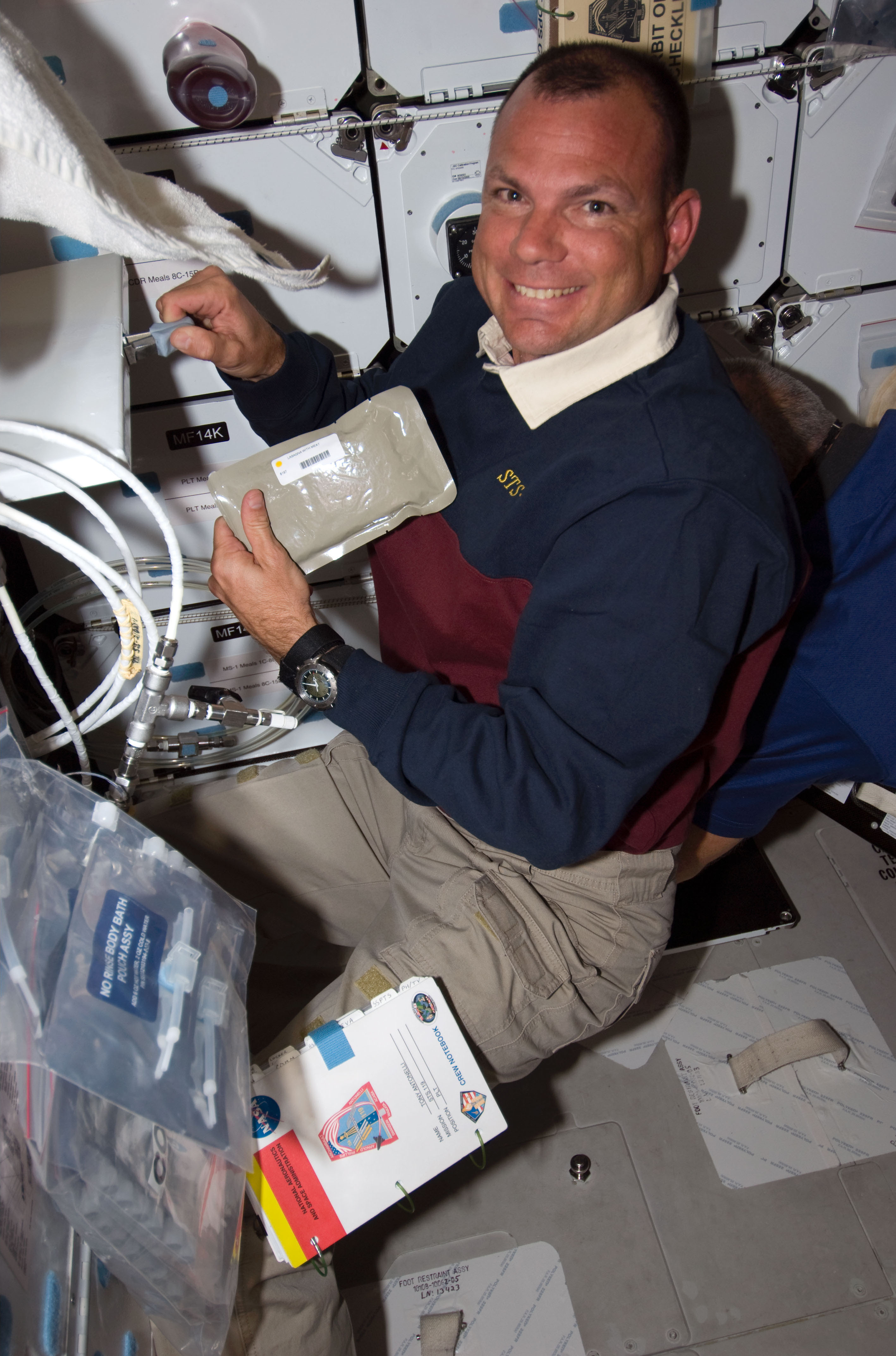
Antonelli preparing to eat during STS-119

== Military career ==
Antonelli served as a fleet Naval Aviator and Landing Signal Officer aboard the aircraft carrier USS Nimitz with the Blue Diamonds (VFA-146), flying F/A-18C Hornets in support of Operation Southern Watch.

Antonelli has accumulated over 3,200 hours in 41 different kinds of aircraft and has completed 273 carrier arrested landings. He is a Distinguished Graduate of the U.S. Air Force Test Pilot School (Navy Exchange Pilot).

== NASA career ==
Selected as an astronaut candidate by NASA in July 2000, Antonelli served in various technical assignments until his assignment to a mission. He served as pilot on the STS-119 mission which launched on March 15, 2009. The flight delivered the final pair of power-generating solar array wings and truss element to the International Space Station. Antonelli was assigned as pilot on the STS-132 mission, launched on May 14, 2010. The mission saw the delivery of the Russian Mini-Research Module 1 (MRM-1) to the International Space Station.

== Awards and honors ==
- Navy Meritorious Service Medal
- Navy Commendation Medal
- Navy Achievement Medals (2)
- Unit Battle Efficiency Awards (2)
- CVW-9 Landing Signal Officer of the Year
- NASA Exceptional Achievement Medal
- NASA Superior Accomplishment Award
- NASA Return-to-Flight Award
