= 2022 European Space Agency Astronaut Group =

Human spaceflight selection

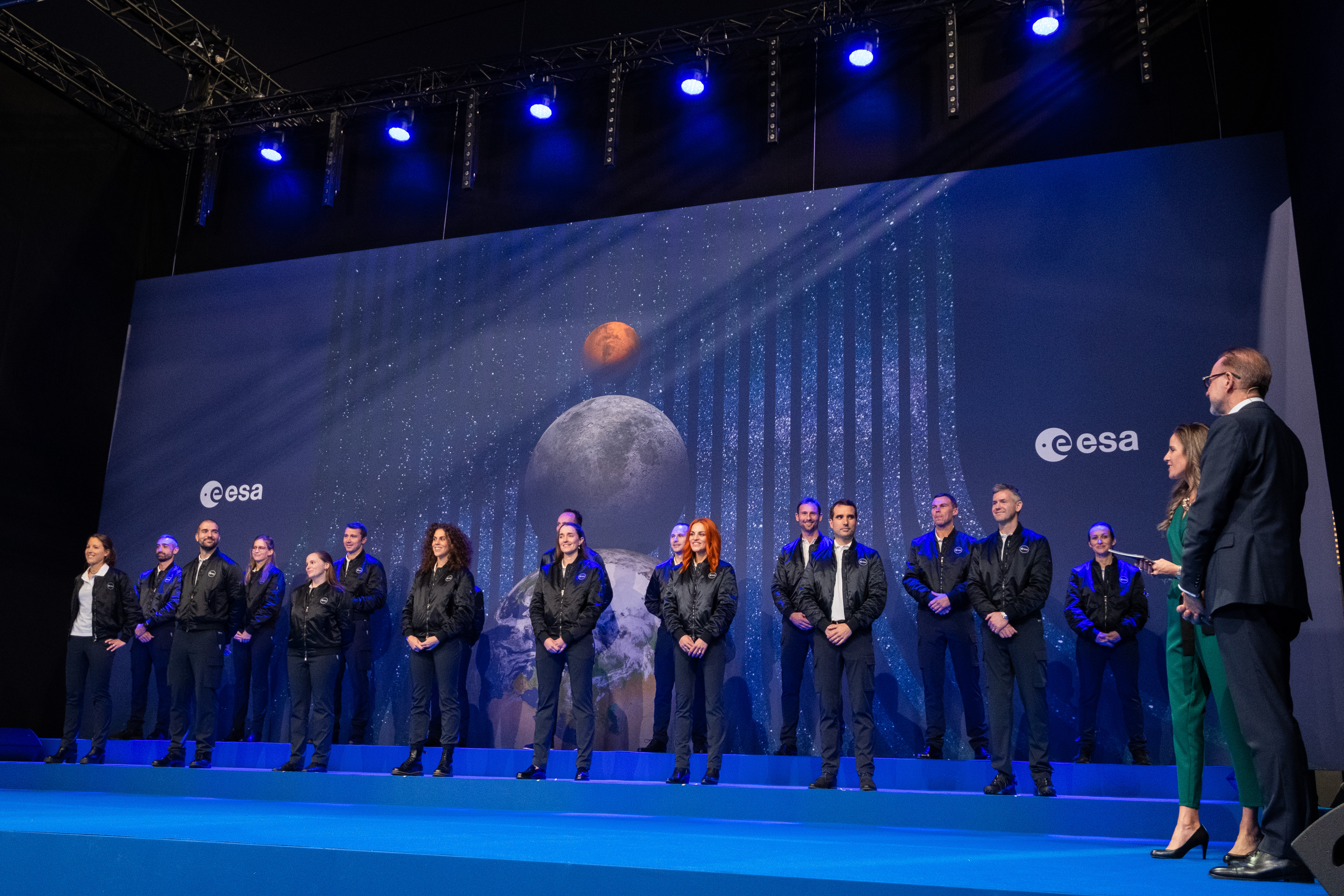
- Year selected: 2022
- Number selected: 5 career; 12 project/reserve

The 2022 European Space Agency Astronaut Group is the latest class of the European Astronaut Corps. The selection recruited five career astronauts (The Hoppers), as well as twelve reserve astronauts (The Chameleons).

They are the fourth European Space Agency (ESA) astronaut class to be recruited. The group joined the continuing corps of ESA astronauts, those selected in 2009, to perform both long and short-duration spaceflight missions aboard the International Space Station, and as part of the Artemis program.

== Group members ==
Five career astronauts were selected who, upon their graduation from basic training, were given the class name "The Hoppers". The campaign also recruited a reserve pool of astronauts who, although not employed as ESA staff would be given components of the same basic training as the career group and be available to be called upon as a project astronaut for mission assignment. Additionally, the campaign included the selection of a candidate with a physical disability through the "parastronaut feasibility project" later renamed the "Fly! feasibility study".

The announcement of the selected candidates took place in Paris on 23 November 2022 at the Grand Palais Éphémère, at the conclusion of the triennial ESA Ministerial Council meeting.

Name	Country	Type	Occupation	Flight assignments
Sophie Adenot	France	Career	Helicopter test pilot	Expedition 74/75 (SpaceX Crew-12)
Pablo Álvarez Fernández	Spain	Career	Aeronautical engineer	
Rosemary Coogan	United Kingdom	Career	Astrophysicist	
Meganne Christian	United Kingdom	Reserve	Materials scientist	
Anthea Comellini	Italy	Reserve	Aerospace engineer	
Sara García Alonso	Spain	Reserve	Biomedical scientist	
Raphaël Liégeois	Belgium	Career	Neuroscientist	Flight assigned, TBA
John McFall	United Kingdom	Project (Note: Astronaut with a disability study)	Orthopaedic surgeon	
Andrea Patassa	Italy	Reserve	Test pilot	
Carmen Possnig	Austria	Reserve	Medical doctor	
Arnaud Prost	France	Reserve	Flight test engineer	Flight assigned, Vast-1
Amelie Schoenenwald	Germany	Reserve	Immunologist	
Marco Alain Sieber	Switzerland	Career	Paratrooper and anaesthesiologist	
Aleš Svoboda	Czech Republic	Reserve	Fighter pilot	Flight assigned, Vast-PAM-1
Sławosz Uznański-Wiśniewski	Poland	Project	Radiation effects engineer	Axiom Mission 4
Marcus Wandt	Sweden	Project	Test pilot	Axiom Mission 3
Nicola Winter	Germany	Reserve	Fighter pilot	

== Chronology ==
Flights of class members
Astronaut	Date	Flight	ESA mission	Duration
Marcus Wandt	Jan–Feb 2024	Axiom Mission 3	Munnin	21 days
Sławosz Uznański-Wiśniewski	Jun–Jul 2025	Axiom Mission 4	Ignis	20 days
Sophie Adenot	Feb–Oct 2026	SpaceX Crew-12	Epsilon	237 days
Raphaël Liégeois	Late 2026 (planned)	TBD	TBD	6 months (planned)
Arnaud Prost	2027 (planned)	Vast-1	TBD	30 days (planned)
Aleš Svoboda	July 2027 (planned)	Vast-PAM-1	TBD	14 days (planned)

=== 2023 ===
Insignia of "the Hoppers"

In March 2023, the Australian Space Agency announced it would fund the training of its employee Katherine Bennell-Pegg at the European Astronaut Centre (EAC) alongside the 5 career astronauts. Basic training for some of the group began throughout 2023 at the European Astronaut Centre (EAC) facilities in Cologne, with a duration of approximately a year. The five selected "career" astronauts began in April, joined by three members of the reserve who had received "project" astronaut assignments: McFall and Wandt in June, and Uznański in September.

In August 2023 the Polish government signed an agreement with ESA and Axiom have a Polish citizen aboard a future Axiom flight. Although the agreement did not specify who would fly or when that mission would take place, the Polish minister for Economic Development and Technology stated the intent was "to submit the candidature" of Uznański for a flight in 2024.

=== 2024 ===
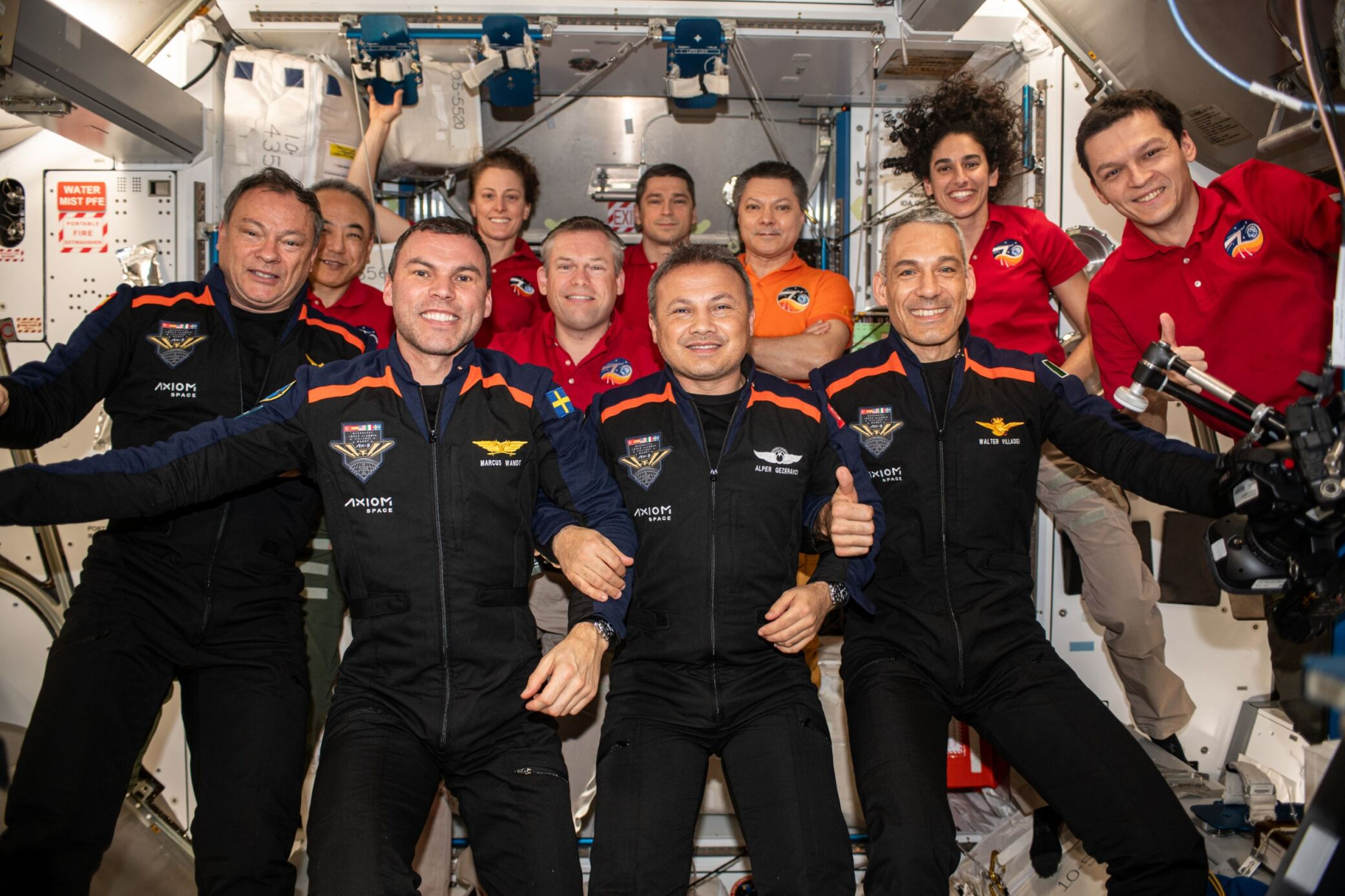
Wandt (front left) upon arrival to the ISS, 2024

After being initially announced as a reserve Marcus Wandt became the first of the class to be assigned to a spaceflight, as "mission specialist" aboard Axiom-3, to the International Space Station. It became be "the first commercial mission for an ESA-sponsored astronaut" with the Swedish National Space Agency responsible to "negotiate directly with Axiom for the flight" following ESA director general signing of letter of intent in April 2023 for such a mission. His training was performed in reverse-order to the norm, with the mission-specific content first then followed by basic training at EAC second. Wandt's mission was designated "Muninn" as it partially coincided with Danish ESA astronaut Andreas Mogensen's mission "Huginn". The Axiom-3 mission took place from 18 January to 9 February with Wandt serving as a mission specialist.

The career astronauts (as well as Bennell-Pegg) graduated from Basic Training at the European Astronaut Centre on the 22nd of April 2024 and were given the class name "The Hoppers". One month later, in the context of a meeting of the EU/ESA "Space Council" meeting held in Brussels, Adenot then Liégeois were announced as receiving the first two long duration mission assignments – both scheduled in that order for 2026.

In August, it was confirmed that Uznański was assigned on Axiom-4, scheduled for 2025 and immediately began his mission training. In September was announced that all the reserves (other than Wandt and Uznański) would receive "selected modules of ESA’s one-year basic training programme", to be conducted in three blocks of two-month duration over the next two years – with the first beginning the following month.

=== 2025 ===
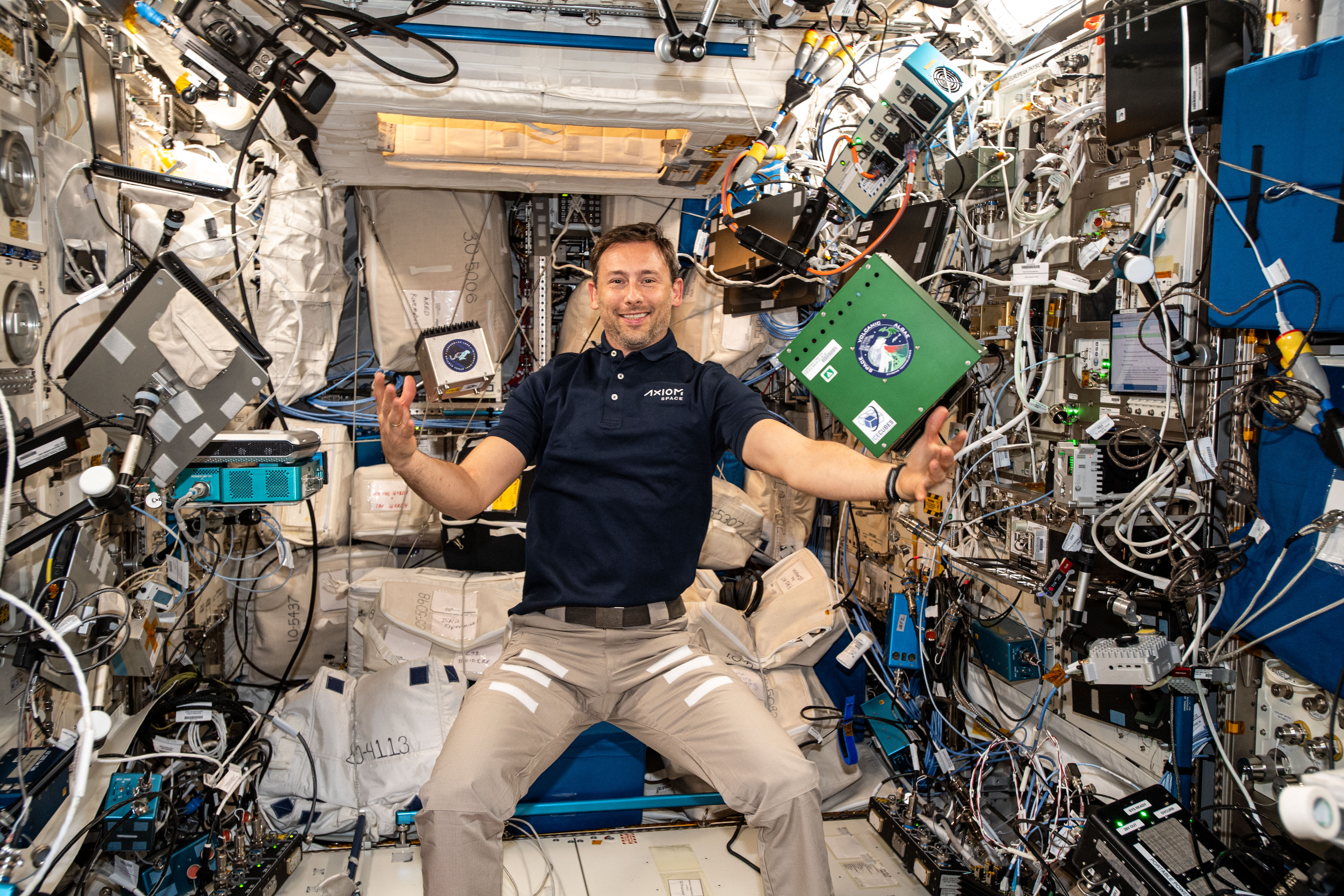
Uznański in the Columbus module, 2025

After several launch delays, the Axiom-4 mission took place from 25 June to 15 July, with Uznański's mission named "Ignis". Adenot's mission was announced as being designated "Epsilon" (stylised as εpsilon).

=== 2026 ===
Adenot and SpaceX Crew-12 were launched on 13 February 2026 during which time she performed three EVAs, the first French woman to do so. The mission concluded after 8 months, departing upon the arrival of SpaceX Crew-13 in October.

In June, private space company VAST announced two of the reserve corps would be participating in future missions: Prost was announced as the first confirmed member of the Vast-1 mission crew, which would inaugurate the new commercially operated Haven-1 space station, and Svoboda would join the Vast-PAM-1 mission to the ISS.

On 12 November the reserve group graduated their training program an were given the class name "The Chameleons".

== Recruitment ==
ESA press conferences
- Recruitment campaign launch – English, French, German, Italian, Dutch, Spanish. 16 February 2021

The recruitment campaign was announced at press conferences in February 2021. Applications for the roles of "astronaut" and "astronaut (with a physical disability)" in the ESA Directorate of Human and Robotic Exploration Programmes were accepted between 31 March and 18 June of that year and over 22 thousand applications were received. The original deadline of May 28 was extended by three weeks due to Lithuania joining ESA as an associate-member of ESA, and its citizens therefore becoming eligible to apply, only a week before the original deadline.

=== Criteria ===
Recruits could be a citizen of any ESA member or associate-member state. (Note: At the time, ESA members nations were: Austria, Belgium, the Czech Republic, Denmark, Estonia, Finland, France, Germany, Greece, Hungary, Ireland, Italy, Luxembourg, the Netherlands, Norway, Poland, Portugal, Romania, Spain, Sweden, Switzerland, and the United Kingdom. Associate-members were Slovenia, Latvia, and Lithuania.) Women were particularly encouraged to apply — in order to address the gender gap among astronauts — as under 16% of applicants in the previous recruitment campaign were women.

The minimum formal criteria included: being a citizen of an ESA member (or associate member) state under the age of 50; being between 150 and 190 cm tall (with possible exception under the astronaut with a disability category); a "normal weight" BMI range; fluency in English and another language; a master's degree in the Natural Sciences, Medicine, Engineering, Mathematics/Computer Sciences (plus three years of professional experience), or accreditation as an experimental test pilot; a "hearing capacity of 25 dB or better per ear"; and a current class 2 pilot's medical certificate. Upon selection, recruits would then receive training in "...the essentials of being an astronaut, survival skills and the Russian language, before moving on to robotics, navigation, maintenance and spacewalks", and then receiving mission-specific training.

The types of disability considered for astronaut with a disability program were lower limb deficiency (e.g. due to amputation or congenital limb deficiency), leg length difference, or short stature.

=== Applicants ===
Applications from 22,523 candidates were received. They came from all eligible nationalities (including Lithuania), as well as 257 for the astronaut with a disability program. This represented a 2.8x increase in the number of applications received compared to the previous ESA astronaut selection process. Almost five and a half thousand applicants (24%) were women – up from 1287 (15.3%) female applicants in the previous selection process. Estonia had the highest proportion of female applicants (38.6%), while Switzerland had the lowest (17.8%).

With over seven thousand applications the largest number of applicants were French citizens, almost twice as many as the next most common applicant citizenship, Germans. It was speculated that the popularity of the call for applicants among French citizens was due to Thomas Pesquet's "Alpha" mission to the ISS beginning while the application period was open. More than a thousand applications were also received from British, Spanish, Italian and Belgian citizens, while less than 100 applications were received from Estonians, Latvians, Lithuanians, Luxembourgers, and Slovenians. ESA stressed that the eventual selection is "irrespective" of national funding of the organisation.

Applicants by citizenship (Note: While many applicants hold multiple citizenships, for statistical purposes ESA categorises them according to their self-declared first citizenship.) (% Female Applicant)
Austria	Belgium	Czech Republic	Denmark	Estonia
466 (24.9%)	1,007 (22.8%)	204 (18.1%)	145 (24.1%)	57 (38.6%)
Finland	France	Germany	Greece	Hungary
308 (18.8%)	7,087 (23.2%)	3,695 (28%)	281 (21.4%)	149 (22.8%)
Ireland (Republic of Ireland)	Italy	Latvia	Lithuania	Luxembourg
276 (28.3%)	1,845 (18.8%)	83 (27.7%)	80 (23.8%)	64 (18.8%)
The Netherlands	Norway	Poland	Portugal	Romania
982 (30.1%)	391 (17.9%)	549 (23.3%)	320 (19.1%)	254 (21.7%)
Slovenia	Spain	Sweden	Switzerland	United Kingdom
62 (21%)	1,341 (22.2%)	281 (18.1%)	668 (17.8%)	2,000 (28.5%)

=== Selection process ===
Announcement of ESA's new class of astronauts

The selection process itself proceeds over six stages:

1. Screening of applicants was undertaken "on the basis of documents submitted, the application form and the screening questionnaire." It was initially expected that approximately 1,500 (7%) applicants would be accepted through to stage 2. By the conclusion of the 1st stage in January 2022, 1,361 astronaut candidates and 27 disabled candidates were invited to the 2nd stage – including at least one man and one woman from every eligible nationality.
2. Initial tests consisted of "cognitive, technical, motor coordination and personality tests" administered by the German Aerospace Center in Hamburg.
3. Assessment centre evaluation involved "additional psychometric tests, individual and group exercises and practical tests" administered at the European Astronaut Centre in Cologne.
4. Medical tests assessed "physical and psychological condition in view of long-duration astronaut missions" administered in Cologne and the Toulouse Space Centre, France.
5. Panel interview assesses "technical and behavioural competencies" including a background check.
6. Final interview with the ESA Director General at the agency headquarters in Paris.

Selection process statistics
Recruitment round		Applicants (of which disab.)	Completed	% Female	% of previous	Ref.
Screening		22,780 (257)	June 2021	24%	—N/a	
Initial tests		1,388 (27)	March 2022	39%	6%	
Assessment centre evaluation		~400	May 2022		~29%	
Medical tests		91	June 2022		~25%	
Final interview		25	October 2022	40%+	27%	
Selection	Career	5	November 2022	40%	20%	
Selection	Reserve/Project	12 (1)	November 2022	50%	48%	

== See also ==
- List of astronauts by year of selection
