= Sławosz Uznański-Wiśniewski =

Polish astronaut and engineer

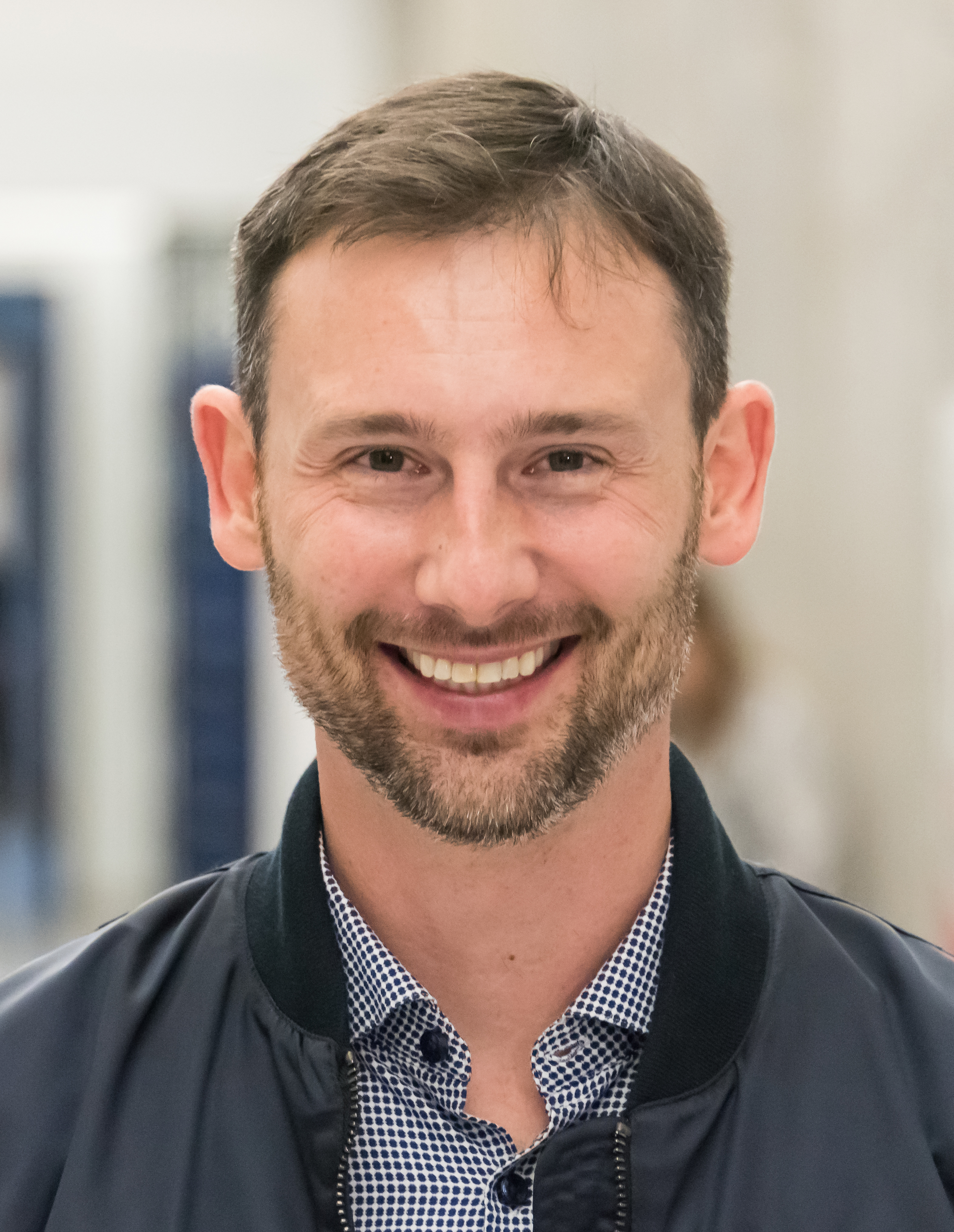
- Uznański-Wiśniewski in 2023
- Born: Sławosz Uznański; 12 April 1984 (age 42); Łódź, Polish People's Republic
- Education: Łódź University of Technology (M.Sc.Eng.); University of Nantes (M.Sc.); Polytech Nantes (Dipl.Ing.); Aix-Marseille University (PhD)
- Spouse: Aleksandra Uznańska-Wiśniewska (m. 2025)
- Call sign: Suave
- Space career

ESA astronaut
- Previous occupation: Engineer in Charge of the Large Hadron Collider, CERN
- Time in space: 20 days, 2 hours and 59 minutes
- Selection: 2022 ESA Group
- Missions: Axiom Mission 4

Sławosz Uznański-Wiśniewski (Polish pronunciation: [ˈswa.vɔʂ uzˈnaɲ.ski viɕˈɲɛf.ski]; né Uznański; born 12 April 1984) is a Polish astronaut and engineer working at the European Space Agency (ESA), formerly employed at CERN. In June 2025, he became the second (Note: The first Pole in space was the Polish cosmonaut Mirosław Hermaszewski, who in June 1978 flew aboard Soyuz 30 with Soviet Belarusian cosmonaut Pyotr Klimuk to the Salyut 6 space station as part of the Interkosmos programme.) Polish national to go to space, marking the country's return to crewed spaceflight after nearly 47 years and its first mission aboard the International Space Station. He was the 701st person in space and the 635th person to reach orbital flight.

== Early life and education ==
Sławosz was born in Łódź, at that time the Polish People's Republic (PRL), on 12 April 1984 to art historian parents Piotr Uznański and Maja Marquardt-Uznańska. The day of his birth fell on the 23rd anniversary of the first human orbital spaceflight. Every birthday, Uznański's mother would wish him "all the best wishes on Cosmonaut Day". Growing up in the 1980s, after Mirosław Hermaszewski's spaceflight in 1978, Uznański's childhood dream was to go to space. In his teenage years, he was on the Polish national sailing team.

Uznański was raised in Łódź, attending the Adam Asnyk 8th General Education High School. He was a member of the 24th Łódź Scouting Group "Ilczi" of the Polish Scouting and Guiding Association. In 2008, he graduated with honours with master's degree from the Łódź University of Technology and from the University of Nantes; in the same year, he also received a engineer diploma from the Polytech Nantes. At that point he was already following ESA's recruitment process and began preparing for it, but was too young to apply himself in 2008. In 2011, he received a doctor's degree with distinction from the University of the Mediterranean Aix-Marseille II for his thesis on radiation-tolerant designs for space applications.

== Career and ESA ==
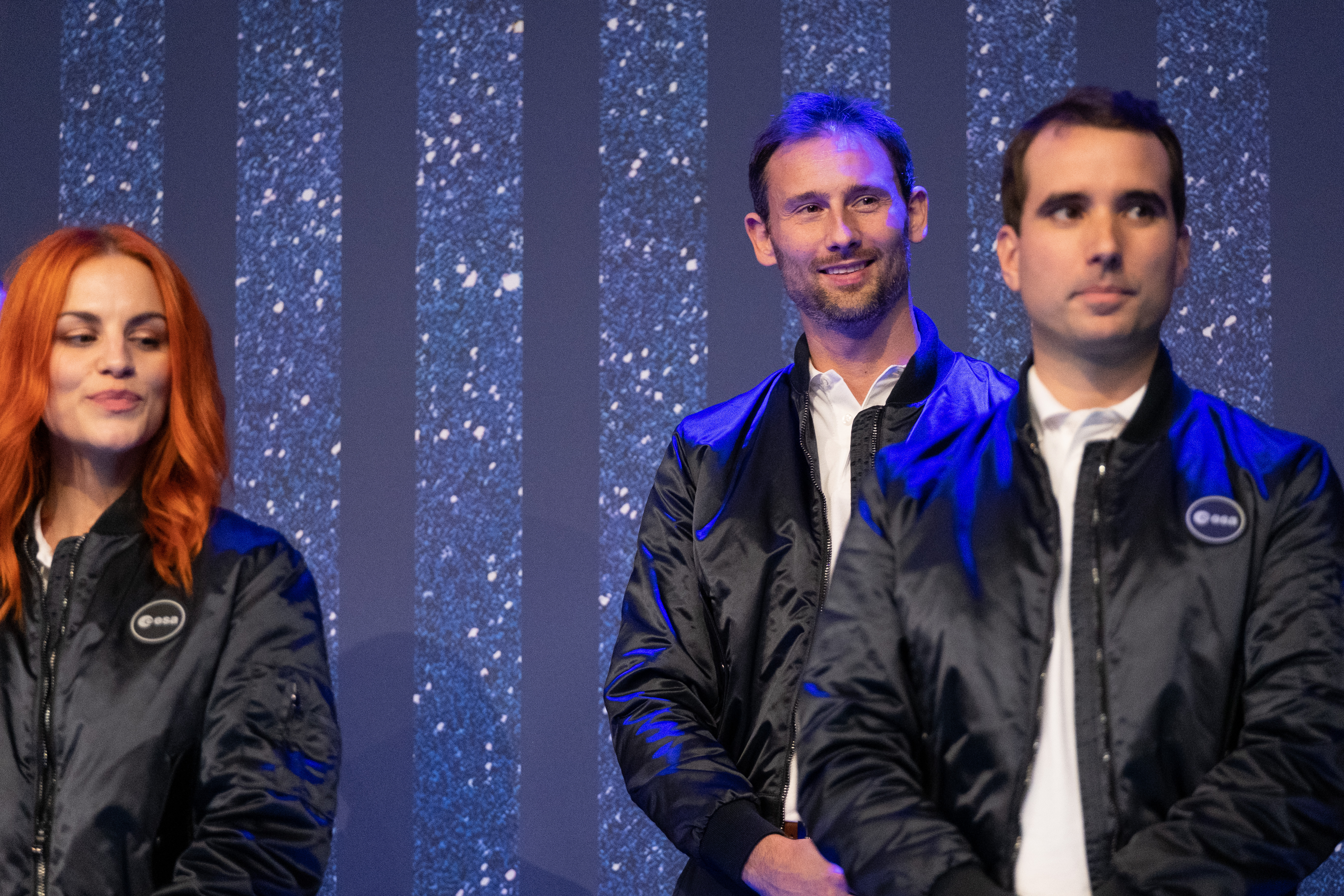
Sara García Alonso, Uznański, and Raphaël Liégeois at the ESA astronaut announcement Class of 2022 in Paris

During his doctorate, Uznański worked at the STMicroelectronics manufacturing facility in Crolles, France. In 2011, he joined the European Organization for Nuclear Research (CERN) in Geneva, Switzerland. In 2013, he was appointed as a project lead and senior reliability engineer at CERN. Since 2014, he was a volunteer reviewing many commercial satellite projects, such as ICEYE and Polish space missions like PW-Sat2, HyperSat, and EagleEye. From 2018 to 2020, he was an Engineer in Charge of the Large Hadron Collider. In 2019, he was a technical expert and reviewer for the Horizon 2020 programme; investigating European autonomy and technological competitiveness in the space industry for the European Research Executive Agency (REA).

In November 2022, he was announced as one of 11 reserve astronauts by the European Astronaut Corps for the 2022 European Space Agency Astronaut Group from a pool of over 22,500 applicants. In an interview, Uznański revealed that Mirosław Hermaszewski (Poland's first cosmonaut) supported him throughout the process and was the first person to call him with congratulations on the morning after he was selected.

In August 2023, Poland's Development and Technology Minister, Waldemar Buda, announced that a Polish astronaut would fly to the International Space Station (ISS) in 2024, adding that if the mission went ahead Poland would submit the candidature of Uznański, which in turn would have to be approved by the ESA and the American company Axiom Space. Uznański was accepted and set to become the second Pole to go to space after Mirosław Hermaszewski's 1978 flight with Soyuz 30. His intensive preparation programme with ESA, NASA, SpaceX, and JAXA took him to training centres in several countries.

== Axiom and Ignis ==
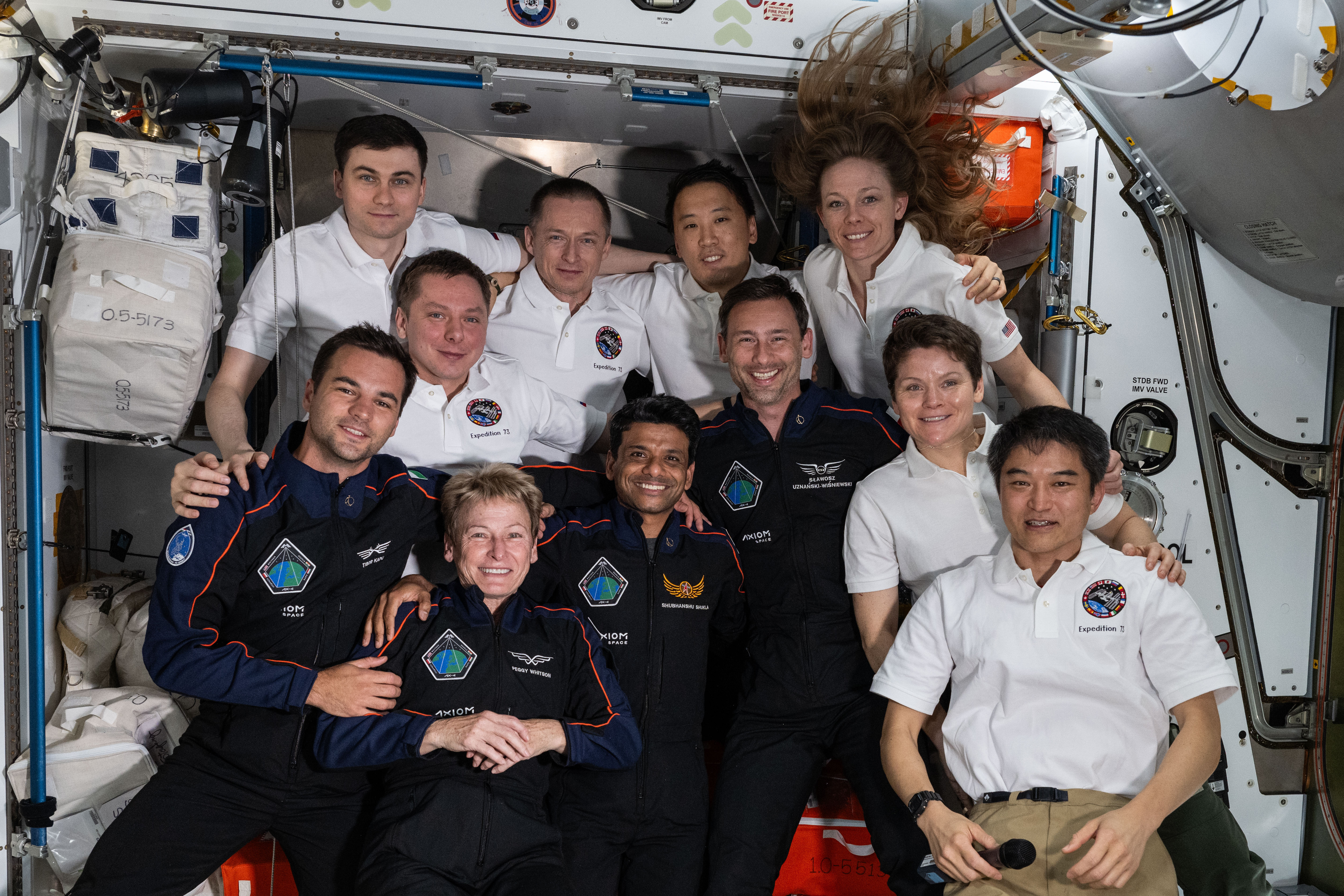
Axiom Mission 4 crew in black jumpsuits, from left: Kapu, Whitson, Shukla, and Uznański-Wiśniewski with Expedition 73 crew in white shirts on 28 June 2025

Uznański joined the ESA to undergo his training for Axiom Mission 4 (Ax-4) on 1 September 2023. It was expected to launch no earlier than April 2025. On board the Crew Dragon that would take the mission to the ISS, Uznański would bring the same Polish flag that flew to space in 1978 attached to Hermaszewski's spacesuit as well as the Polish national dish of pierogi (prepared in lyophilised form by Polish chef Mateusz Gessler). Uznański's POLSA mission is named Ignis. Andrzej Pągowski, who designed a poster for Hermaszewski's 1978 spaceflight, created a new poster for the Ignis mission that was also taken by Uznański-Wiśniewski to be presented aboard the ISS. The astronaut also took to space with him a piece of Baltic amber from Sobieszewo Island and his scouting krajka.

As "Mission Specialist 1", Uznański joined Commander Peggy Whitson of the United States, Pilot Shubhanshu Shukla of India, and Mission Specialist 2 Tibor Kapu of Hungary as a crew member of the SpaceX Dragon 2 spacecraft. The Axiom 4 flight was delayed several times between May and June 2025 for a number of reasons, including unfavourable weather, excessively strong winds in the upper parts of the atmosphere within the flight corridor of the rocket, problems with the Dragon capsule, and a fuel leak detected only a several dozen hours before one of the planned start dates on 10 June. The flight dates were originally planned for 29 May, 8 June, 10 June, 12 June, 18 June, and 22 June 2025. The astronauts spent one and a half months in quarantine before lift-off. The mission was pushed back once more to 25 June 2025 and ultimately successfully launched from LC-39A at 6:31 am UTC (2:31 am EDT) on that day.

Sławosz Uznański-Wiśniewski's first words from orbit

Travelling with the speed of 27,000 km/h (16,777 mph) at an altitude of 200 kilometres, Uznański-Wiśniewski delivered the following address to the Polish nation:

"Dear Poles, (Note: In Polish, the nouns Polak (plural: Polacy) and Polka (plural: Polki) are respectively the masculine and feminine words for a Polish person. Thus, by starting his speech with Drogie Polki i Polacy, Uznański-Wiśniewski began with an address to Polish women and men.) today we are taking a huge step towards the technological future of Poland. A Poland based on science, knowledge, and vision. Let this mission be the beginning of an era in which our courage and tenacity shape modern Poland. For us and for future generations. The cosmos has always united people. Today from Earth I am taking a part of each of you. Your strength and your hope, your trust. In space I am not alone, I represent us all. I thank you with all my heart for your trust. Space for everyone." (Note: Original quote: "Drogie Polki i Polacy, dziś robimy ogromny krok w stronę przyszłości technologicznej Polski. Polski opartej na nauce, wiedzy i wizji. Niech ta misja będzie początkiem epoki, w której nasza odwaga i nieustępliwość kształtują nowoczesną Polskę. Dla nas i dla przyszłych pokoleń. Kosmos zawsze jednoczył ludzi. Zabieram dziś z Ziemi cząstkę każdego z Was. Waszej siły i waszej nadziei, waszego zaufania. W kosmosie nie jestem sam, reprezentuję nas wszystkich. Z całego serca dziękuję Wam za zaufanie. Kosmos dla wszystkich. Space for everyone.")

— Sławosz Uznański-Wiśniewski, aboard Crew Dragon Grace, on 25 June 2025, ~11 minutes into the flight

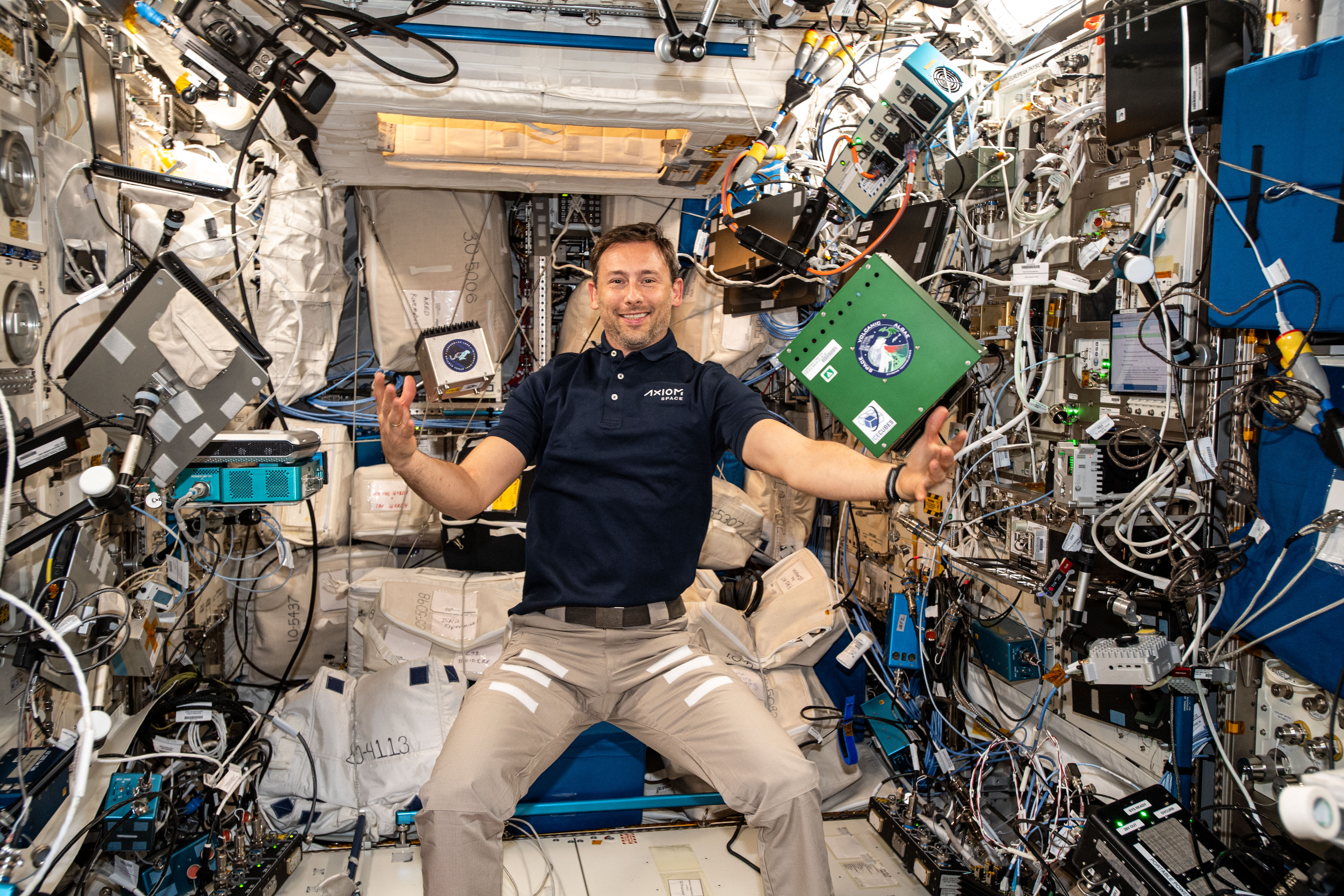
Sławosz inside the Columbus laboratory module of the ISS, June 2025

Following a 28-hour rendezvous, Ax-4 docked with the ISS at 10:31 am UTC (6:31 am EDT) on 26 June, 2025. Hatches were opened at 12:14 am UTC (8:14 am EDT), allowing Uznański-Wiśniewski and his crew mates to be formally welcomed onto the station. With their arrival, the ISS crew of Expedition 73 grew to 11 astronauts from 6 different countries. During the welcoming ceremony, Uznański-Wiśniewski received a badge that signified he was the 635th person to reach orbital flight. When handed the microphone, he stressed the importance of the experimental side of the mission. His sleeping quarters were located in the ESA's Columbus module.

On board the ISS, Uznański-Wiśniewski and his peers were set to take part in 60 experiments evaluated by researchers from 31 countries. 13 of those were proposed and developed by Polish companies, research institutes, and universities. Among others, these include: tests of advanced artificial intelligence algorithms in microgravity conditions, research on muscle-free communication using brainwaves, analysis of the impact of long-term stays in space on the astronaut's mental health, measurements of noise levels on the ISS and its impact on the crew, as well as research on the use of microalgae in future missions and in space medicine. Six direct calls between Uznański-Wiśniewski and Polish schoolchildren, journalists, and special guests were planned along with a programme of interviews and experiments, including 30 educational demonstrations.

Sławosz and his Ax-4 crew mates spent 18 days on the ISS, together carrying out over 60 research activities and taking part in more than 20 outreach events, before undocking from the station on 14 July, 2025. The next day, the crewed capsule splashed down in the Pacific Ocean off San Diego on 9:32 am UTC (5:32 am EDT), ending their mission after more than 20 days in space on Tuesday, 15 July, 2025. Uznański-Wiśniewski underwent rehabilitation at the European Astronaut Centre near Cologne in Germany.

== Personal life ==
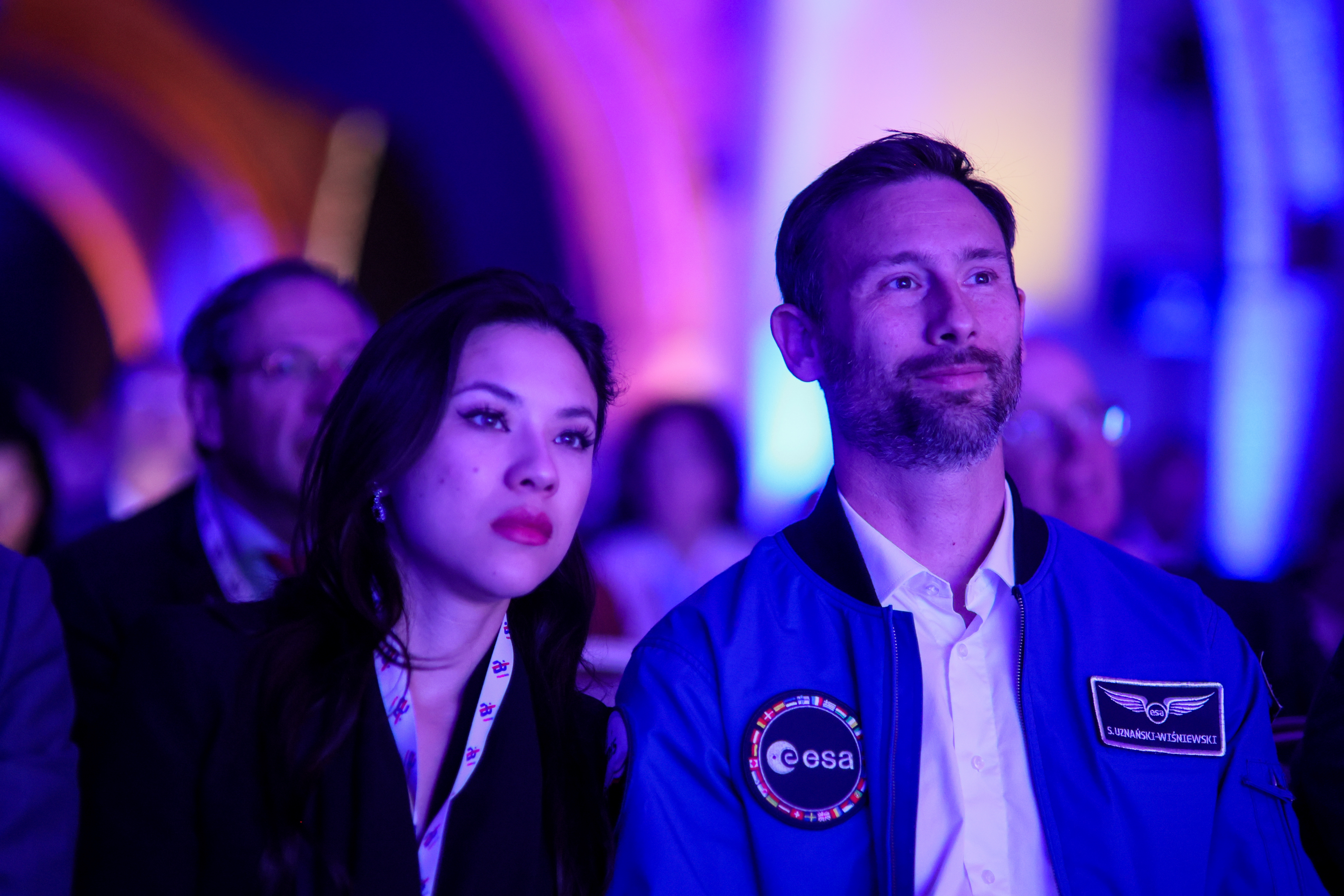
The Uznańscy-Wiśniewscy at the 3rd ESA Security Conference in the Royal Castle of Warsaw, Poland, April 2025

Uznański-Wiśniewski speaks Polish, English, and French. In his spare time, he enjoys exploring the world through high-altitude mountaineering expeditions, trips to remote areas of the planet, and sailing escapades. He has a younger brother called Mikołaj Uznański. Prior to his first spaceflight, Sławosz had authored a book on the effects of radiation in electronic systems and co-authored over 50 articles in journals and at scientific conferences.

In January 2025, Sławosz Uznański married Aleksandra Wiśniewska, a politician, political scientist, humanitarian, and social activist. The couple took on the double-barrelled surname of Uznańscy-Wiśniewscy. (Note: Polish is a language with grammatical gender. Uznańscy-Wiśniewscy is the plural of the surname, whereas Uznański-Wiśniewski is the masculine singular form and Uznańska-Wiśniewska the feminine.) Their wedding bands, made of meteorite and a bullet from Aleksandra's humanitarian missions, were taken by Sławosz to space. Aleksandra, Sławosz's parents Piotr and Maja, as well as his brother Mikołaj all travelled to be present for his lift-off at the Ax-4 mission launch site in Merritt Island, Florida.

== Cultural significance ==
- Anticipating the second Polish crewed spaceflight, the Silesian–Dąbrowa Bridge in Warsaw was illuminated with blue light. Similar events took place in other parts of Poland, such as Gdynia, where the Emigration Museum was also illuminated in blue.
- In June 2025, Łódź artists Marcin Pryt and Grzegorz Fajngold, playing as the band Maszynowa, created the song Kosmos dla wszystkich ("Cosmos for everyone") to commemorate Uznański-Wiśniewski's flight. The track was recorded on the day of Axiom 4 mission's lift-off.
- The fact that Uznański-Wiśniewski took to space pierogi made by a Kielce-based company was honoured in August 2025 through the Misja pierogi: z Kielc do kosmosu ("Mission pierogi: from Kielce to the cosmos") mural on the wall of the Poczta Polska (Polish mail service) building in Kielce. The mural, painted by a team led by Małgorzata Warsiewicz, was positively received by the locals.

== Honours and awards ==
- Jubilee medal for the 600th anniversary of Łódź, given in 2023 to distinguished persons from the city
- ESA Astronaut Wings in 2023
- Universal Astronaut Insignia for orbital flight 635 – awarded in 2025 by the Association of Space Explorers
- Honorary Citizenship of Łódź

== See also ==
- Mirosław Hermaszewski, first Polish cosmonaut in space
- Zenon Jankowski, Hermaszewski's reserve for Soyuz 30
