= Carmen Possnig =

Austrian physician and reserve astronaut

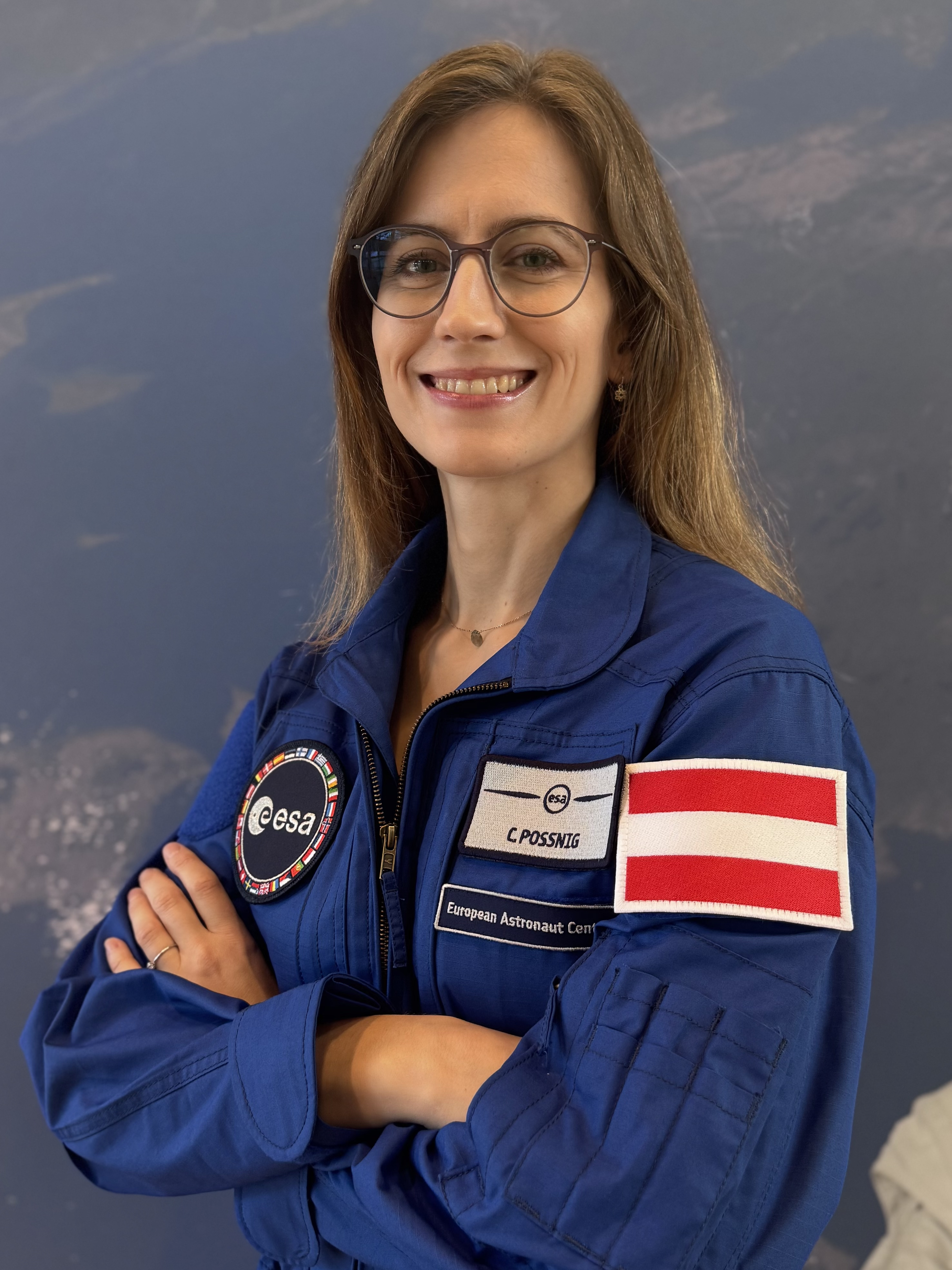
- Possnig in 2025
- Born: 1988 (age 37–38); Klagenfurt, Austria
- Education: Medical University of Graz
- Occupation: Physician
- Space career

ESA reserve astronaut
- Selection: 2022 ESA Group

Carmen Possnig (born 1988) is an Austrian physician and European Space Agency reserve astronaut. After graduating from the Medical University of Graz in 2014, Possnig was a general practitioner resident in Vienna for a few years before working as a research medical doctor at Concordia Station in Antarctica for more than a year starting in 2017. Since 2020, she has been a doctoral student in space physiology at the University of Innsbruck. She was chosen as a reserve in the European Astronaut Corps in 2022.

== Early life and education ==
Possnig was born in Klagenfurt, Austria, in 1988. She completed her studies at the Medical University of Graz in 2014. Her thesis, on the "Effects of Artificial Gravity Exposure on Orthostatic Tolerance Times in Men and Women", was written with the German Aerospace Center and supervised by professors Nandu Goswami and Helmut Hinghofer-Szalkay.

== Medical career ==
Possnig was a resident physician at the Vienna Associated Hospitals from 2014 to 2017, during which she received a diploma and certification for general practice. She spent 13 months in 2017 and 2018 as a research medical doctor at Concordia Station in Antarctica, where she led the medical rescue team and conducted studies for the European Space Agency on how the human body adapts to extreme environment of the South Pole. She wrote a book on her experience working in Antarctica, titled "Südlich vom Ende der Welt" ("South of the End of the World"), published by Ludwig Buchverlag in 2020. She began a PhD at the University of Innsbruck focused on space physiology in 2020 and in 2022 became a research medical doctor at the Medes Institute for Space Medicine and Physiology in Toulouse, France.

== Astronaut career ==
The European Space Agency selected Possnig as a reserve astronaut for the 2022 selection of astronauts of the European Astronaut Corps. There were more than 22,500 applicants to the new class of astronauts. If chosen to carry out a space mission, Possnig would become the first Austrian woman to fly in space.
