= European Astronaut Corps =

Unit of the European Space Agency providing astronauts on US and Russian missions

The European Astronaut Corps is a unit of the European Space Agency (ESA) that selects, trains, and provides astronauts as crew members on U.S. and Russian space missions. The corps has 13 active members, able to serve on the International Space Station (ISS). The European Astronaut Corps is based at the European Astronaut Centre in Cologne, Germany. They can be assigned to various projects both in Europe (at ESTEC, for instance) or elsewhere in the world, at Johnson Space Center or Star City.

== History ==
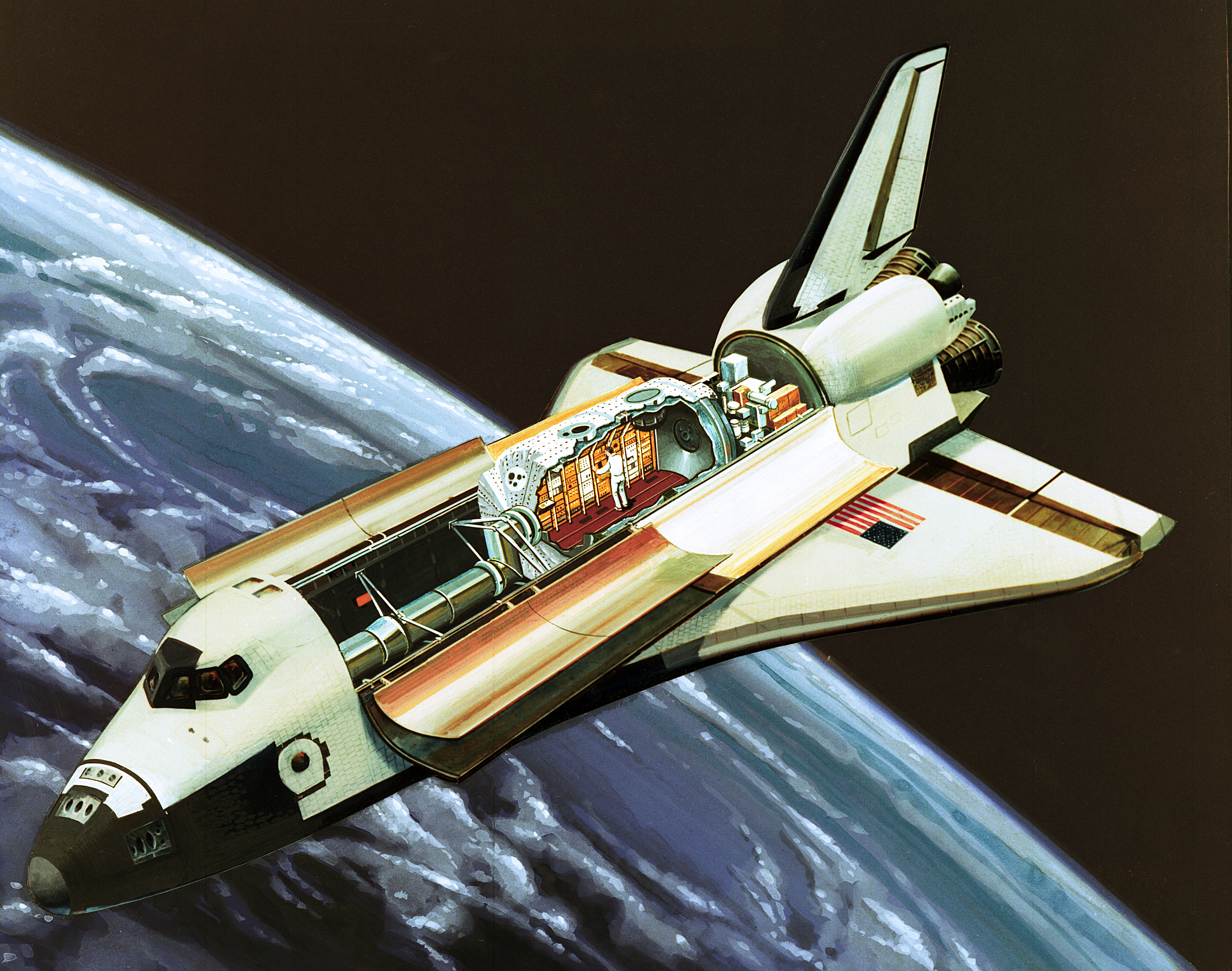
Spacelab, artist's concept

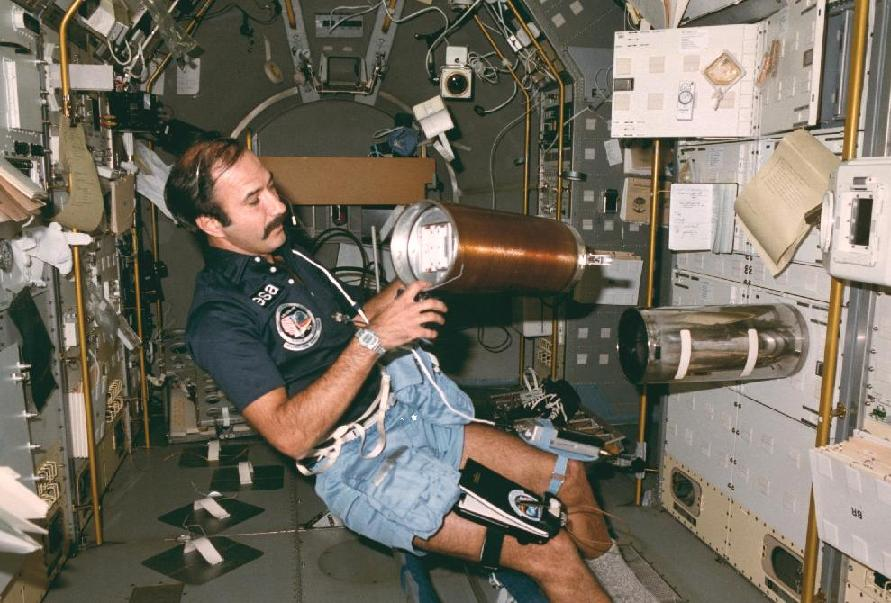
Wubbo Ockels in the Spacelab, 1985

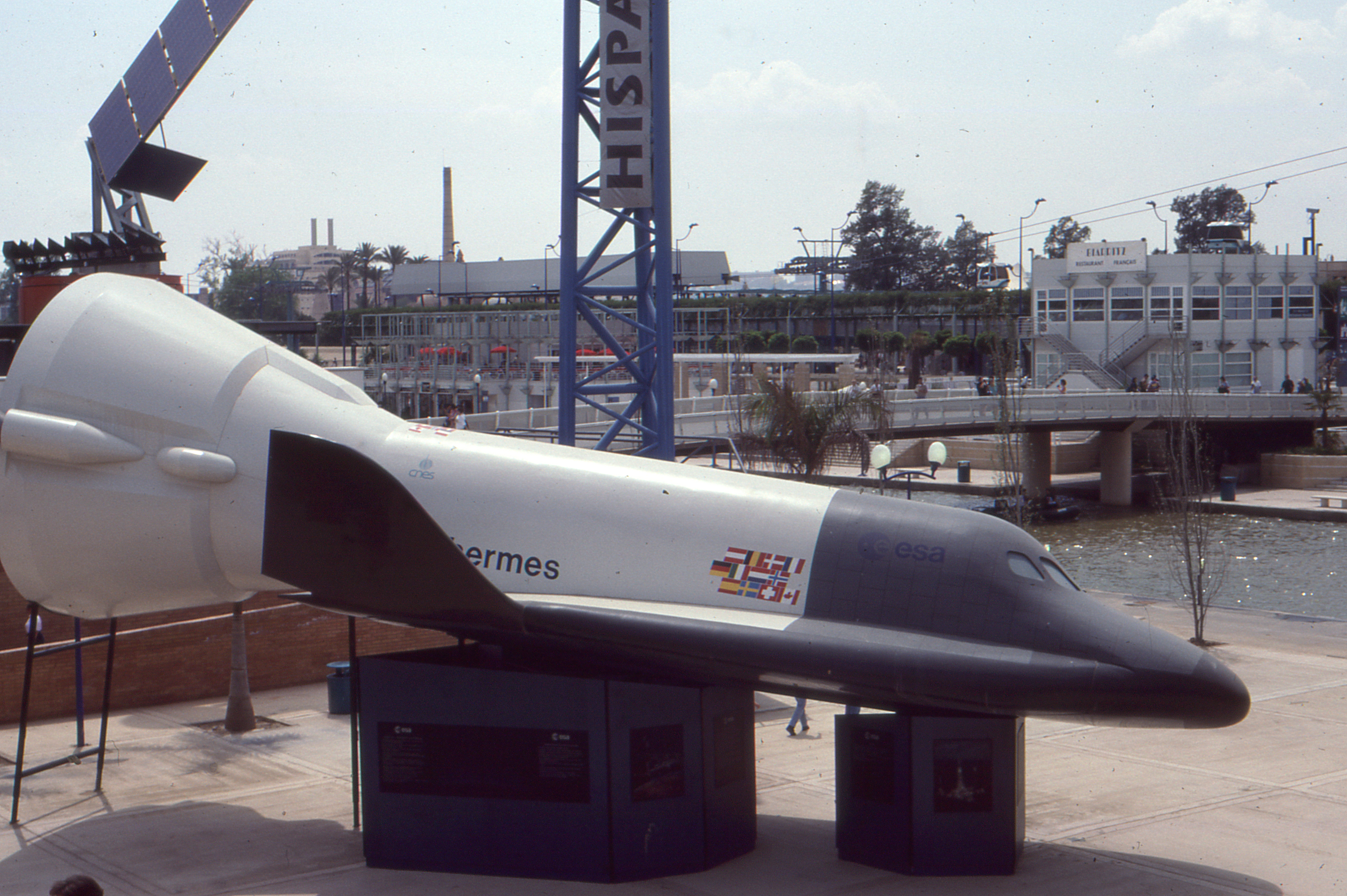
Hermes mockup on display during the Sevilla Expo 92

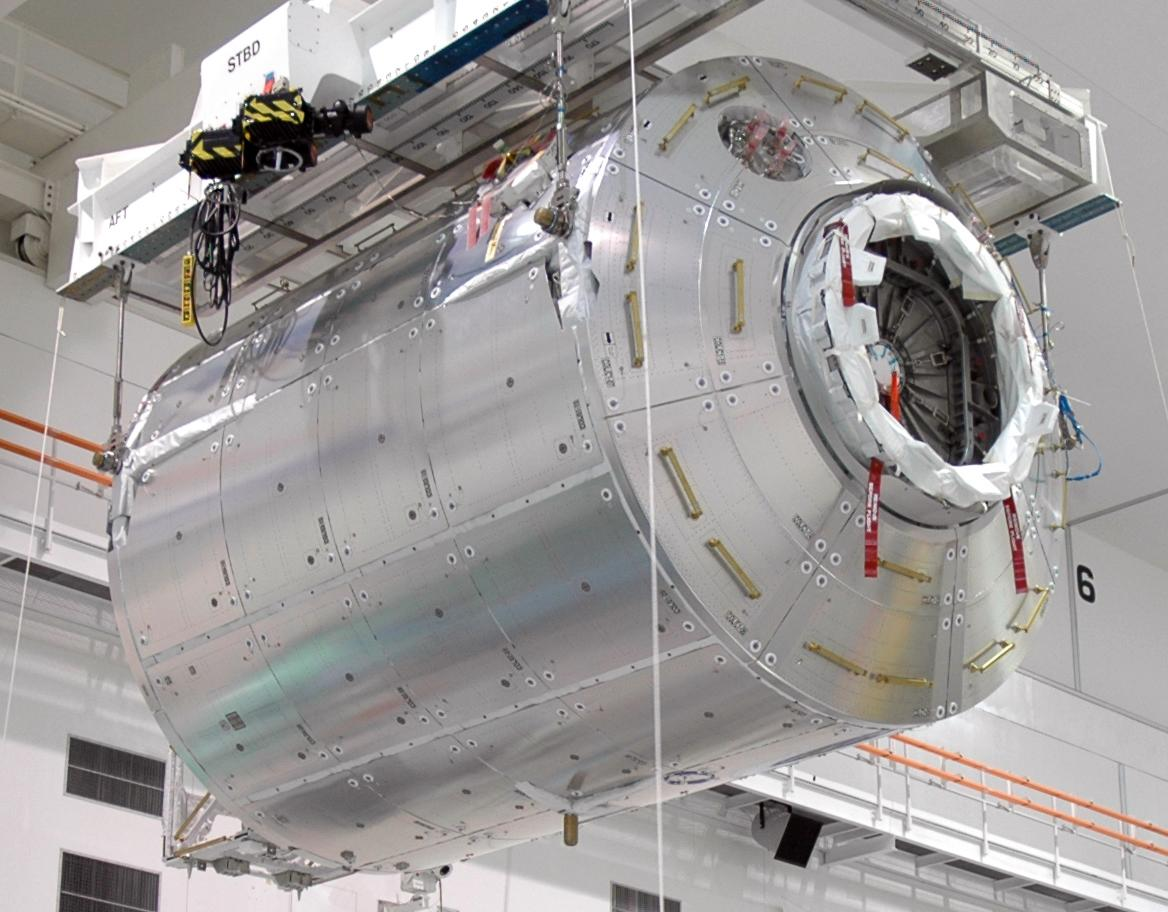
ISS module Columbus at Kennedy Space Center's Space Station Processing Facility

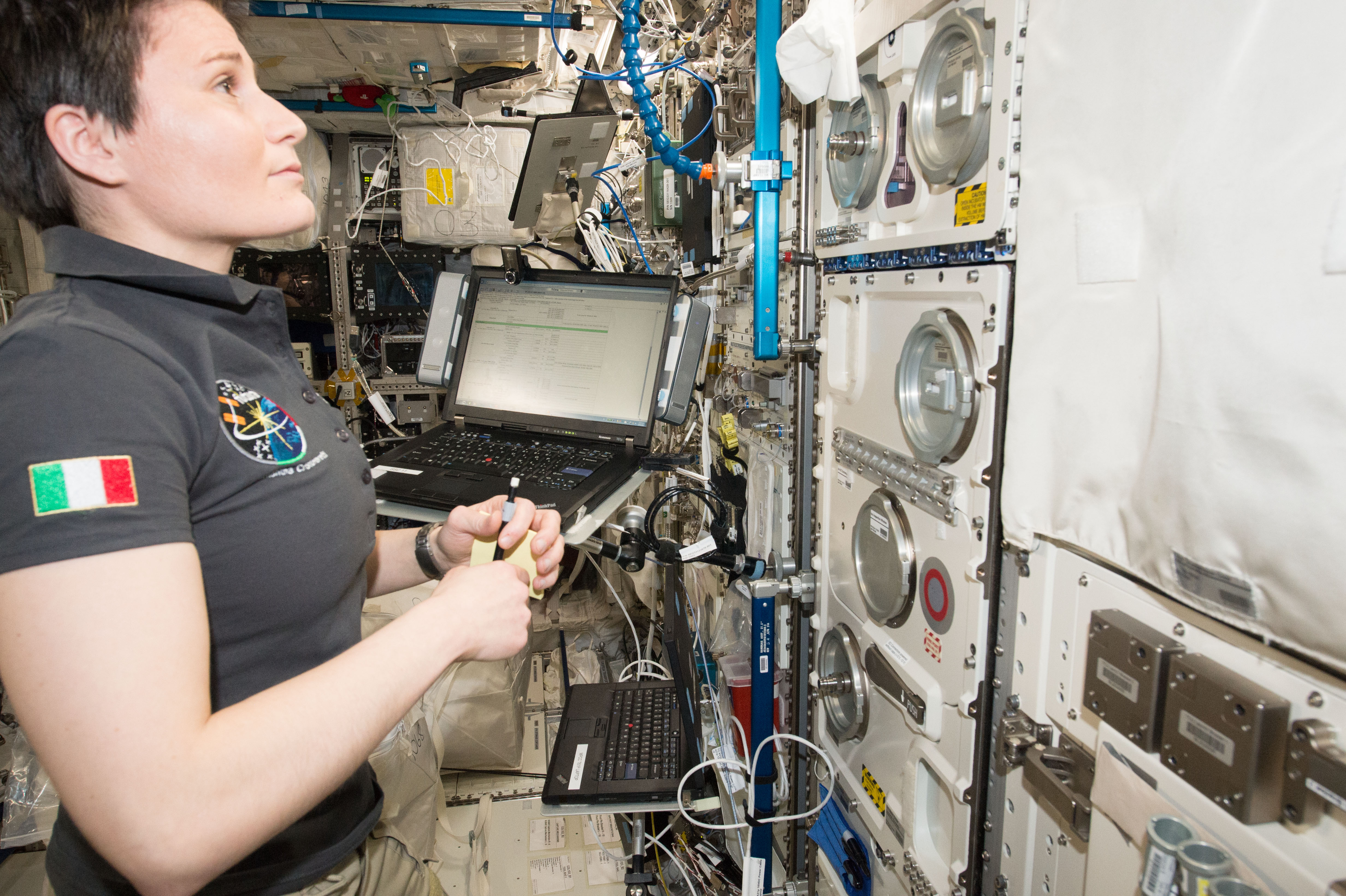
Samantha Cristoforetti on the Biolab in the Columbus module

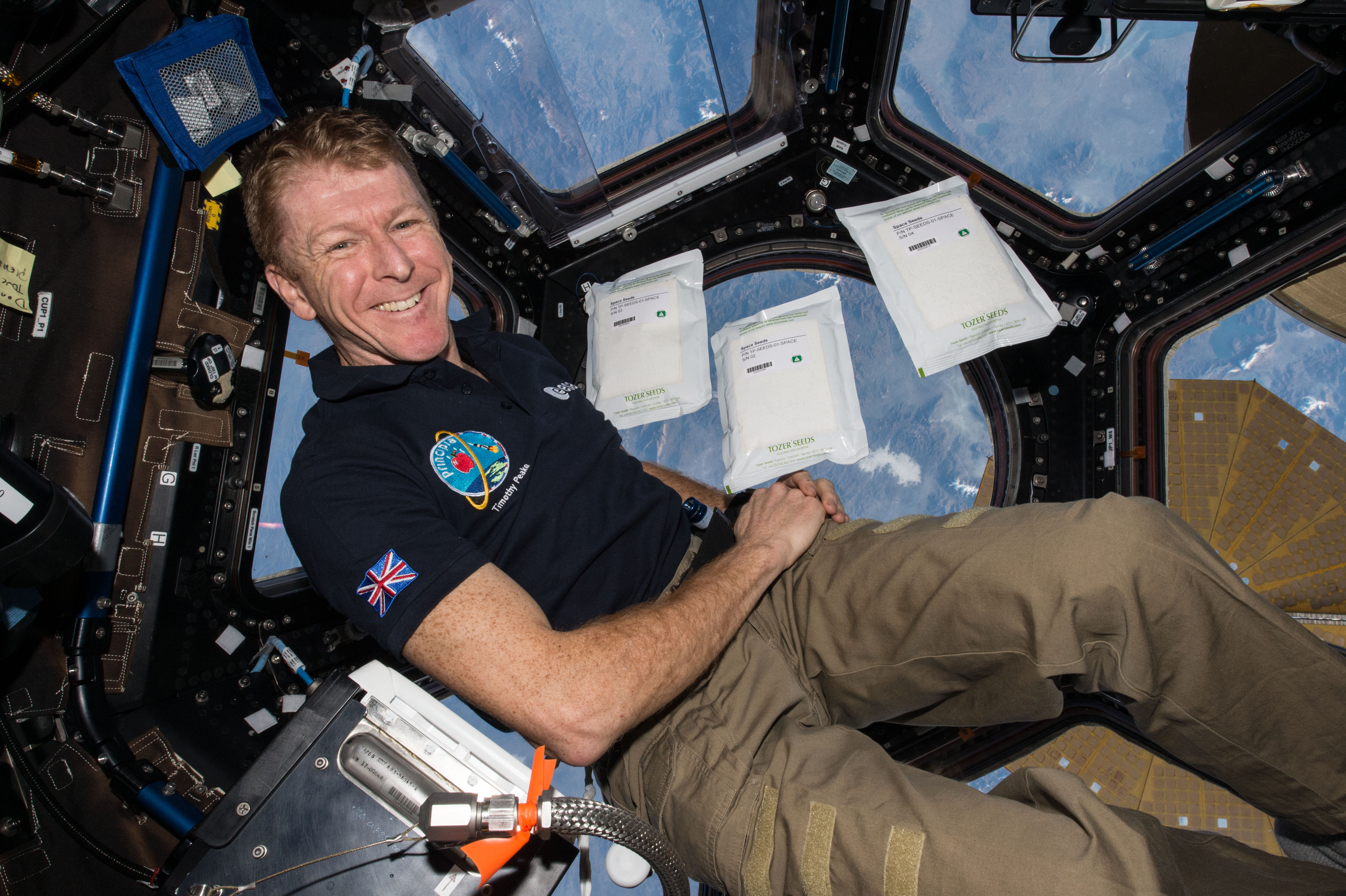
Timothy Peake in the Cupola

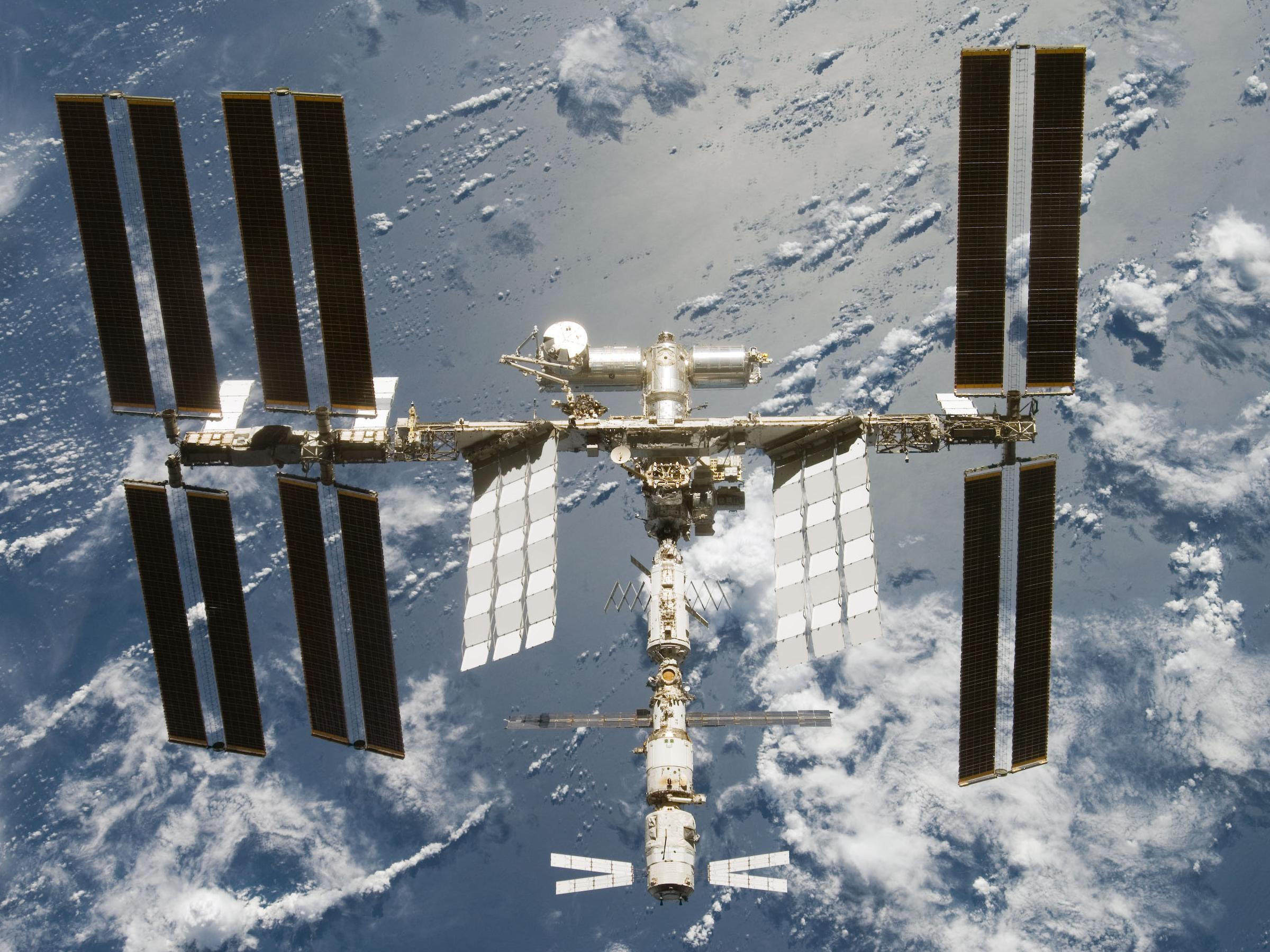
ATV Jules Verne seen at the bottom of the ISS

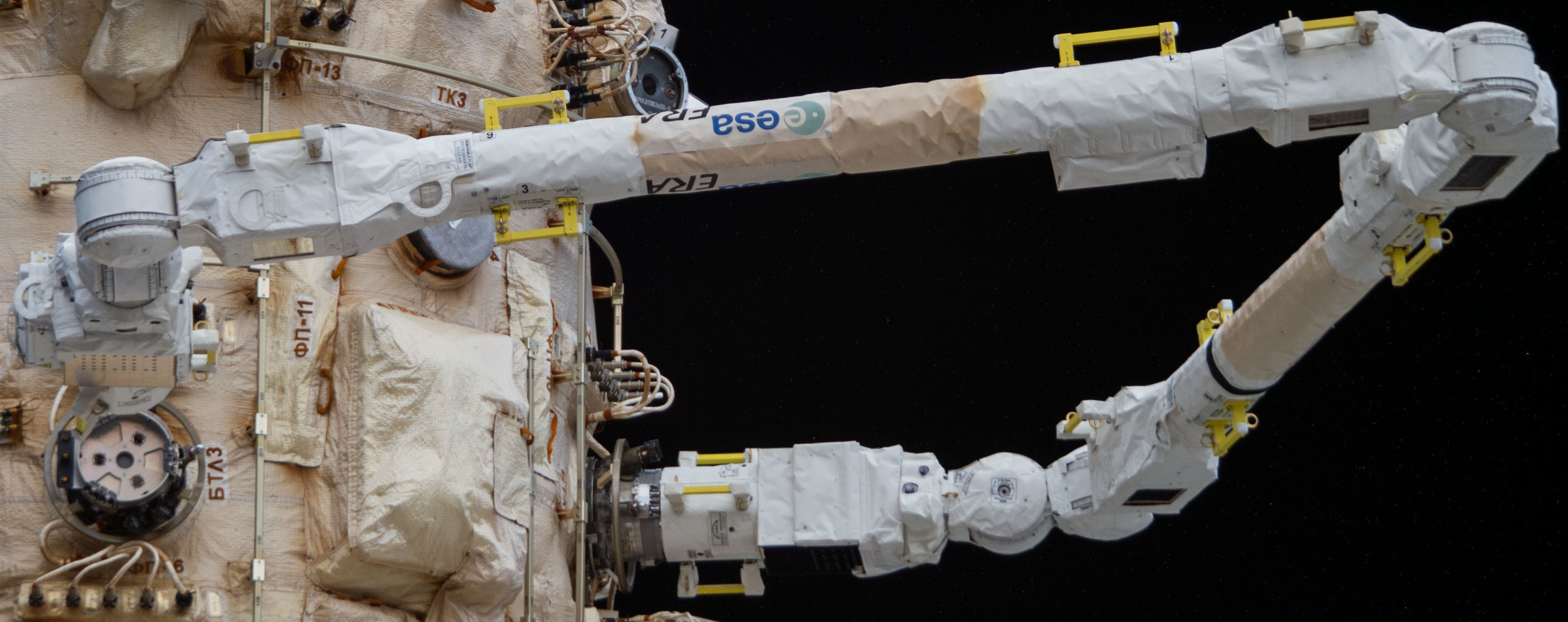
European Robotic Arm

At the time the ESA was formed, its main goals did not encompass human space flight; rather it considered itself to be primarily a scientific research organisation for uncrewed space exploration in contrast to its American and Soviet counterparts. Non-Soviet European in space was not an ESA astronaut on a European space craft; it was Czechoslovak Vladimír Remek who in 1978 became the first non-Soviet or American in space (the first man in space being Yuri Gagarin of the Soviet Union) – on a Soviet Soyuz spacecraft, followed by the Pole Mirosław Hermaszewski and East German Sigmund Jähn in the same year. This Soviet co-operation programme, known as Intercosmos, primarily involved the participation of Eastern bloc countries. In 1982, however, Jean-Loup Chrétien became the first non-Communist Bloc astronaut on a flight to the Soviet Salyut 7 space station.

Because Chrétien did not officially fly into space as an ESA astronaut, but rather as a member of the French CNES astronaut corps, the German Ulf Merbold is considered the first ESA astronaut to fly into space. He participated in the STS-9 Space Shuttle mission that included the first use of the European-built Spacelab in 1983. STS-9 marked the beginning of an extensive ESA/NASA joint partnership that included dozens of space flights of ESA astronauts in the following years. Some of these missions with Spacelab were fully funded and organisationally and scientifically controlled by the ESA (such as two missions by Germany and one by Japan) with European astronauts as full crew members rather than guests on board. Beside paying for Spacelab flights and seats on the shuttles, the ESA continued its human space flight co-operation with the Soviet Union and later Russia, including numerous visits to Mir.

During the latter half of the 1980s, European human space flights changed from being the exception to routine and therefore, in 1990, the European Astronaut Centre in Cologne, Germany was established. It selects and trains prospective astronauts and is responsible for the co-ordination with international partners, especially with regard to the International Space Station. As of 2006, the ESA astronaut corps officially included twelve members, including nationals from most large European countries except the United Kingdom.

In 2008, the ESA started to recruit new astronauts so that final selection would be due in spring 2009. Almost 10,000 people registered as astronaut candidates before registration ended in June 2008. 8,413 fulfilled the initial application criteria. Of the applicants, 918 were chosen to take part in the first stage of psychological testing, which narrowed down the field to 192. After two-stage psychological tests and medical evaluation in early 2009, as well as formal interviews, six new members of the European Astronaut Corps were selected – five men and one woman.

== Current members ==
As of 2024, there are eleven active members of the European Astronaut Corps. Five were selected in 2009, one was selected in 2015, and the remaining five selected in 2022.

Missions in italics are scheduled and subject to change.

Name	Country	Selection	Time in space	Missions
Sophie Adenot	France	2022	237d 5h 18m	SpaceX Crew-12 (Expedition 74/75)
Pablo Álvarez Fernández	Spain	2022	0	None, awaiting assignment
Rosemary Coogan	United Kingdom	2022	0	None, awaiting assignment
Samantha Cristoforetti	Italy	2009	370d 5h 45m	Soyuz TMA-15M (Expedition 42/43); SpaceX Crew-4 (Expedition 67/68)
Alexander Gerst	Germany	2009	362d 1h 50m	Soyuz TMA-13M (Expedition 40/41); Soyuz MS-09 (Expedition 56/57)
Raphaël Liégeois	Belgium	2022	0	Unspecified SpaceX Crew flight
Matthias Maurer	Germany	2015	176d 2h 39m	SpaceX Crew-3 (Expedition 66/67)
Andreas Mogensen	Denmark	2009	208d 22h 34m	Soyuz TMA-18M/16M; SpaceX Crew-7 (Expedition 69/70)
Luca Parmitano	Italy	2009	366d 23h 1m	Soyuz TMA-09M (Expedition 36/37); Soyuz MS-13 (Expedition 60/61); Artemis III
Thomas Pesquet	France	2009	396d 11h 34m	Soyuz MS-03 (Expedition 50/51); SpaceX Crew-2 (Expedition 65/66); Vast-PAM-1
Marco Sieber	Switzerland	2022	0	None, awaiting assignment

All of the current members of the corps, other than the 2022 ESA Group, have flown to space and have visited the ISS. French astronaut Thomas Pesquet is the member of the corps who has accumulated the most time in space with 396 days, 11 hours, and 34 minutes. He is the record holder for all the European astronauts in history. The corps currently includes Samantha Cristoforetti, who formerly held the record for the longest spaceflight by a woman.

=== 2009 Group ===
On 3 April 2008, ESA director general Jean-Jacques Dordain announced that recruiting for a new class of European astronauts will start in the near future. The selection program for 4 new astronauts was launched on 19 May 2008 with applications due by 16 June 2008 so that final selection would be due spring 2009. Almost 10,000 people registered as astronaut candidates as of 18 June 2008. 8,413 fulfilled the initial application criteria. From these 918 were chosen to take part in the first stage of psychological testing which led to 192 candidates on 24 September 2008. After two stage psychological tests 80 candidates continued on to medical evaluation in January–February 2009. 40 or so candidates head to formal interviews to select four new members to European Astronaut Corps.

=== 2022 Group ===
Recruitment for the 2022 ESA Astronaut Group took place over 2021–22 and added five "career" astronauts as well as for the first time a "reserve pool" of 11 astronaut candidates, and also a person with a physical disability through the "parastronaut feasibility project".

In June 2023, Marcus Wandt, originally a reserve astronaut, was selected for Axiom Space mission and transitioned to "project" astronaut. This later was set in place for Polish reserve astronaut Sławosz Uznański-Wiśniewski.

Adrianos Golemis, a Greek research physician who has been Lead Flight Surgeon since 2018, scored in the top 0.1% of candidates but was not chosen as an astronaut. However, he would begin astronaut training in 2026 when it was announced that he would be sent to the ISS on Vast-PAM-1 as a project astronaut on behalf of the Greek government.

Name	Country	Role
Sophie Adenot	France	Career
Pablo Álvarez Fernández	Spain	Career
Rosemary Coogan	United Kingdom	Career
Raphaël Liégeois	Belgium	Career
Marco Alain Sieber	Switzerland	Career
John McFall	United Kingdom	Project
Sławosz Uznański	Poland	Project
Marcus Wandt	Sweden	Project
Meganne Christian	United Kingdom	Reserve
Anthea Comellini	Italy	Reserve
Sara García Alonso	Spain	Reserve
Andrea Patassa	Italy	Reserve
Carmen Possnig	Austria	Reserve
Arnaud Prost	France	Reserve
Amelie Schoenenwald	Germany	Reserve
Aleš Svoboda	Czech Republic	Reserve
Nicola Winter	Germany	Reserve

The funding by NASA and Russia of the International Space Station is currently planned to end in 2030. Thanks to their involvement with NASA's Orion programme, ESA will receive three flight opportunities for European astronauts to the Lunar Gateway.

== Former members ==
There are 18 former members of the ESA astronaut corps.

Some ESA astronauts were selected by other European agencies and then enrolled into the European Astronaut Corps in 1998.

Name	Country	Selection	Time in space	Missions
Hans Schlegel	Germany	1987 (DLR)	22d 18h 01m	STS-55; STS-122
André Kuipers	Netherlands	1998	203d 15h 50m	Soyuz TMA-4/3; Soyuz TMA-03M (Expedition 30/31)
Christer Fuglesang	Sweden	1992	26d 17h 37m	STS-116; STS-128
Léopold Eyharts	France	1990 (CNES)	68d 21h 28m	Soyuz TM-27/26; STS-122/123 (Expedition 16)
Jean-François Clervoy	France	1992	28d 03h 04m	STS-66; STS-84; STS-103
Maurizio Cheli	Italy	1992	15d 17h 41m	STS-75
Pedro Duque	Spain	1992	18d 18h 46m	STS-95; Soyuz TMA-3/2
Reinhold Ewald	Germany	1990 (DLR)	19d 16h 34m	Soyuz TM-25/24
Umberto Guidoni	Italy	1989 (ASI)	27d 15h 10m	STS-75; STS-100
Claudie Haigneré	France	1985 (CNES)	25d 14h 22m	Soyuz TM-24/23; Soyuz TM-33/32
Jean-Pierre Haigneré	France	1985 (CNES)	209d 12h 24m	Soyuz TM-17/16; Soyuz TM-29 (Mir EO-27)
Ulf Merbold	Germany	1978	49d 21h 36m	STS-9; STS-42; Soyuz TM-20/19 (Euromir 94)
Marianne Merchez	Belgium	1992	—N/a	—N/a
Ernst Messerschmid	West Germany	1982 (DLR)	7d 00h 44m	STS-61-A
Paolo Nespoli	Italy	1998	313d 02h 36m	STS-120; Soyuz TMA-20 (Expedition 26/27); Soyuz MS-05 (Expedition 52/53)
Claude Nicollier	Switzerland	1978	42d 12h 03m	STS-46; STS-61; STS-75; STS-103
Wubbo Ockels	Netherlands	1978	7d 00h 44m	STS-61-A
Philippe Perrin	France	1990 (CNES)	13d 20h 35m	STS-111
Thomas Reiter	Germany	1992	350d 05h 35m	Soyuz TM-22 (Mir EO-20); STS-121/116 (Expedition 13/14)
Gerhard Thiele	Germany	1987 (DLR)	11d 05h 38m	STS-99
Michel Tognini	France	1985 (CNES)	18d 17h 45m	Soyuz TM-15/14; STS-93
Frank De Winne	Belgium	1998	198d 17h 34m	Soyuz TMA-1/TM-34; Soyuz TMA-15 (Expedition 20/21)
Roberto Vittori	Italy	1998	35d 12h 26m	Soyuz TM-34/33; Soyuz TMA-6/5; STS-134
Timothy Peake	United Kingdom	2009	185d 22h 11m	Soyuz TMA-19M (Expedition 46/47)

== Heads of the EAC ==
The following people (all retired or active duty astronauts) have served as Head of the European Astronaut Corps.

Name	Country	Years served	Missions Flown
Ernst Messerschmid	Germany	2000–2004	STS-61-A
Michel Tognini	France	2005–2011	Soyuz TM-15/14, STS-93
Frank De Winne	Belgium	2012–2025	Soyuz TMA-1/TM-34, Soyuz TMA-15 (Expedition 20/21)
Andreas Mogensen	Denmark	2025–present	Soyuz TMA-18M/16M, SpaceX Crew-7 (Expedition 69/70)

== European astronauts outside of ESA ==
=== Interkosmos ===
Ten Europeans became astronauts within the Soviet Union's Interkosmos program, which allowed citizens of allied nations to fly missions to the Salyut 6, Salyut 7 and Mir space station.

- (Bulgaria) Aleksandr Panayotov Aleksandrov
- (France) Jean-Loup Chrétien
- (Hungary) Bertalan Farkas
- (Poland) Mirosław Hermaszewski
- (Bulgaria) Georgi Ivanov
- (East Germany) Sigmund Jähn
- (Romania) Dumitru Prunariu
- (Czechoslovakia) Vladimír Remek
- (United Kingdom) Helen Sharman
- (Austria) Franz Viehböck

=== Space Shuttle ===
NASA trained and flew astronauts from allied nations on the Space Shuttle, especially as payload specialists for scientific missions such as Spacelab. Prior to the foundation of the ESA astronaut corps, both the French CNES and the German DLR had selected their own rosters of astronauts, notably in preparation for the introduction of the ISS. The following people flew on various Shuttle missions. (Note: Other European astronauts who flew on the Space Shuttle were transferred to the ESA astronaut corps, and are listed above.)

- (France) Patrick Baudry
- (France) Jean-Jacques Favier
- (Belgium) Dirk Frimout
- (Germany) Reinhard Furrer
- (Ukraine) Leonid Kadeniuk
- (Italy) Franco Malerba
- (Germany) Ulrich Walter

=== Russian Mir missions ===
The following people flew on missions to Mir under agreements between their nations and Russia.

- (Slovakia) Ivan Bella
- (Germany) Klaus-Dietrich Flade

=== Private spaceflight ===
Hungary developed their own independent Astronaut Program, HUNOR or the Hungarian to Orbit program, to select and train a Hungarian astronaut (Tibor Kapu), and backup (Gyula Cserényi), for the private Axiom Mission 4. As such, despite being astronauts of the Hungarian Space Office, neither are members of the European Astronaut Corps.

- (Hungary) Tibor Kapu

== Space Shuttle missions ==
Astronauts from the European Astronaut Corps participated in several NASA Space Shuttle missions before the ISS era, in particular as Spacelab payload specialists. NASA considered the full-time ESA astronauts as payload specialists, but offered some the opportunity to train with its own astronauts and become NASA mission specialists. (This list excludes missions to Mir or the ISS)

=== As Payload Specialists ===
- Ulf Merbold – STS-9 (Spacelab), STS-42 (Spacelab)
- Reinhard Furrer – STS-61-A (Spacelab-D1 Mission)
- Wubbo Ockels – STS-61-A (Spacelab-D1 Mission)
- Hans Schlegel – STS-55 (Spacelab-D2 Mission)
- Ulrich Walter – STS-55 (Spacelab-D2 Mission)

=== As Mission Specialists ===
- Claude Nicollier – STS-46, STS-61 (Hubble Space Telescope) STS-75, STS-103 (Hubble)
- Maurizio Cheli – STS-75
- Jean-François Clervoy – STS-66, STS-84 (Mir), STS-103 (Hubble)
- Gerhard Thiele – STS-99
- Pedro Duque – STS-95

== Missions to the Mir space stations ==
Astronauts from Europe have flown to Mir both on board Soyuz vehicles (as part of the Euromir programme) or on board the Space Shuttle.

- Jean-Loup Chrétien – Aragatz (1988) France
- Helen Sharman – Project Juno (1991) UK
- Franz Viehböck – Austromir '91 (1991) Austria
- Klaus-Dietrich Flade – Mir '92 (1992) Germany
- Michel Tognini – Antarès (1992) France
- Jean-Pierre Haigneré – Altair (1993) France
- Ulf Merbold – Euromir '94 (1994) Germany
- Thomas Reiter – Euromir '95 (1995) Germany
- Claudie Haigneré – Cassiopée (1996) France
- Reinhold Ewald – Mir '97 (1997) Germany
- Jean-François Clervoy – STS-84 (1997) France
- Jean-Loup Chrétien – STS-86 (1997) France
- Léopold Eyharts – Pégase (1998) France
- Jean-Pierre Haigneré – Perseus (1999) France
- Ivan Bella – Stefanik (1999) Slovakia

== Missions to the International Space Station ==
European astronauts to have visited the ISS are:

Astronaut	Agency	Mission	Launch	Return	Expedition	Launch Date	Return Date	Note
(Italy) Umberto Guidoni	ESA		STS-100	STS-100	Expedition 2	19 Apr 2001	1 May 2001	Flight 6A with MPLM Raffaello, visited Expedition 2 crew.
(France) Claudie Haigneré	CNES	Andromède	Soyuz TM-33	Soyuz TM-32	Expedition 3	21 Oct 2001	31 Oct 2001	Visited Expedition 3 crew.
(Italy) Roberto Vittori	ESA	Marco Polo	Soyuz TM-34	Soyuz TM-33	Expedition 4	25 Apr 2002	5 May 2002	Visited Expedition 4 crew.
(France) Philippe Perrin	CNES		STS-111	STS-111	Expedition 4/5	5 Jun 2002	19 Jun 2002	ISS Assembly Flight UF-2, launched with Expedition 5 crew and landed with Expedition 4 crew.
(Belgium) Frank De Winne	ESA	Odissea	Soyuz TMA-1	Soyuz TM-34	Expedition 5	30 Oct 2002	10 Nov 2002	Visited Expedition 5 crew.
(Spain) Pedro Duque	ESA	Cervantes	Soyuz TMA-3	Soyuz TMA-2	Expedition 7/8	18 Oct 2003	28 Oct 2003	Launched with Expedition 8 crew landed with Expedition 7 crew.
(Netherlands) André Kuipers	ESA	DELTA	Soyuz TMA-4	Soyuz TMA-3	Expedition 8/9	19 Apr 2004	30 Apr 2004	Launched with Expedition 8 crew, landed with Expedition 8 crew.
(Italy) Roberto Vittori	ESA	Eneide	Soyuz TMA-6	Soyuz TMA-5	Expedition 10/11	15 Apr 2005	24 Apr 2005	Launched with Expedition 11 crew, landed with Expedition 10 crew.
(Germany) Thomas Reiter	ESA	Astrolab	STS-121	STS-116	Expedition 13/14	4 Jul 2006	22 Dec 2006	ISS Assembly Flight ULF 1.1, first European to live on the ISS as flight engineer on Expedition 13 and 14.
(Sweden) Christer Fuglesang	ESA	Celsius	STS-116	STS-116	Expedition 14	10 Dec 2006	22 Dec 2006	ISS Assembly Flight 12A.1, visited Expedition 14 crew.
(Italy) Paolo Nespoli	ESA	Esperia	STS-120	STS-120	Expedition 16	23 Oct 2007	7 Nov 2007	ISS Assembly Flight 10A, visited Expedition 16 crew.
(Germany) Hans Schlegel	ESA	Columbus	STS-122	STS-122	Expedition 16	7 Feb 2008	20 Feb 2008	ISS Assembly Flight 1E, visited Expedition 16 crew.
(France) Léopold Eyharts	ESA	Columbus	STS-122	STS-123	Expedition 16	7 Feb 2008	27 Mar 2008	ISS Assembly Flight 1E, second European to live on the ISS as flight engineer on Expedition 16.
(Belgium) Frank De Winne	ESA	OasISS	Soyuz TMA-15	Soyuz TMA-15	Expedition 20/21	27 May 2009	1 Dec 2009	Flight engineer on Expedition 20, first European to command the ISS as commander of Expedition 21.
(Sweden) Christer Fuglesang	ESA	AlISSé	STS-128	STS-128	Expedition 20	29 Aug 2009	12 Sep 2009	ISS Assembly Flight 17A, visited Expedition 20 crew.
(Italy) Paolo Nespoli	ESA	MagISStra	Soyuz TMA-20	Soyuz TMA-20	Expedition 26/27	15 Dec 2010	24 May 2011	Flight engineer on Expedition 26 and 27.
(Italy) Roberto Vittori	ESA	DAMA	STS-134	STS-134	Expedition 27/28	16 May 2011	1 Jun 2011	Visited Expedition 27 and 28.
(Netherlands) André Kuipers	ESA	PromISSe	Soyuz TMA-03M	Soyuz TMA-03M	Expedition 30/31	21 Dec 2011	1 Jul 2012	Flight engineer on Expedition 30 and 31.
(Italy) Luca Parmitano	ESA	Volare	Soyuz TMA-09M	Soyuz TMA-09M	Expedition 36/37	28 May 2013	11 Nov 2013	Flight engineer on Expedition 36 and 37, first member of the 2009 ESA astronaut class to fly.
(Germany) Alexander Gerst	ESA	Blue Dot	Soyuz TMA-13M	Soyuz TMA-13M	Expedition 40/41	28 May 2014	10 Nov 2014	Flight engineer on Expedition 40 and 41.
(Italy) Samantha Cristoforetti	ESA	Futura	Soyuz TMA-15M	Soyuz TMA-15M	Expedition 42/43	23 Nov 2014	11 Jun 2015	Flight engineer on Expedition 42 and 43, Longest uninterrupted spaceflight of a European astronaut.
(Denmark) Andreas Mogensen	ESA	IrISS	Soyuz TMA-18M	Soyuz TMA-16M	Expedition 44	2 Sep 2015	12 Sep 2015	Visited Expedition 44 crew, first Danish astronaut.
(United Kingdom) Timothy Peake	ESA	Principia	Soyuz TMA-19M	Soyuz TMA-19M	Expedition 46/47	15 Dec 2015	18 June 2016	Flight engineer on Expedition 46 and 47.
(France) Thomas Pesquet	ESA	Proxima	Soyuz MS-03	Soyuz MS-03	Expedition 50/51	17 Nov 2016	16 May 2017	Flight engineer on Expedition 50 and 51.
(Italy) Paolo Nespoli	ESA	Vita	Soyuz MS-05	Soyuz MS-05	Expedition 52/53	28 July 2017	14 December 2017	Flight engineer on Expedition 52 and 53.
(Germany) Alexander Gerst	ESA	Horizons	Soyuz MS-09	Soyuz MS-09	Expedition 56/57	6 June 2018	20 December 2018	Flight engineer on Expedition 56, second European to command the ISS as commander of Expedition 57.
(Italy) Luca Parmitano	ESA	Beyond	Soyuz MS-13	Soyuz MS-13	Expedition 60/61	20 July 2019	6 February 2020	Flight engineer on Expedition 60, third European to command the ISS as commander of Expedition 61.
(France) Thomas Pesquet	ESA	Alpha	SpaceX Crew-2	SpaceX Crew-2	Expedition 65/66	23 April 2021	9 November 2021	Flight engineer on Expedition 65, fourth European to command the ISS as commander of the final part of Expedition 65 and the first part of Expedition 66.
(Germany) Matthias Maurer	ESA	Cosmic Kiss	SpaceX Crew-3	SpaceX Crew-3	Expedition 66/67	11 November 2021	6 May 2022	Flight engineer on Expedition 66 and 67.
(Italy) Samantha Cristoforetti	ESA	Minerva	SpaceX Crew-4	SpaceX Crew-4	Expedition 67/68	27 Apr 2022	14 Oct 2022	Flight engineer on Expedition 67, fifth European to command the ISS as commander of the first part of Expedition 68.
(Denmark) Andreas Mogensen	ESA	Huginn	SpaceX Crew-7	SpaceX Crew-7	Expedition 69/70	26 August 2023	12 March 2024	First non-American astronaut to pilot a United States spacecraft. Sixth European to command the ISS as commander of the first part of Expedition 70.
(Sweden) Marcus Wandt	ESA (Project)	Muninn	Axiom Mission 3	Axiom Mission 3	Visiting	18 January 2024	9 February 2024	First ESA astronaut on a private mission to ISS, first from the 2022 European Space Agency Astronaut Group to fly in space. First ESA project astronaut, fastest-trained astronaut in history after selection to fly into orbit.
(Poland) Sławosz Uznański-Wiśniewski	ESA (Project)	Ignis	Axiom Mission 4	Axiom Mission 4	Visiting	25 June 2025	15 July 2025	Second ESA astronaut on a private mission to ISS.
(France) Sophie Adenot	ESA	Epsilon	SpaceX Crew-12	SpaceX Crew-12	Expedition 74/75	13 February 2026	8 October 2026	

== Future missions ==
Future European astronauts to space are:

Astronaut	Agency	Mission	Launch	Return	Expedition	Launch Date	Return Date	Note
(Italy) Luca Parmitano	ESA		Artemis III	Artemis III	N/A	NET June 2027		First European to fly on Orion and Space Launch System rocket.
(France) Thomas Pesquet	ESA		Vast-PAM-1	Vast-PAM-1	Visiting	NET July 2027		
(Czech Republic) Aleš Svoboda	ESA (Project)		Vast-PAM-1	Vast-PAM-1	Visiting	NET July 2027		
(Greece) Adrianos Golemis	ESA (Project)		Vast-PAM-1	Vast-PAM-1	Visiting	NET July 2027		First Greek astronaut.
(France) Arnaud Prost	ESA (Project)		Vast-1	Vast-1	N/A	NET 2027		First mission to a commercial space station.

== See also ==
- Other astronaut corps:
  - Canadian Astronaut Corps
  - NASA Astronaut Corps (United States)
  - Indian Astronaut Corps (India)
  - JAXA Astronaut Corps (Japan)
  - Roscosmos Cosmonaut Corps (Russia)
  - People's Liberation Army Astronaut Corps (China)
- List of astronauts by selection
- Human spaceflight
- History of spaceflight
- European contribution to the International Space Station
