= Marco Sieber =

Swiss astronaut and doctor

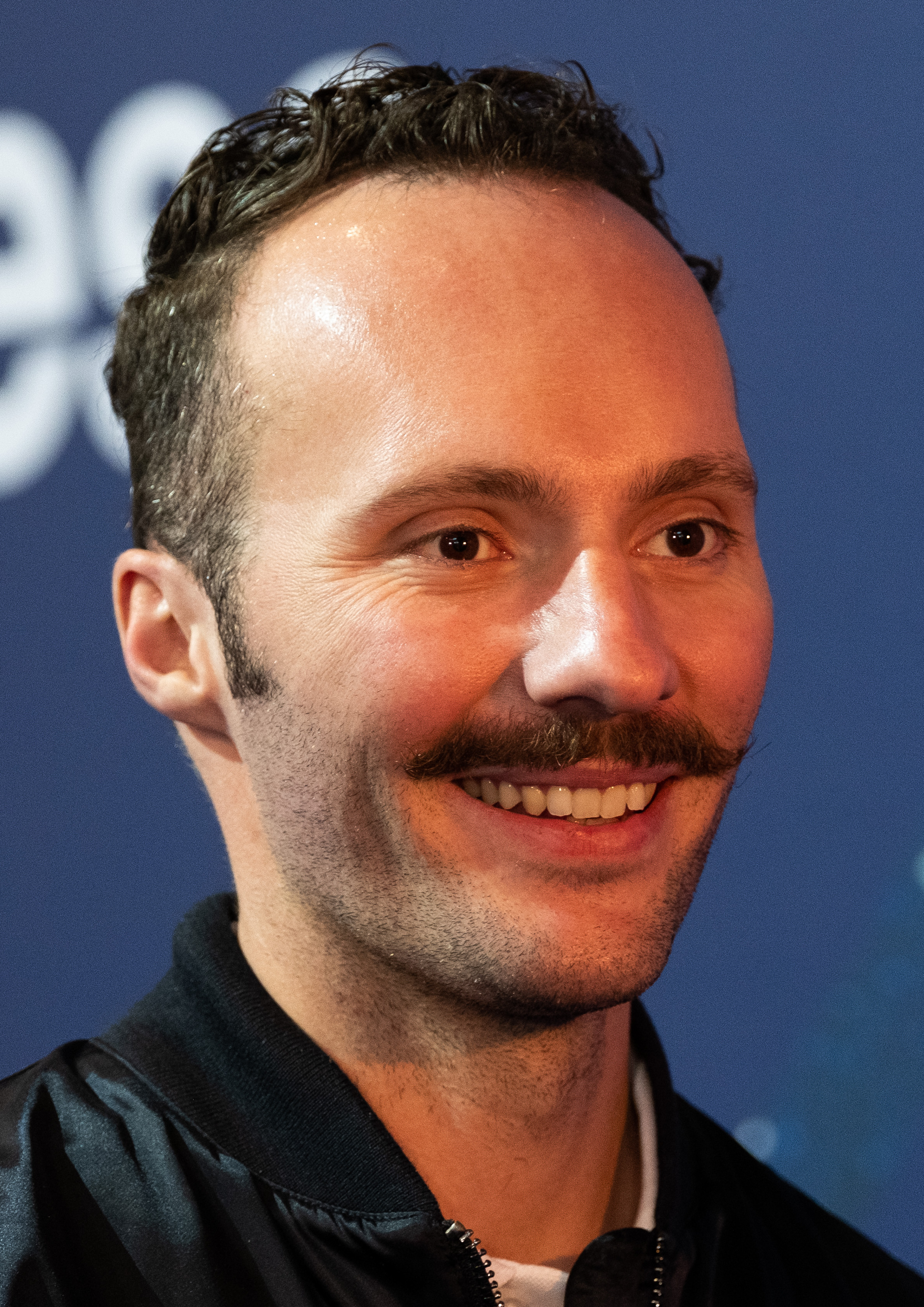
- Sieber at the announcement of the 2022 European Space Agency Astronaut Group in Paris
- Born: 1989 (age 36–37)
- Education: University of Bern
- Occupations: Doctor in surgery, anesthesia, urology, and emergency services
- Space career

ESA astronaut
- Previous occupation: Paratrooper in the Swiss army; factory worker; construction worker; mobile toilet cleaner
- Rank: Wachtmeister (sergeant)
- Selection: 2022 ESA Group

Marco Alain Sieber (born 1989) is a Swiss astronaut and medical doctor. Sieber graduated from Gymnasium Burgdorf in Switzerland in 2007 and later joined the Swiss Army's Special Forces Commando, achieving the rank of Sergeant. He earned a Doctor of Medicine degree in 2015 from the University of Bern, specialising in robotic surgery, and received a specialist diploma in pre-hospital emergency and rescue medicine in 2021. He was selected as a member of the 2022 European Space Agency Astronaut Group.

== Early life and education ==
Marco Sieber was born in Biel in 1989 and raised in Kirchberg, both located in the Swiss Canton of Bern. Two interests that captivated him as a child were dinosaurs and space. Sieber graduated from the Burgdorf Gymnasium in 2007.

In 2009, he worked as a parachute instructor for pre-military courses and assisting with anatomy and physiology courses at the University of Bern. He earned his medical doctorate from the University of Bern in 2015, receiving top marks for his thesis on robot-assisted surgery, and later obtained the FMH-recognized certificate in emergency and rescue medicine from SGNOR in 2021.

== Career ==
=== Military career ===
In 2009, he began paratrooper training with the Swiss Army's Special Forces Command, achieving the rank of Wachtmeister (sergeant).

=== Manual labour ===
Between the ages of 20 and 23, Sieber was employed by Mobitoil, where he drove to various locations and cleaned mobile toilets used at construction sites and festivals. He also worked assembling parts in a factory and assisted on construction sites.

=== Medical career ===
Between 2015 and 2017, Sieber served as an assistant doctor in general surgery and intensive care in Interlaken before becoming the chief medical officer for KFOR, the NATO-led international peacekeeping force in Kosovo. From 2019 to 2021, he worked as an anesthesiology assistant in Interlaken and as an emergency doctor in helicopter rescue, eventually joining the urology team at the Biel Hospital Center in 2021. Despite his current job as an astronaut at the ESA, he hopes to continue working occasionally in a hospital emergency ward to maintain and refine his medical skills.

=== Astronaut career ===
Sieber was one of five career astronauts of the European Astronaut Corps chosen as part of the 2022 selection of astronauts. He will have the opportunity to become Switzerland's second person in space, following astronaut Claude Nicollier.

Sieber completed ESA's Basic Training curriculum at the European Astronaut Centre, and graduated alongside his classmates from "The Hoppers" group on 22 April 2024. Sieber has said that his first flight to the ISS will occur sometime between 2027 and 2030. Before embarking on a mission, he will complete additional mission-specific training blocks. Aside from that, there will likely be a quieter period without continuous training. During this time, he will take on other responsibilities at ESA.

In September 2025 Sieber participated in the ESA CAVES 2025 course held in the Matese mountains in the Italian Apennines.

== Personal life ==
A licensed private pilot and fluent in English and French alongside his native German and Swiss German, Sieber enjoys outdoor and adventure sports, including skydiving, paragliding, diving, ski touring, and kitesurfing.
