= Andrea Patassa =

Italian test pilot and reserve astronaut

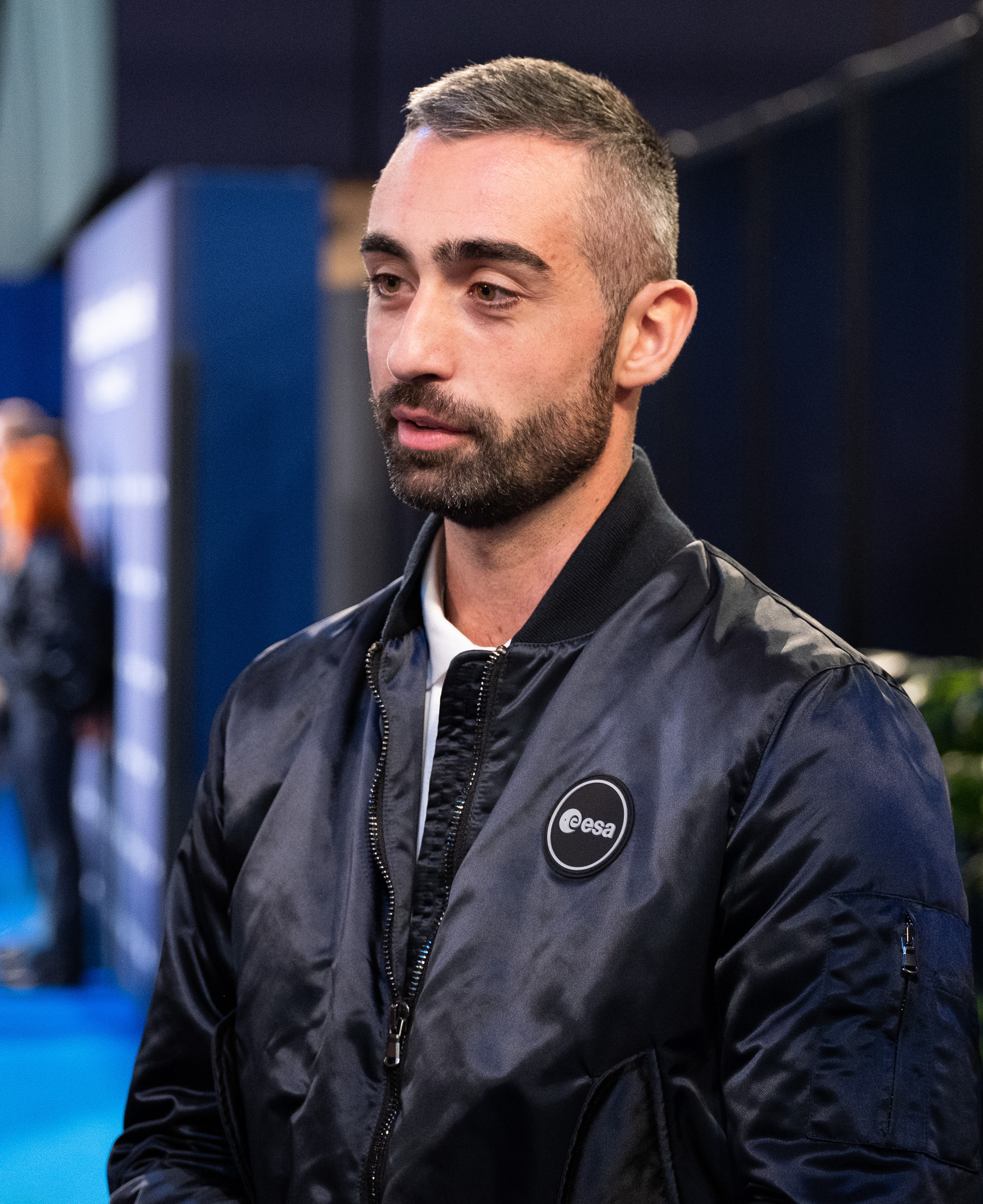
- Patassa in 2022
- Born: 1991 (age 34–35); Spoleto, Italy
- Occupations: Test pilot and astronaut
- Space career

ESA reserve astronaut
- Selection: 2022 ESA Group

Andrea Patassa (born 1991) is an Italian test pilot and astronaut. He holds the rank of captain in the Italian Air Force and serves at the Italian Air Force's Reparto Sperimentale di Volo in Pratica di Mare. He is a member of the astronaut reserve for the 2022 European Space Agency Astronaut Group.

== Early life and education ==
Patassa grew up in the town Spoleto, in the province of Perugia of central Italy. He attended liceo scientifico Alessandro Volta, in Spoleto.

In 2010, Patassa joined the Italian Air Force and attended the Accademia Aeronautica in Pozzuoli. He completed a master's degree in Aeronautical Science at the University of Naples Federico II. In 2014, he studied abroad at the French Air Force Academy in Salon-de-Provence. A student athlete, Patassa competed in the pole vault.

== Career ==
Patassa completed the Euro-NATO Joint Jet Pilot Training Program at Sheppard Air Force Base of the U.S. armed forces in Texas. He earned his military pilot licence from the Italian air force in 2017. He served as an operational pilot flying the Eurofighter, participating in international operations in Lithuania and the Middle East. In 2022, he graduated as a test pilot from the USAF Test Pilot School at the Edwards Air Force Base in California, U.S.

In November 2022, he succeeded in the selection process of the European Space Agency among more than 22.500 applicants from all over Europe and became a member of the Astronaut Reserve for the European Astronaut Corps. As part of the 2022 group of reserve astronauts alongside fellow Italian Anthea Comellini, he is a candidate for future space missions.
