= Sara García Alonso =

Spanish cancer researcher and reserve astronaut

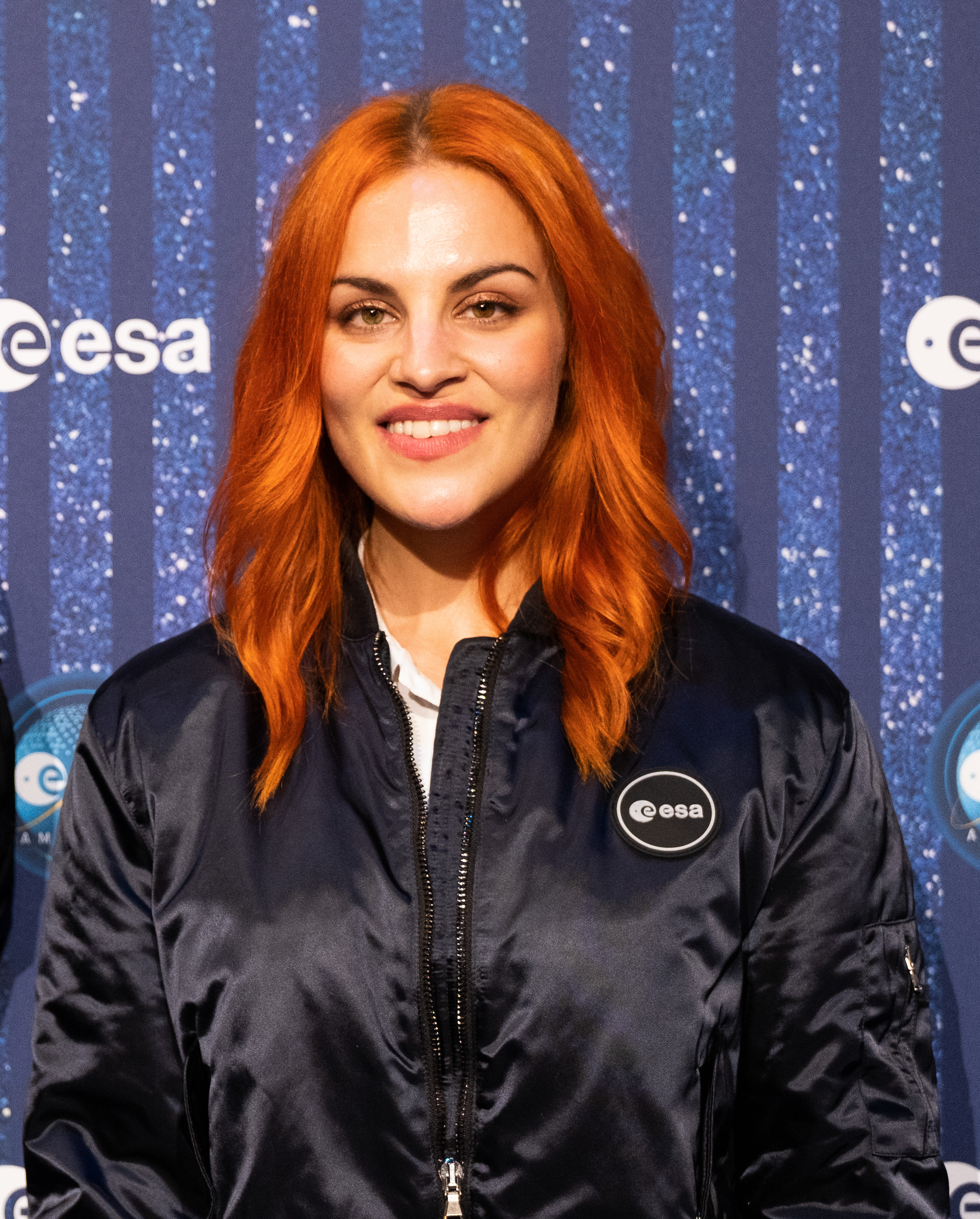
- García Alonso in 2022
- Born: 1989 (age 36–37); León, Spain
- Education: University of León (BS, MD); University of Salamanca (PhD)
- Occupation: Scientist
- Scientific career
- Workplaces: Spanish National Cancer Research Centre (2019–)
- Thesis: Anticuerpos conjugados a fármacos frente a receptores ErbB: Nuevas indicaciones y mecanismos de resistencia (2018)
- Space career

ESA reserve astronaut
- Selection: 2022 ESA Group

Sara García Alonso (born 1989) is a Spanish cancer researcher and reserve ESA astronaut. Since 2019, she has been a postdoctoral researcher at the Spanish National Cancer Research Centre. In 2022, she was chosen as a reserve astronaut in the European Astronaut Corps.

== Education and academic career ==
García attended University of León, where she earned a bachelor's degree in biotechnology in 2012 and a master's degree in biomedical and biological research in 2013.

As a doctoral candidate at University of Salamanca, García conducted research on cancer medicine as a university research assistant for the Spanish National Research Council. She earned a doctorate cum laude in the nuclear biology of cancer and translational medicine in the university's Cancer Research Centre in 2018, advised by Atanasio Pandiella Alonso. Her doctoral dissertation focused on mechanisms of resistance to antibody-drug conjugates in ErbB receptors (Note: The title of her doctoral dissertation, in Spanish, is: "Anticuerpos conjugados a fármacos frente a receptores ErbB: Nuevas indicaciones y mecanismos de resistencia".) and it won her the university's Outstanding Doctorate Award the following year.

Since 2019, she has been working as a postdoctoral researcher on drug discovery and experimental oncology at the Spanish National Cancer Research Centre, where she has led a project to discover drugs for lung cancer and pancreatic cancer in the laboratory of Mariano Barbacid. Her research has focused on RAF1 selective degraders as a therapeutic target, in order to combat certain forms of cancers. She participated in a 6-month training programme at IE Business School, in Madrid, in 2021. She has volunteered for the Spanish Association Against Cancer, a nonprofit organisation.

== Astronaut career ==
The European Space Agency (ESA) selected García as a reserve astronaut for the 2022 selection of astronauts of the European Astronaut Corps. García and fellow astronaut candidate Pablo Álvarez Fernández, both natives of León, Spain, are the first Spaniards selected by the ESA since Pedro Duque joined the European Astronaut Corps in 1992. They were selected from more than 22,500 candidates across Europe. As a reserve astronaut, García will continue her current job, and will begin training if found to be an ideal candidate for a future space mission.

== Personal life ==
García was born in León, Spain, in 1989. In addition to her biomedical research, she has worked as a personal trainer and a nutrition coach.
