= Pablo Álvarez Fernández =

Spanish astronaut

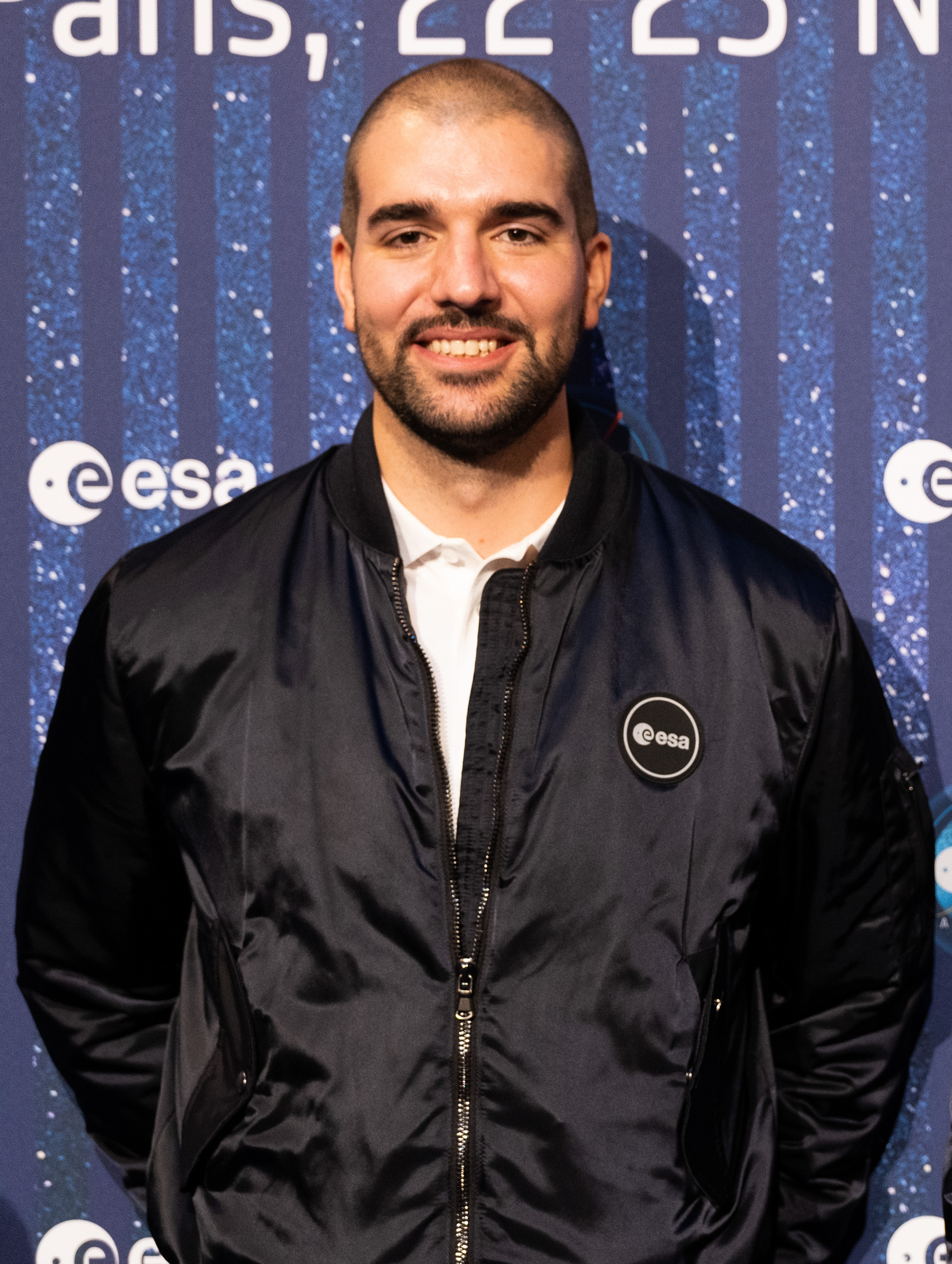
- Álvarez Fernández in 2022
- Born: 23 December 1988 (age 37); León, Spain
- Education: University of León (B.Eng); Warsaw University of Technology (M.Eng)
- Occupations: Engineer, Astronaut
- Scientific career
- Workplaces: Airbus (2020–)
- Space career

ESA astronaut
- Selection: 2022 ESA Group

Pablo Álvarez Fernández (born 1988) is a Spanish aeronautical engineer and astronaut. In November 2022, he was selected by the European Space Agency (ESA) as a full astronaut in the class of 2022 and it was in April 2024 when he graduated as such.

== Career ==
Born in León, his family comes from Omaña, specifically from Sabugo and Garueña. In 2009, he graduated in aeronautical engineering from the University of León and in 2011 he obtained a master's degree in aerospace engineering from the Warsaw Institute of Technology. Between 2011 and 2017 he worked as a structural engineer on several aviation programs for Airbus and Safran in Spain, the United Kingdom and France, where he was involved in projects such as the A350, the A380, the Boeing 777 and the COMAC C919.

Between 2017 and 2020 he worked as a mechanical architect for the Rosalind Franklin rover of the ExoMars mission at Airbus Defence and Space in the United Kingdom, where he was responsible of the design and development of the structure and the installation of the different scientific instruments with which the vehicle is equipped, as well as its integration into the landing platform, in addition to being a test director during the environmental test campaign. He also worked on the design, development and testing of the different seals of the ExoMars rover to avoid biological contamination.

In 2020, he joined Airbus Spain as a project manager. In November 2022, he was selected by the European Space Agency (ESA) as a member of its 2022 astronaut promotion, in which the Leonese Sara García Alonso was also selected.

On 22 April 2024, he graduated as an astronaut from the ESA in Cologne, where he trained for a year, among a class of more than 22,500 candidates. Thus, he became the second Spanish astronaut and the first in 31 years since the graduation of Pedro Duque in 1993.
