= Amelie Schoenenwald =

German biochemist

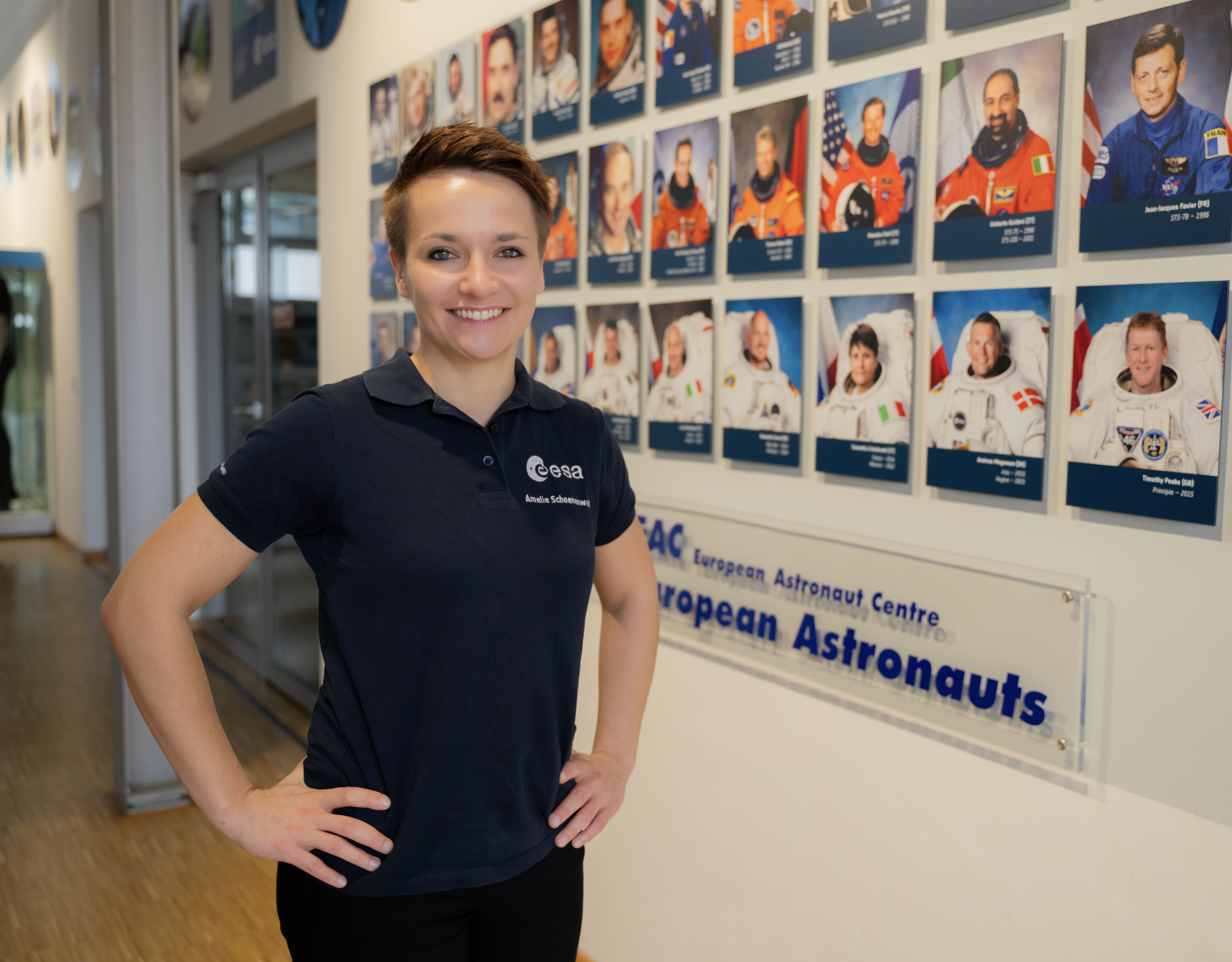
- Schoenenwald in 2024
- Born: 1989 (age 36–37); Landau an der Isar, West Germany
- Education: Technical University of Munich (BSc MSc MSc); Medical University of Vienna (PhD); Collège des Ingénieurs (MBA)
- Occupation: Scientist
- Scientific career
- Thesis: Engineering specific antibodies for Usutu virus (2020)
- Space career

ESA reserve astronaut
- Selection: 2022 ESA Group

Amelie Karin Josephine Schoenenwald (born 1989) is a German biochemist and reserve astronaut. She was chosen as a reserve astronaut in the European Astronaut Corps in 2022.

After studying at the Technical University of Munich from 2009 to 2015, Schoenenwald earned a PhD in integrative structural biology at the Medical University of Vienna in 2020. By the time of her selection as an astronaut, she had worked in industry for a few years.

== Early life ==
Amelie Karin Josephine Schoenenwald was born in 1989 in Germany. She is a native of Landau an der Isar, in Bavaria, Germany. In an interview for Passauer Neue Presse, Schoenenwald explained how she desired to become an astronaut when she was young, and read every space book available at the local library. She recounted that the more she got older, the more she felt her goal was unrealistic, which led her to initially pursue a different career path and study what interested her. She studied at the Technical University of Munich, where from 2009 to 2015, she earned three degrees: a bachelor's degree in molecular biotechnology, a master's degree in industrial biotechnology, and a master's degree in biochemistry.

== Career ==
Schoenenwald attended the Medical University of Vienna for a PhD in integrative structural biology. She was a member of the laboratory of Tim Skern at the Max Perutz Labs research centre, where she became a scientific project lead. In 2016, she was chosen as one of 120 candidates in the early stages of the private spaceflight programme Die Astronautin, which at the time aimed to send the first German woman to the International Space Station by 2020. During the second year of her PhD programme, in 2017, she received funding from the Howard Hughes Medical Institute to attend a course at Cold Spring Harbor Laboratory in New York. She completed her PhD in 2020, advised by Skern, writing her dissertation on "Engineering specific antibodies for Usutu virus".

Schoenenwald was employed as a scientist at a biotechnology start-up company and consulted for an Austrian-German private university in 2020, and from 2020 to 2021, she was a business development manager and process manager for a healthcare company based in Germany. She earned a Master of Business Administration from the Collège des Ingénieurs, a business school for European engineering graduates, in 2021. From 2021 to 2022, she worked for various German start-up companies as a part-time freelance worker and consultant.

Schoenenwald was chosen as a reserve astronaut in the European Astronaut Corps in November 2022. The 2022 group of astronauts comprised 16 other members, including five career astronauts, selected from a pool of 22,500 candidates. At the time, she was employed as a medical expert manager. In 2025, she was selected as a Karman Project Fellow for her work in space.
