= Helmut Hinghofer-Szalkay =

Austrian physiologist

Helmut G. Hinghofer-Szalkay (born January 22, 1948 in Graz) is an Austrian physiologist. He headed the Institute for Physiology, Karl Franzens University (from 2000) / Medical University Graz (2005–2013), was founder and director of a non-profit research lab (Institute for Adaptive and Spaceflight Physiology, 1994–2010). He is married to the artist Irma Michaela Szalkay and has two children.

== Life and career ==
Hinghofer-Szalkay started studying medicine in 1966 and graduated (Dr. med. univ.) from the Karl-Franzens-University in Graz 1974. After his Habilitation 1982 he was European Space Agency research fellow at the NASA Ames Research Center in Moffett Field, California (1984–85). In 1988 he was awarded tit. ao. Universitätsprofessor and became full professor in 1999.

Hinghofer-Szalkay organized the 3rd European Symposium on Life Sciences Research in Space 1987 in Graz and a Space Life Sciences Symposiums in Vienna 1992. He was principal investigator of an Austro-Russian experiment on MIR space station (Bodyfluids, 1991) and a consecutive experiment within the frame of the RLF program (current world record of a 14-month mission) 1994. He headed the 4th International Head-Out Water Immersion Symposium 1999 and the 15th International Astronautical Academy (IAA) Humans in Space Symposium in Graz 2005.

Hinghofer-Szalkay served as scientific director of the Styrian Academy of Dietetics 1993-2000, headed the Scientific Society of Physicians in Styria 2008-2010 and the Franz-Lanyar-Foundation 2002-2010. He was secretary of the Scientific Society of Physicians in Styria 1979-2010 and executive secretary of the Austrian Physiological Society 1979-1983 and 1997-2012.

== Awards ==
- Höchst-Award Graz 1978, 1980, 1986
- European Space Agency Fellow 1984/1985
- NASA Space Act Tech Brief Award - ARC-11686 (1986)
- Styrian Research Award 1993
- Member, council of trustees, International Society for Gravitational Physiology 1998
- Juri-Gagarin-Decoration 1999
