= Tibor Kapu =

Hungarian astronaut

- Kapu Tibor
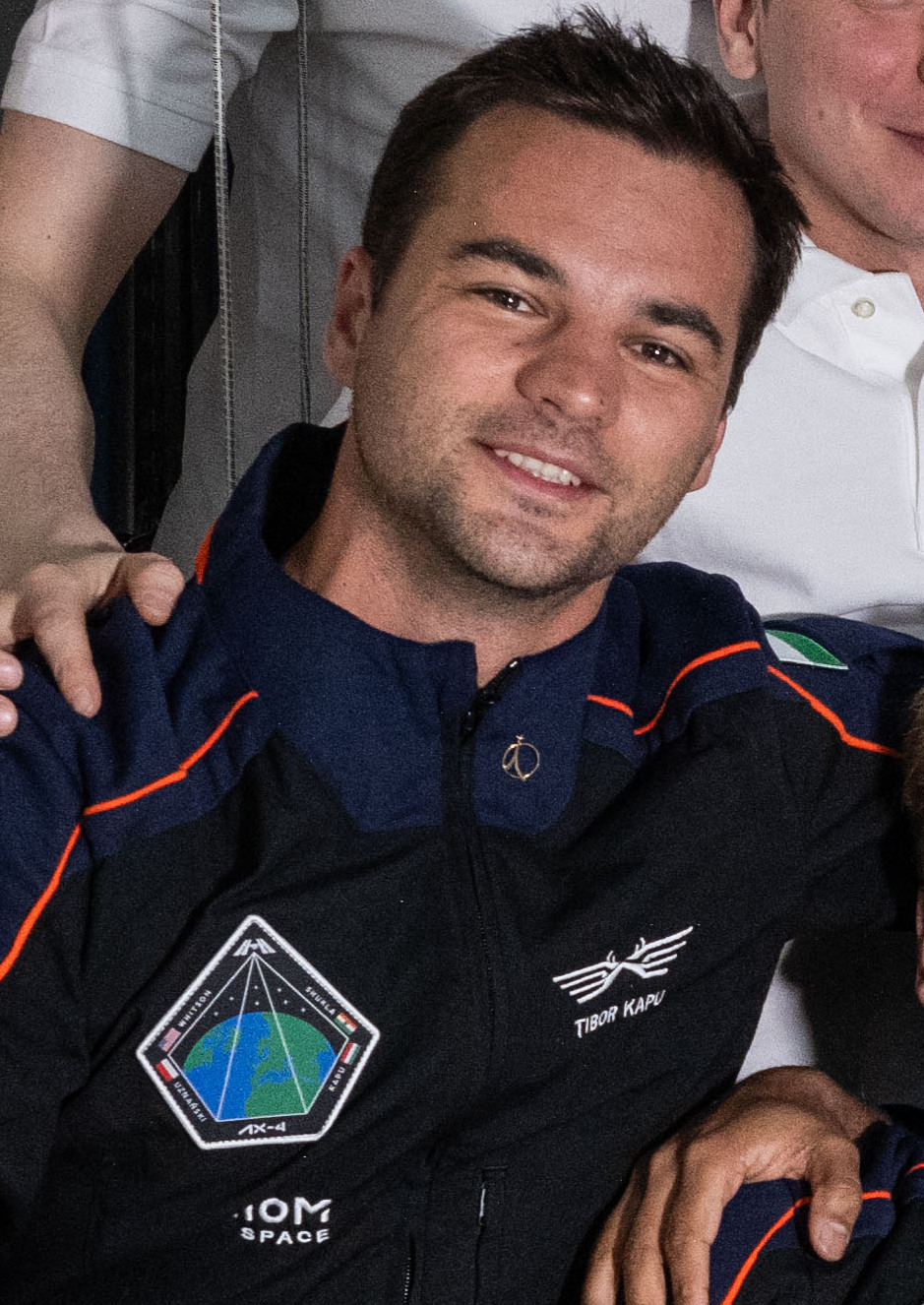
- Kapu aboard the ISS in 2025
- Born: 5 November 1991 (age 34); Vásárosnamény, Hungary
- Education: Budapest University of Technology and Economics (ME)
- Occupations: Astronaut; Mechanical engineer
- Space career

Commercial astronaut
- Time in space: 20 days, 2 hours and 59 minutes
- Selection: HUNOR 1 (2024)
- Missions: Axiom Mission 4

Tibor Kapu (Hungarian: Kapu Tibor) (born 5 November 1991) is a Hungarian mechanical engineer and astronaut. He flew to the International Space Station as a mission specialist on Axiom Mission 4 (Ax-4), which launched on 25 June 2025. Kapu became the third Hungarian to participate in a spaceflight, following Bertalan Farkas in 1980 and Charles Simonyi in 2007. His spaceflight is organized by the Hungarian state in cooperation with the American space company Axiom Space.

== Personal life ==
Tibor Kapu was born on 5 November 1991, in Vásárosnamény, Hungary. He began his studies at the Krúdy Gyula Secondary Grammar School in Nyíregyháza, then followed his father's example and chose a career in mechanical engineering. He completed his bachelor and master studies at the Budapest University of Technology and Economics.

Kapu is a two-time World Junior Championship silver medalist in the logic game Tantrix.

== Astronaut career ==
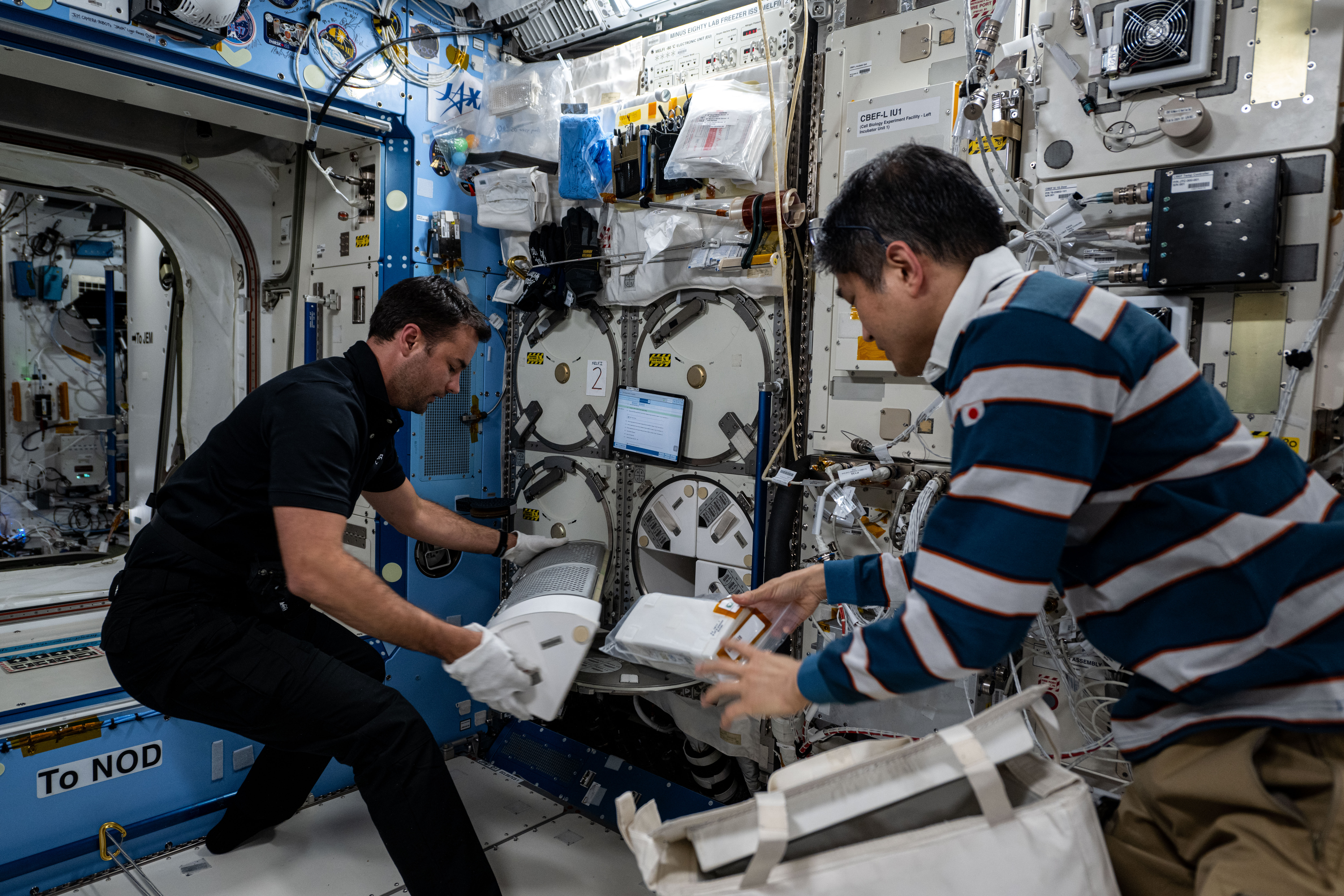
Kapu (left) loads a cryogenic storage unit into a freezer aboard the Kibō module with Expedition 73 Commander Takuya Onishi (right)

On 28 October 2021, the Hungarian government officially announced the HUNOR (Hungarian to Orbit) programme, which aims to send a Hungarian research astronaut into space for the second time after Bertalan Farkas's space flight in 1980. The application period for candidates was open until 31 January 2022.

He applied to the program on the last day of application period. In March 2023, he was selected into the group of four final candidates together with Gyula Cserényi, András Szakály and Ádám Schlégl. In total, more than 240 people applied for the nationwide astronaut selection process. Semmelweis University and the facilities at the Kecskemét Air Base of the Hungarian Defence Forces played a key role in the selection process.

Exactly 44 years after Farkas's launch on Soyuz 36, on 26 May 2024, Hungarian Minister of Foreign Affairs and Trade Péter Szijjártó announced that Kapu was selected to be the next Hungarian astronaut, with Gyula Cserényi being his backup.

On 24 July 2024, the Hungarian Ministry of Foreign Affairs published a press release stating that the agreement between Hungary and Axiom Space was finalized. It was also revealed by Orsolya Ferencz, Ministerial Commissioner for Space Research that Kapu Tibor would fly on the two-week-long Ax-4 mission.

On 2 August 2024, the Polish Space Agency (POLSA) published a press release, confirming the crew of Axiom Mission 4 and their roles. Kapu will be a mission specialist aboard the Crew Dragon during the 14-day long spaceflight.

Kapu and his backup, Cserényi, flew to Houston on 1 August 2024, to begin their mission-specific training, while the mission launched on 25 June 2025. He returned to Earth, splashing down into the Pacific Ocean near the coast of California, on July 15th; and returned to his home country of Hungary about a month later, on August 18th.
