= Private Astronaut Mission =

The Private Astronaut Mission (PAM) program is a NASA initiative that allows private operators to conduct crewed spaceflights to the International Space Station (ISS). The program was created to expand access to the ISS for commercial and international partners while NASA focuses on its primary Artemis program objectives.

As of June 2026, seven PAM missions have been announced. All missions to date have utilized the SpaceX Crew Dragon spacecraft.

== List of missions ==
Flight No.	Operator	Mission	Patch	Capsule	Launch	Return	Crew	Outcome
PAM-1	Axiom Space	Axiom Space-1		C206 Endeavour	8 April 2022	25 April 2022	United States Michael López-Alegría; United States Larry Connor; Israel Eytan Stibbe; Canada Mark Pathy	Success
PAM-1	First private flight to the ISS							
PAM-2	Axiom Space	Axiom Space-2		C212 Freedom	21 May 2023	31 May 2023	United States Peggy Whitson; United States John Shoffner; Saudi Arabia Ali AlQarni; Saudi Arabia Rayyanah Barnawi	Success
PAM-2	Second private flight to the ISS							
PAM-3	Axiom Space	Axiom Space-3		C212 Freedom	18 January 2024	9 February 2024	United States Michael López-Alegría; Italy Walter Villadei; Turkey Alper Gezeravcı; Sweden Marcus Wandt	Success
PAM-3	Third private flight to the ISS							
PAM-4	Axiom Space	Axiom Space-4		C213 Grace	25 June 2025	15 July 2025	United States Peggy Whitson; India Shubhanshu Shukla; Poland Sławosz Uznański-Wiśniewski; Hungary Tibor Kapu	Success
PAM-4	Fourth private flight to the ISS							
PAM-5	Axiom Space	Axiom Space-5			NET January 2027	NET January 2027	To be announced To be announced To be announced To be announced	Planned
PAM-5	Fifth private flight to the ISS							
PAM-6	Vast	Vast-PAM-1			NET July 2027	NET July 2027	France Thomas Pesquet; Czechia Aleš Svoboda; Greece Adrianos Golemis; To be announced	Planned
PAM-6	Sixth private flight to the ISS							
PAM-7	Voyager Technologies	VOYG-1			NET January 2028	NET January 2028	To be announced To be announced To be announced To be announced	Planned
PAM-7	Seventh private flight to the ISS							
