= Haven-1 =

Planned space station

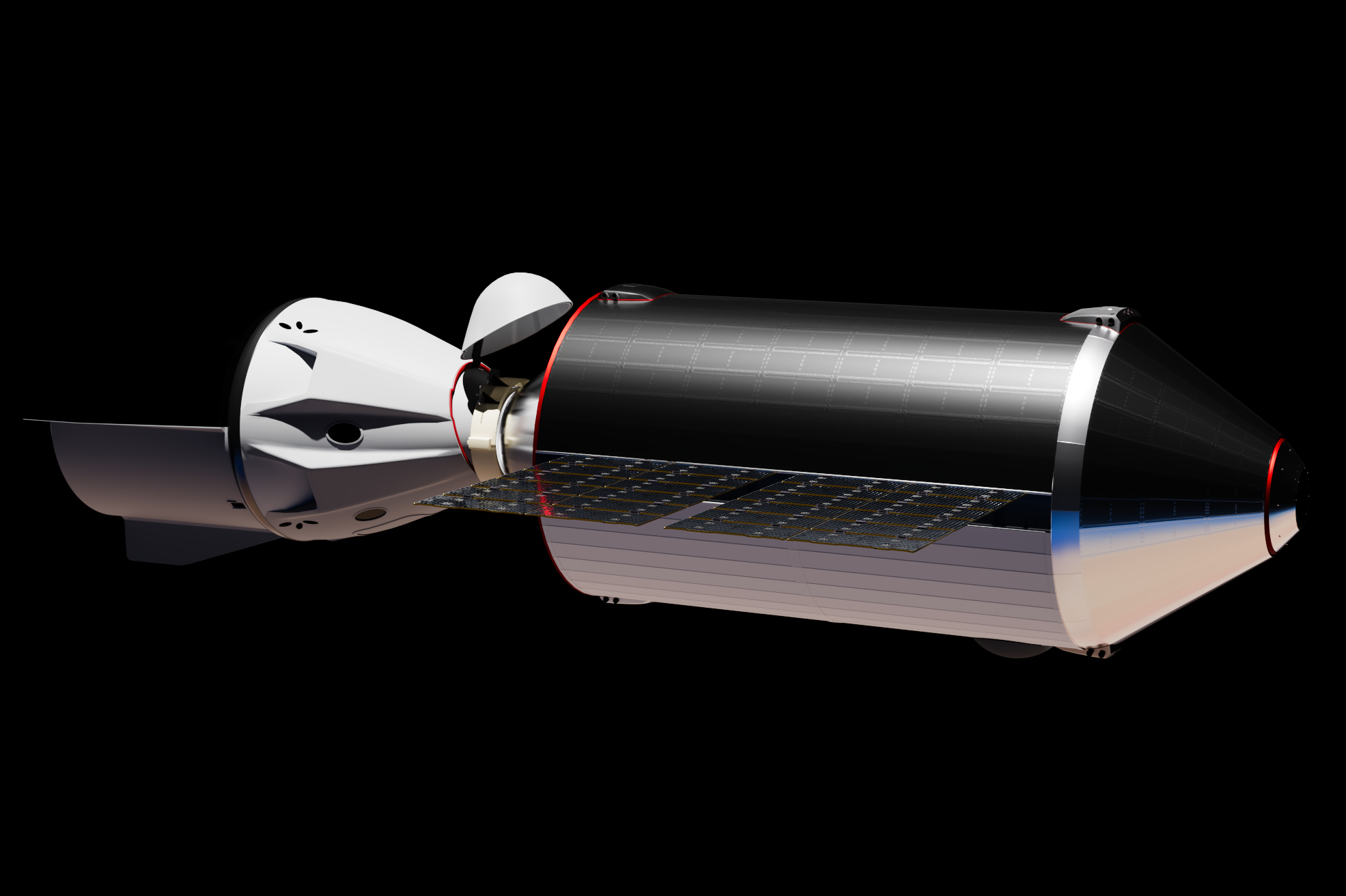
- Artist's rendering of Haven-1 in space, with a Crew Dragon spacecraft docked on its aft

Station statistics
- Crew: 4 (planned)
- Launch: NET Q1 2027 (planned)
- Carrier rocket: Falcon 9 Block 5 (planned)
- Mission status: In development
- Mass: 14,000 kg (31,000 lb)
- Length: 10.1 m (33 ft)s
- Diameter: 4.4 m (14 ft)
- Pressurised volume: 45 m^{3} (1,600 ft^{3})
- Orbital inclination: 51.6°
- Typical orbit altitude: 425 km (264 mi)
- Days in orbit: ~3 years (planned)
- Days occupied: 10–30 days (planned)

Haven-1 is a planned space station in low Earth orbit that is in development by American aerospace company Vast. It is planned to be launched in the first quarter of 2027 atop a SpaceX Falcon 9, and will be the first ever commercial space station. The first mission to Haven-1, Vast-1, is expected to launch a crew of four astronauts on board a Crew Dragon spacecraft to the space station for thirty days. More launches are expected to occur using Crew Dragon to shuttle astronauts to and from Haven-1 over the course of its lifespan.

With 45 m^{3} (1,600 ft^{3}) of habitable volume, the station will be unable to sustain itself over a long period of time and will rely on the Crew Dragon for long-term missions by using its life support systems. Using Dragon, the station will be capable of sustaining 4-crew missions with 24/7 communication facilities, up to 1,000 watts of power, up to 150 kg (330 lb) of preloaded cargo mass, and science, research, and in-space manufacturing opportunities for up to 30 days at a time.

The crews aboard the station will also conduct experiments in an attempt to mimic lunar gravity.

== Components ==
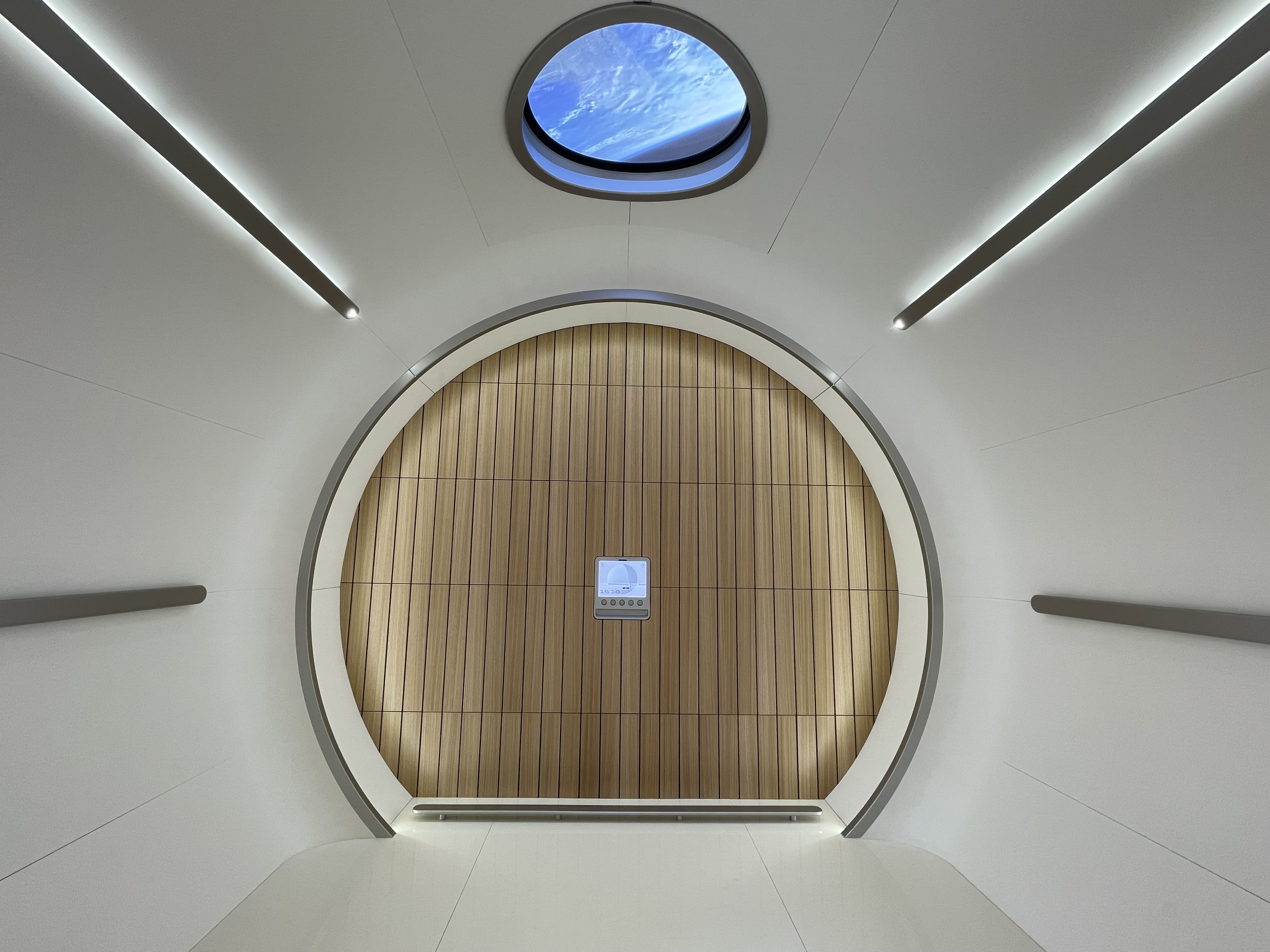
Haven-1 interior mockup

Haven-1's propulsion system is being built and provided by Impulse Space. The propulsion system will consist of a storable propellant combination, nitrous oxide and ethane, propellant tanks, fluid lines, valves, sensors, control electronics and software, and Saiph thrusters as a reaction control thruster. The station will also contain a dome for photography and viewing of the Earth for tourists, in addition to always-on internet through onboard Wi-Fi and resting rooms. There will be no on-board bathroom on Haven-1, with astronauts and tourists having to use the one on the Dragon they arrived on.

In mid-February 2024, Vast announced that it was partnering with El Segundo-based company AnySignal, Irvine-based company TRL11, and Singaporean company Addvalue to provide radio frequency and Inter-satellite Data Relay System connectivity, as well as advanced onboard video solutions for use in Haven-1.

In August 2024, Vast revealed that Haven-1 will house a microgravity research facility called the Haven-1 Lab, which will serve as the station's microgravity research, development and manufacturing platform. It will have 10 slots, each capable of accommodating payloads weighing up to 30 kg (66 lb) and consuming up to 100 watts of power, previously provided by private companies and governments. The first companies to agree to place payloads on Haven-1 have been announced as Redwire and Yuri Gravity. In April 2025, Japan Manned Space Systems Corporation (JAMSS), Interstellar Lab and Exobiosphere were also announced as payload partners for Haven-1.

On June 24, 2026, Vast announced that they had signed a series of memorandums of understanding with private partners - the Sanford Stem Cell Institute, the University of California San Diego, Auxilium Biotechnologies, LambdaVision, and BioOrbit - to host their research on Haven-1 and Haven-2.

== Development ==
Vast's CEO Max Haot has routinely described Haven-1 as a "minimum viable product", or proof of concept, of a space station. Haven-1 is meant to demonstrate the feasibility of Vast's life support systems, thermal control, air revitalization, pressure relief, and fire suppression ahead of Haven-2.

The hull of the space station had begun its final weld of construction on October 8, 2025. With a launch mass of approximately 14,000 kg (31,000 lb), it will become the heaviest spacecraft ever put into orbit by a Falcon 9 rocket. On January 20, 2026, Haven-1 began its assembly for launch.

Unlike Haven-2 which is funded by a NASA contract, Haven-1 is entirely privately funded, and since its completion in 2025 been fully paid for. Until January 20, 2026, Haven-1 was scheduled to launch in late 2026, however, this would be delayed to the first quarter of 2027. In June the thermal control system was integrated while its in-house electric hall thruster started its vacuum testing.

== Mission ==
Haven-1 is designed with a three-year lifespan in orbit, which is able to support a total of four short-duration astronaut crews arriving in Crew Dragon spacecraft. Each expedition, starting with Vast-1, will have four crewmembers staying at the station for a total of 10–30 days per flight but will typically consists of two weeks at the station. Vast's CEO Max Haot stated that the station will undergo a series of verification events including an unmanned docking of a Dragon 2 before the first manned crew is sent on Vast-1. Haot stated that this verification process could take anywhere from two weeks to three years.

== See also ==
- Vast (company)
- Vast-1
