= Vast-PAM-1 =

Planned private SpaceX mission to the ISS

PAM-6
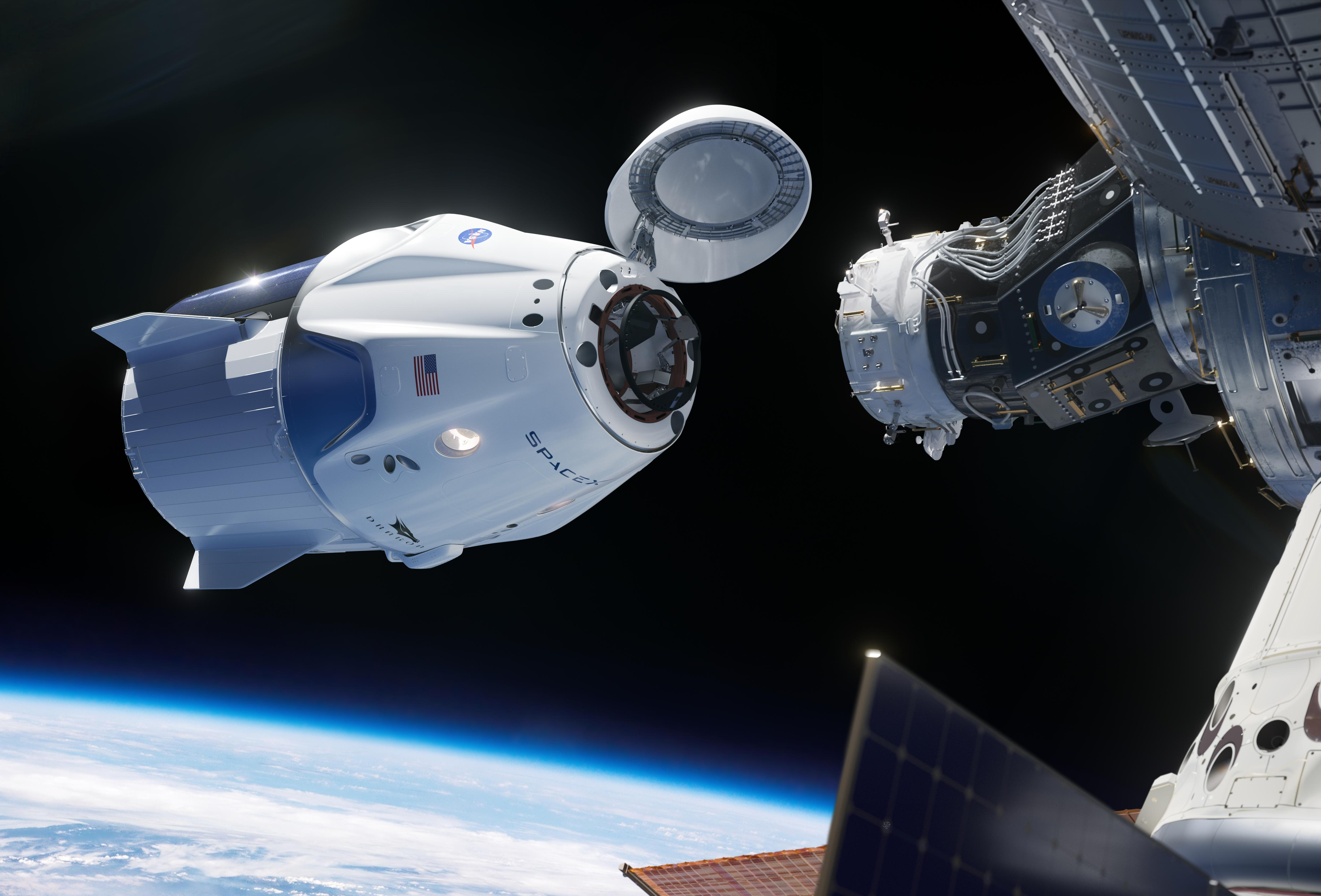
- Artists' impression of a Crew Dragon approaching the forward port of Harmony on the ISS.
- Mission type: Private spaceflight to the ISS
- Operator: Vast; SpaceX
- Mission duration: up to 14 days (planned)

Spacecraft properties
- Spacecraft: Crew Dragon
- Spacecraft type: Crew Dragon
- Manufacturer: SpaceX

Crew
- Crew size: 4
- Members: Thomas Pesquet; Aleš Svoboda; Adrianos Golemis; TBA

Start of mission
- Launch date: NET July 2027
- Rocket: Falcon 9 Block 5
- Contractor: SpaceX

Orbital parameters
- Reference system: Geocentric orbit
- Regime: Low Earth orbit

Docking with ISS
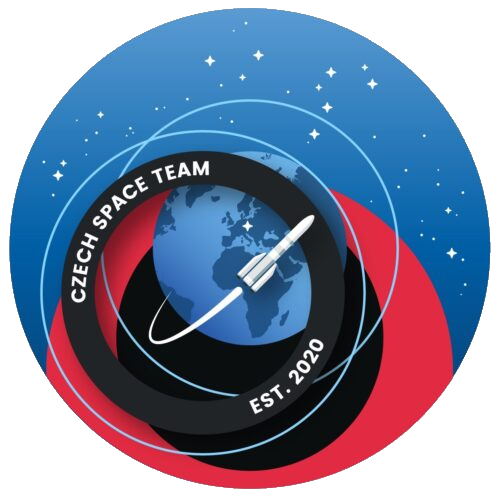
- Patch of Czech Space Team, the organizer of 'Czech Journey to Space' Vast missions Crew Dragon flights

Vast-PAM-1 (provisional name, Private Astronaut Mission-6) is a crewed spaceflight mission of the Crew Dragon spacecraft operated by the American company SpaceX to the International Space Station (ISS), flown on behalf of Vast. The launch is planned for summer 2027 at the earliest. It will be the sixth private mission to the International Space Station, but the first for Vast, with the previous five having been organized by Axiom Space. The mission is planned to last up to 14 days.

== Crew ==
The mission will carry one professional commander, Thomas Pesquet, who has already stayed aboard the ISS, and three private or government astronauts. Two of whom will be fellow ESA astronauts Aleš Svoboda from the Czech Republic and Adrianós Golémis of Greece.

Position	Astronaut
Commander	Thomas Pesquet, ESA; Third spaceflight
Pilot	Aleš Svoboda, ESA; First spaceflight
Mission specialist	Adrianos Golemis, ESA; First spaceflight
Mission specialist	TBA

== Czech Journey to Space ==
The "Czech Journey to Space" is a long term project announced by Prime Minister Petr Fiala in June 2024 to send a Czech astronaut to the ISS to highlight and draw investment towards the Czech Republic's growing space industry. To this end, he empowered the "Czech Space Team", a group founded in 2020 focused on getting Czech experiments to the ISS, to oversee coordination between the Ministry of Transport, Ministry of Defense, Czech Academy of Sciences, and private investors towards the Journey. Support for the program polled at ~90% positive in March 2026 and has led to an increased interest in space among both the general public and private companies.

Aleš Svoboda, a Gripen fighter pilot for the Czech Air Force, was selected as a reserve astronaut for the ESA in 2022. The Czech government signed a memorandum of understanding with Vast in 2024 to fly a Czech Astronaut to the ISS. On 8 June 2026, the Czech government confirmed that Svoboda would fly to the International Space Station on the PAM-6 mission.

=== Experiments ===
Svoboda will perform 13 experiments and activities designed by Czech researchers and supported by ESA.

- CONREX (Technical University of Ostrava, TRL Space) – microscopic robots for removing bacterial biofilms
- CANCER (Masaryk Memorial Cancer Institute in Brno) – monitoring circulating DNA
- ISS T-Shirt (Masaryk University, Technical University of Ostrava) – garment-integrated sensors for monitoring physiological indicators
- AstroMoWe (Czech Technical University, University of West Bohemia, G.L. Electronic, Textile Research Institute VÚB) – wearable electronics for monitoring muscle and movement activity
- PUMR-B (Palacký University, S.A.B. Aerospace) – bioreactor for growing barley in microgravity
- METRO (Czech Technical University, Czech Academy of Sciences) – control of gas transfer in microgravity for long-term operation of space photobioreactors growing microalgae
- CryoAlgae (Charles University) – use of extremophile algae for production of fatty acids
- AstroDesmus (Mendel University) – testing resistance of Desmodesmus armatus to simulated martian chlorates for biomining and bioremediation
- ICARUS ARMOR Next Gen (UptimAI, Brno University of Technology, Mendel University, Charles University) – creating a digital twin of an astronaut for predicting cognitive performance and optimizing workloads
- PROTOCELL (Czech Academy of Sciences) – formation of protocells in microgravity for origin of life research
- ZOE (Czech Academy of Sciences) – development of chicken embryos in microgravity and increased radiation
- CZPAD (Czech Academy of Sciences) – personal active dosimeter
- EDOUTA (Planetum, ESA) – extensive educational program including broadcasts from ISS, educational videos, virtual reality, and art projects

== French mission ==
On June 2, 2026, it was announced that French ESA astronaut Thomas Pesquet would join the crew of Vast's PAM mission as mission commander for his third overall spaceflight. At the International Space Summit, an effort by the French government to highlight domestic French and European space capabilities, Pesquet announced that his mission would serve as a stepping stone for the ESA to develop access to smaller private stations, the Indian Space Station or a potential European Space Station and to help develop interest in a domestic European launch system. Starting on September 9 Pesquet would begin his mission training. As of September 12, the French CNES is running an online competition to determine the name of Pesquet's mission to the ISS.

== See also ==
- Vast-1
- List of human spaceflights to the International Space Station
- List of European Space Agency programmes and missions
- International Space Summit
