= Jessica Wittner =

Naval aviator and NASA astronaut

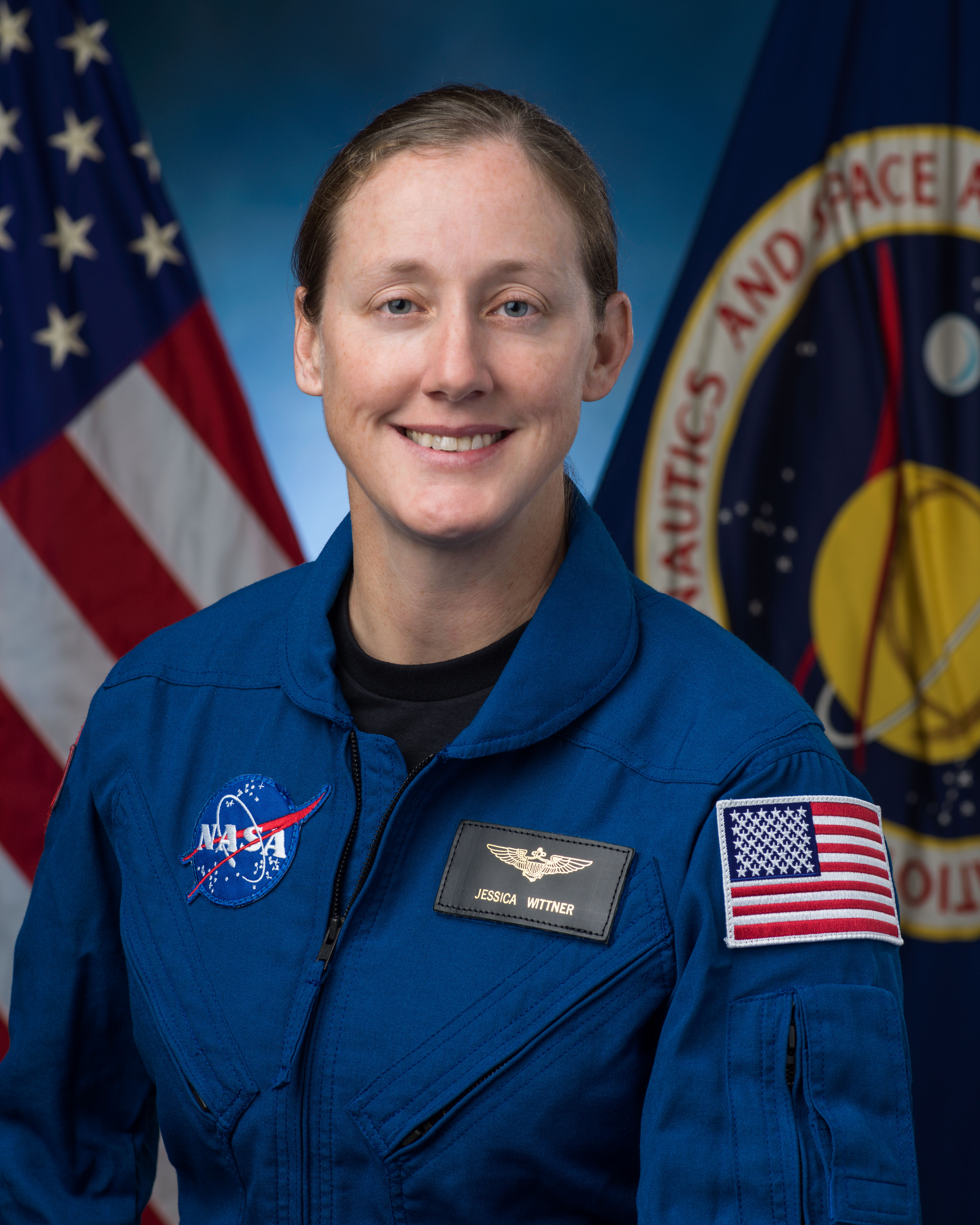
- Wittner in December 2021
- Born: Jessica Owens; March 29, 1983 (age 43); Fresno, California, U.S.
- Education: University of Arizona (BS); Naval Postgraduate School (MS)
- Space career

NASA astronaut
- Selection: NASA Group 23 (2021)
- Military career
- Branch: United States Navy
- Years: 2001–present
- Rank: Lieutenant commander
- Unit: Strike Fighter Squadron 151

Jessica Wittner (née Owens; born March 29, 1983) is a lieutenant commander in the United States Navy and NASA astronaut.

== Life ==
Wittner is a native of California with a distinguished career serving on active duty as a naval aviator and test pilot. As a teenager she joined the Naval Sea Cadet Corps, where she attained the highest rank, Chief Petty Officer. She holds a Bachelor of Science in aerospace engineering from the University of Arizona, and a Master of Science in aerospace engineering from the U.S. Naval Postgraduate School. Wittner was commissioned as a naval officer through an enlisted-to-officer program and has served operationally flying F/A-18 fighter jets with Strike Fighter Squadron 34 based out of Naval Air Station Oceana in Virginia, and Strike Fighter Squadron 151 based out of Naval Air Station Lemoore, not far from where she grew up in Central California. A graduate of U.S. Naval Test Pilot School, she also worked as a test pilot and project officer with Air Test and Evaluation Squadron 31 at Naval Air Weapons Station China Lake in California.

On December 6, 2021, Wittner was formally announced as a NASA astronaut candidate with NASA Astronaut Group 23.

In 2023, Wittner participated in the ESA PANGAEA training organized by the European Space Agency, held between Italy (Bletterbach canyon), Germany (Noerdlingen-Ries crater) and Spain (Lanzarote Island) together with the colleagues Thomas Pesquet and Takuya Onishi.
