= ESA PANGAEA =

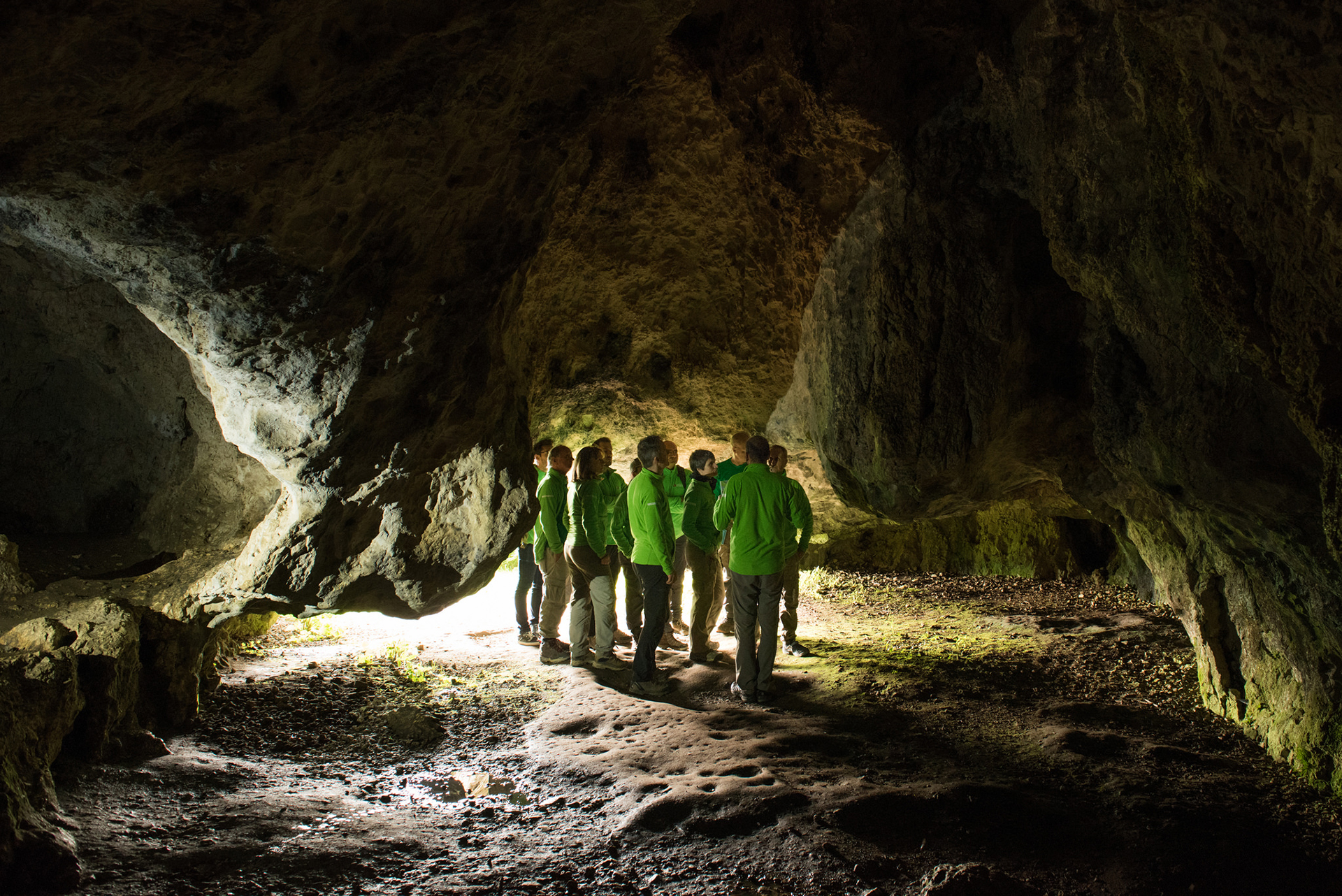
Participants on ESA’s Pangaea geology course visiting the Ries crater in Germany

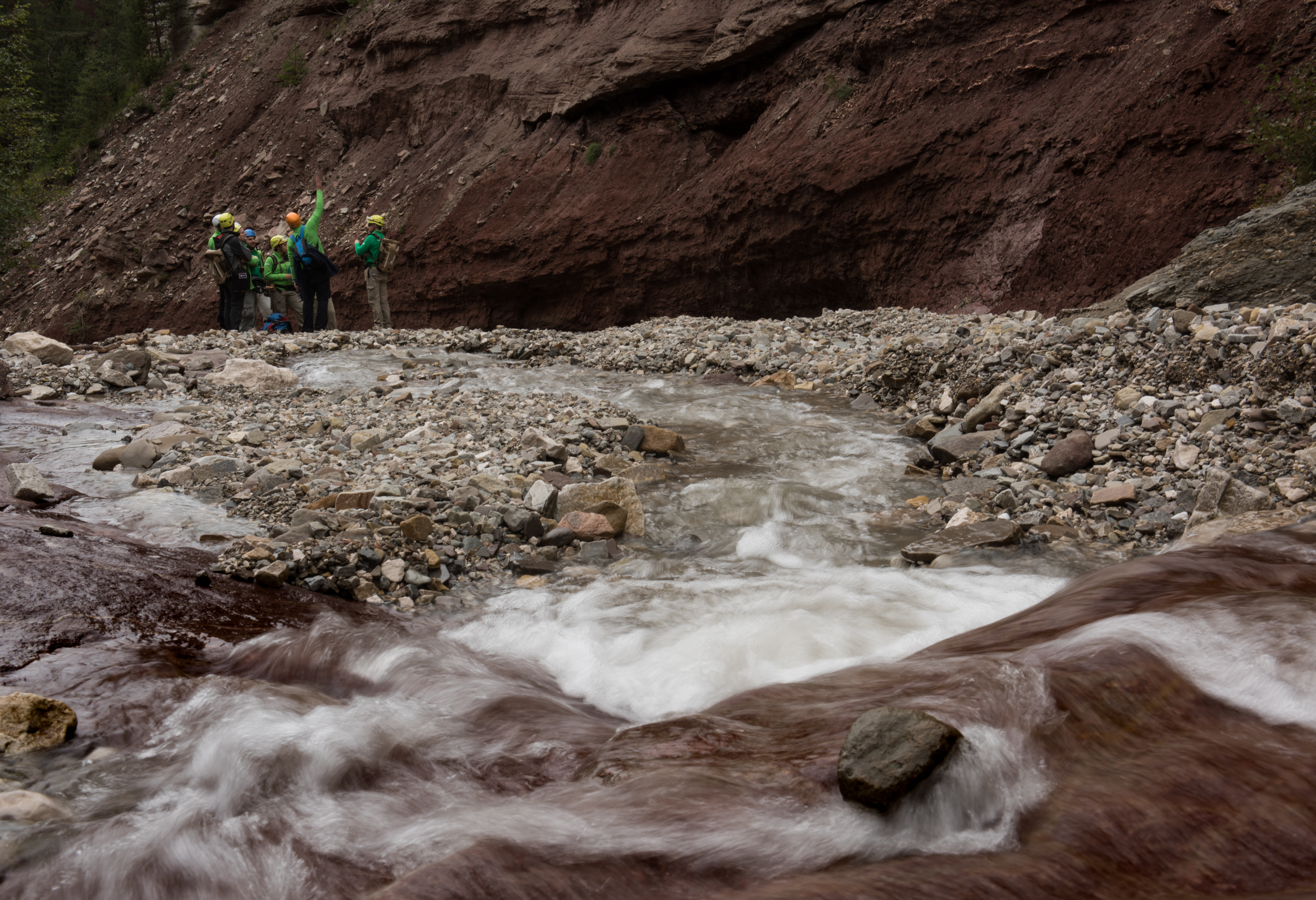
ESA astronaut Samantha Cristoforetti and other Pangaea course participants on a field trip to the Italian Dolomites

PANGAEA (Planetary Analogue Geological and Astrobiological Exercise for Astronauts) is an astronaut training course developed by the European Space Agency (ESA). It provides foundational knowledge and skills primarily in field geology to prepare astronauts for advanced mission-specific training for Moon and Mars missions. PANGAEA also incorporates the development and testing of technologies to support planetary exploration.

== Field training locations ==
During the PANGAEA course, trainees travel to several terrestrial locations that are analogous to some of the geological environments on the Moon and Mars.

=== Bletterbach Canyon, Italy ===
Bletterbach Canyon is part of the Italian Dolomites region. Here, PANGAEA trainees learn the basics of field geology, with some focus on terrestrial and Martian sedimentary geological and surface processes. This is aided by the presence of geological features within the canyon, such as gypsum veins, sedimentary deposits (e.g., fossilised rivers and seabeds) and volcanic bodies, which are analogous to similar features observed on Mars. The Bletterbach Canyon portion of the PANGAEA course is made possible due to collaboration with the GEOPARC Bletterbach team.

=== Nördlinger Ries Crater, Germany ===
Nördlinger Ries Crater is an approximately 15 million years old impact crater located in western Bavaria, Germany. Here, PANGAEA instructors use the crater to teach trainees about the rocks and minerals created by such impacts (e.g., shocked quartz), and the large-scale structure of such locations. Impact craters are ubiquitous on the Moon and Mars; therefore, it is important that astronauts are familiar with them. The Apollo 14 and 17 astronauts also studied the geology of Nördlinger Ries crater in 1970. The training at Ries Crater is made possible with the help of the Rieskrater Museum.

=== Lanzarote, Spain ===
Lanzarote is a small volcanic island off the coast of West Africa, with numerous volcanic edifices, lava flows, and lava tubes, similar to those seen on the Moon and Mars. Here, PANGAEA trainees study primary igneous minerals, alteration minerals, and practice operational concepts, such as geological traverses and sampling techniques in coordination with remote science teams. The samples collected during several of these geological traverses have real scientific value, and are sent to researchers to help understand more about these environments. The Lanzarote based portion of the PANGAEA course is made possible due to collaboration with the Cabildo of Lanzarote, the Lanzarote and Chinijo Islands UNESCO GEOPARC, and IGEO’s Laboratory of Geosciences.

=== Lofoten, Norway ===
Lofoten is an archipelago in northern Norway. The region contains rare anorthosite formations, a major constituent of the lunar highlands. In this location, astronauts have the opportunity to deepen their knowledge on intrusive rocks with a special focus on the evolution of the primary crust and mantle of the Moon. The training session is designed around a series of geological traverses with increasing complexity and crew autonomy. This part of PANGAEA has been developed with the support of the Norwegian Mining Museum in Oslo.

== Technology development and testing ==
Several technologies support PANGAEA's core training focus, and have been evolved into other projects outside the training. An example of this is the Electronic Field Book (EFB), which supports the course’s core training activities whilst being developed for use in future planetary exploration. The EFB is a field support tool that uses a range of portable devices to collect and integrate astronaut’s observations, such as photos and notes, with maps, 3D models, real-time positioning, voice-chat, and data from an array of external sensors, and provides it to the ground team who are then able to interacted with the data to provide remote support. The EFB also integrates a mineral recognition system developed within the PANGAEA team for the automatic interpretation of results from portable spectrometers in real-time using machine learning techniques and bespoke databases to provide enhanced decision-support.

PANGAEA has also acted as a testing ground for technologies developed outside of the core team. In 2023, NASA and ESA collaborated to test the HULC (Handheld Universal Lunar Camera) system during the PANGAEA training, the next camera to be taken to the Moon during the Artemis missions. PANGAEA has also run separate campaigns focused exclusively on technology development. PANGAEA-X ran for five days in November 2017 and 2018, during each it mobilised up to 50 people, four space agencies, and 18 organisations. Some of the main categories of technology tested during PANAGAEA-X are listed below:

- Robotic teleoperations
- Autonomous Drones and Rovers
- 3D mapping
- Tools (e.g., SPLIT and mobiPV)
- Subsurface mapping

== PANGAEA participants ==
PANGAEA has trained astronauts from ESA, NASA, JAXA, and Roscosmos, including several from the Artemis Team.

Course	Participants	Note	Ref
PANGAEA 2016	Luca Parmitano	ESA astronaut	
PANGAEA 2016	Matthias Maurer	ESA astronaut	
PANGAEA 2016	Pedro Duque	ESA astronaut	
PANGAEA 2017	Samantha Cristoforetti	ESA astronaut	
PANGAEA 2017	Hervé Stevenin	ESA EVA instructor	
PANGAEA 2017	Matthias Maurer	ESA astronaut	
PANGAEA 2017	Pedro Duque	ESA astronaut and engineer	
PANGAEA 2017	William Carrey	ESA robotics engineer	
PANGAEA 2017	Shahrzad Hosseini	ESA scientist	
PANGAEA 2018	Thomas Reiter	ESA astronaut	
PANGAEA 2018	Sergej Kud’-Sverčkov	Roscosmos cosmonaut	
PANGAEA 2018	Aidan Cowley	ESA science advisor and Spaceship EAC lead	
PANGAEA 2021-2022	Kathleen Rubins	NASA astronaut	
PANGAEA 2021-2022	Andreas Mogensen	ESA astronaut	
PANGAEA 2021-2022	Robin Eccleston	ESA research fellow	
PANGAEA 2022-2023	Stephanie Wilson	NASA astronaut	
PANGAEA 2022-2023	Alexander Gerst	ESA astronaut	
PANGAEA 2022-2023	Samantha Cristoforetti	ESA astronaut	
PANGAEA 2023	Jessica Wittner	NASA astronaut	
PANGAEA 2023	Thomas Pesquet	ESA astronaut	
PANGAEA 2023	Takuya Onishi	JAXA astronaut	
PANGAEA 2024	Rosemary Coogan	ESA astronaut	
PANGAEA 2024	Arnaud Prost	ESA astronaut	
PANGAEA 2024	Norishige Kanai	JAXA astronaut	
PANGAEA 2025	Thomas Pesquet	ESA astronaut	
PANGAEA 2025	Jessica Wittner	NASA astronaut	
PANGAEA 2025	Arnaud Prost	ESA reserve astronaut, in cooperation with CNES	
PANGAEA 2026	Pablo Álvarez Fernández	ESA astronaut	
PANGAEA 2026	Jasmin Moghbeli	NASA astronaut	
PANGAEA 2026	Kimiya Yui	JAXA astronaut	

== See also ==
- List of European Space Agency programmes and missions
- ESA CAVES
