= Thomas Pesquet =

French aerospace engineer, pilot, and astronaut

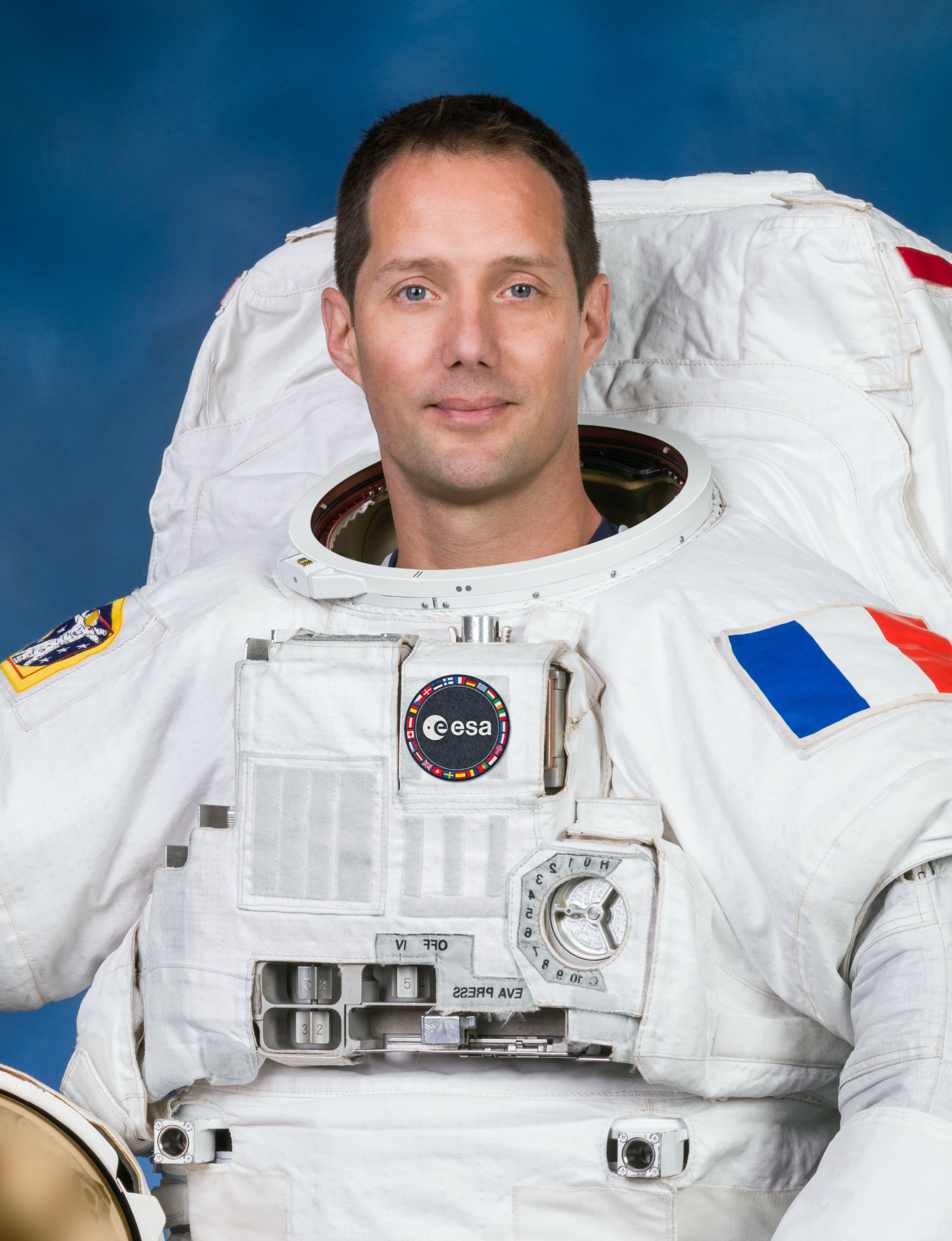
- Official portrait, 2020
- Born: Thomas Gautier Pesquet; 27 February 1978 (age 48); Rouen, Normandy, France
- Occupations: Astronaut; Engineer; Airline pilot
- Space career

ESA astronaut
- Status: Active
- Time in space: 396 days 11 hours 34 minutes
- Selection: 2009 ESA Group
- Total EVAs: 6
- Total EVA time: 39 hours, 54 minutes
- Missions: Soyuz MS-03 (Expedition 50/51) SpaceX Crew-2 (Expedition 65/66)
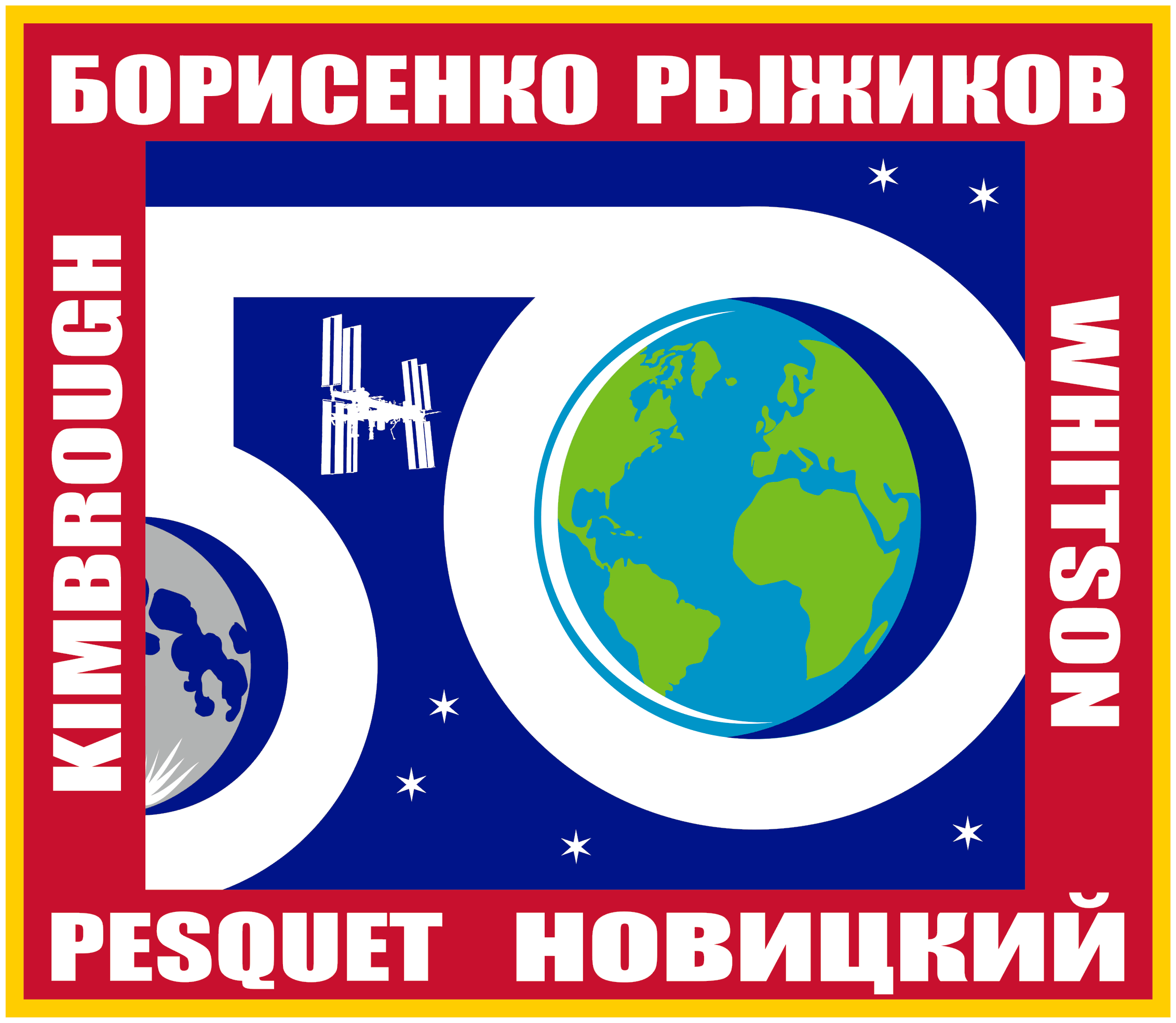
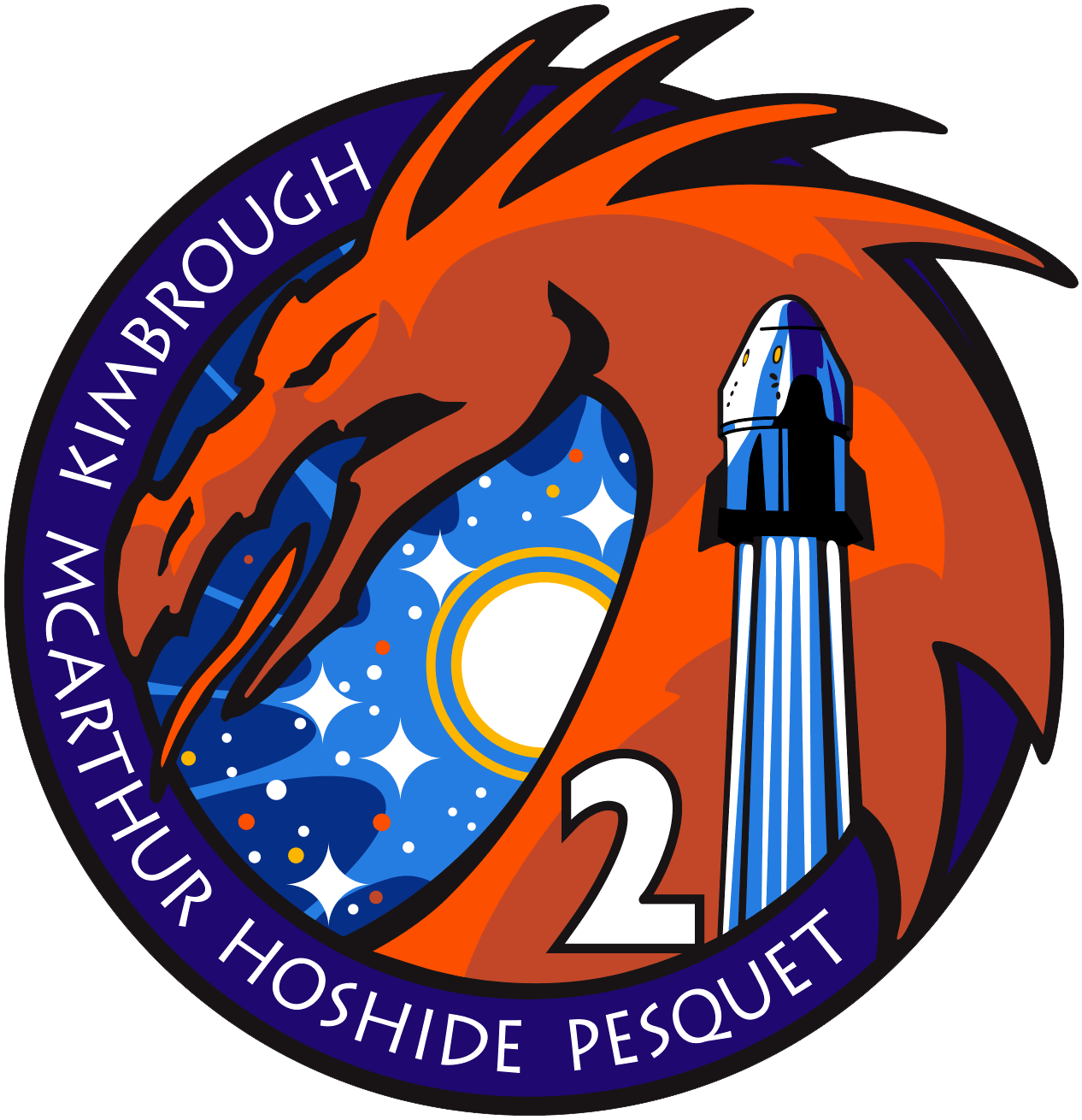
- Mission insignia
- Website: thomaspesquet.esa.int

Thomas Gautier Pesquet (French pronunciation: [tɔmɑ ɡotje pɛskɛ]; born 27 February 1978, is a French aerospace engineer, pilot, European Space Agency astronaut, actor, musician, and writer. He was selected by ESA as a candidate in May 2009, and successfully completed his basic training in November 2010. From November 2016 to June 2017, he was part of Expedition 50 and Expedition 51 on the International Space Station (ISS) as a flight engineer. Pesquet returned to space in April 2021 on board the SpaceX Crew Dragon for a second six-month stay on the ISS.

== Early life and education ==
Thomas Gautier Pesquet was born in Rouen, France, and considers Dieppe his hometown. He is the younger of two brothers.

Pesquet graduated from the Lycée Pierre Corneille in Rouen, France, in 1998.

In 2001, he received a master's degree from the École nationale supérieure de l'aéronautique et de l'espace in Toulouse, France, majoring in spacecraft design and control. He spent his final year before graduation at the École Polytechnique de Montréal, Canada, as an exchange student on the Aeronautics and Space Master.

Pesquet graduated from the Air France flight school in 2006, obtaining an Airline Transport Pilot License-Instrument Rating (ATPL-IR).

== Career ==
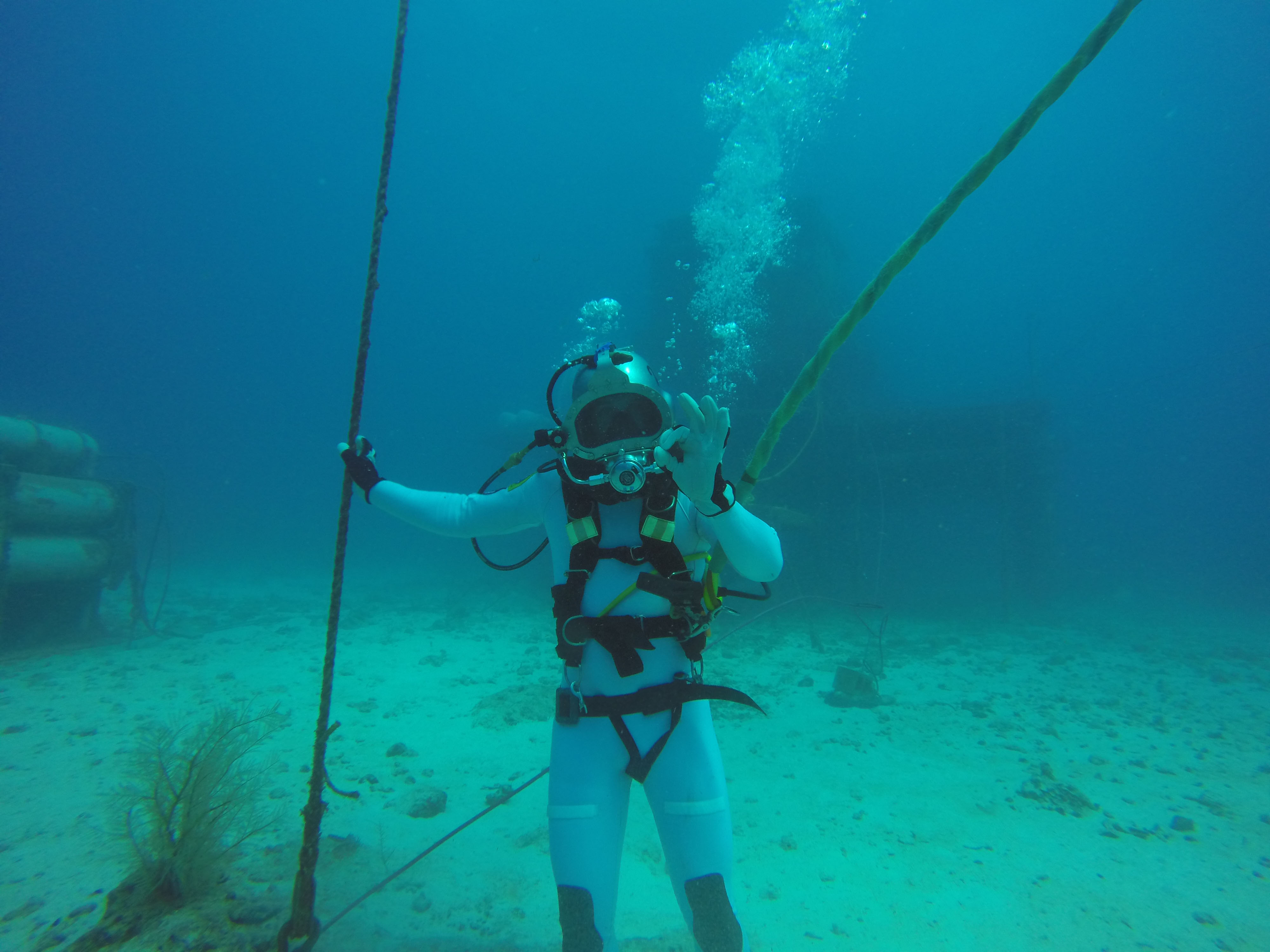
Pesquet training for NEEMO 18

From October 2001, Pesquet worked as a spacecraft dynamics engineer on remote sensing missions for GMV, S.A. in Madrid, Spain.

Between 2002 and 2004, Pesquet worked at the French space agency, CNES, as a research engineer on space missions autonomy. He also carried out various studies on future European ground segment design and European space technology harmonization. From late 2002, he was a representative of CNES at CCSDS, the Consultative Committee for Space Data Systems, working on the topic of cross-support between international space agencies.

A private pilot, he was selected in 2004 for Air France's flight training programme. He went on to become a commercial pilot for the French airline, where he started flying the Airbus A320 in 2006. He has logged more than 2000 hours flying time on various commercial airliners, and has qualified as a type-rating flight instructor on the A320, and as a Crew Resource Management instructor.

In 2018, Pesquet gained his Airbus A310 type rating and is qualified as a Novespace Zero-G aircraft pilot.

=== ESA ===
Pesquet was selected as a European Space Agency (ESA) astronaut in May 2009. He joined ESA in September 2009 and successfully completed Astronaut Basic Training in November 2010. Pesquet was the youngest member of the European Astronaut Corps, and the last of the ESA astronaut class of 2009 to arrive in space.

On 10 June 2014, NASA announced that Pesquet would serve as an aquanaut aboard the Aquarius underwater laboratory during the NEEMO 18 undersea exploration mission, which began on 21 July 2014 and lasted nine days. He has also taken part in ESA's CAVES underground course in 2011 and NASA's SEATEST II mission in 2013, furthering his experience in exploration.

From November 2016 to June 2017, Pesquet was part of Expedition 50 and Expedition 51 as a flight engineer. He was chosen by ESA for a six-month mission to the International Space Station starting in November 2016. He was also the backup to ESA astronaut Andreas Mogensen, who flew to the International Space Station on a 10-day flight in September 2015.

In 2023, Pesquet participated in the ESA PANGAEA training organized by the European Space Agency, held between Italy (Bletterbach canyon), Germany (Noerdlingen-Ries crater) and Spain (Lanzarote Island) together with the colleagues Takuya Onishi and Jessica Wittner.

==== Expedition 50/51 ====
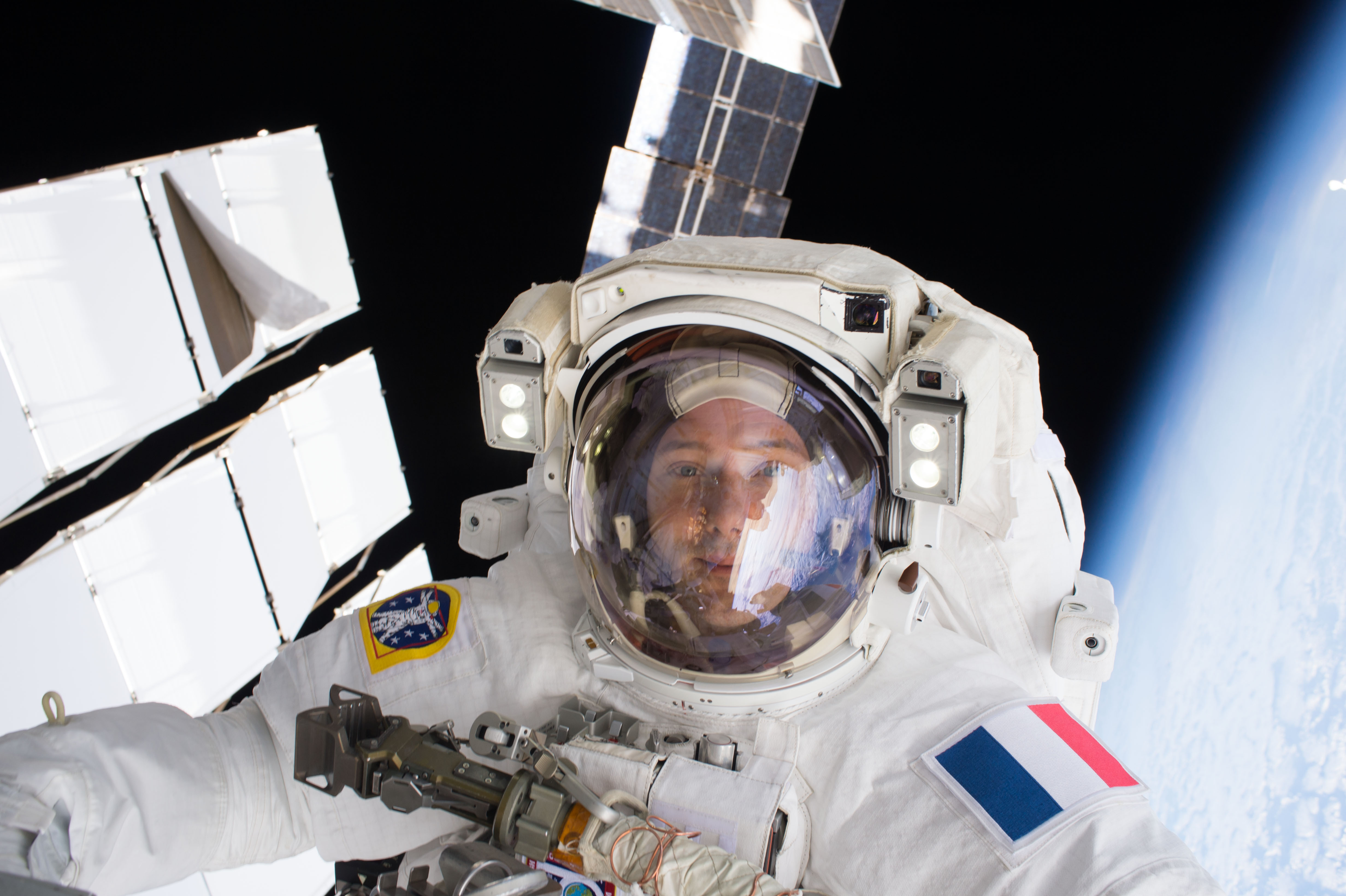
Pesquet during EVA on 13 January 13, 2017

Pesquet launched from the Baikonur Cosmodrome onboard Soyuz MS-03 on November 17, 2016. He spent six months on the International Space Station as part of Expedition 50/51. Arriving at the ISS on November 19, 2016, he was the first French astronaut since Léopold Eyharts helped install the Columbus European laboratory module during Expedition 16. His arrival marked the beginning of the European Proxima mission.

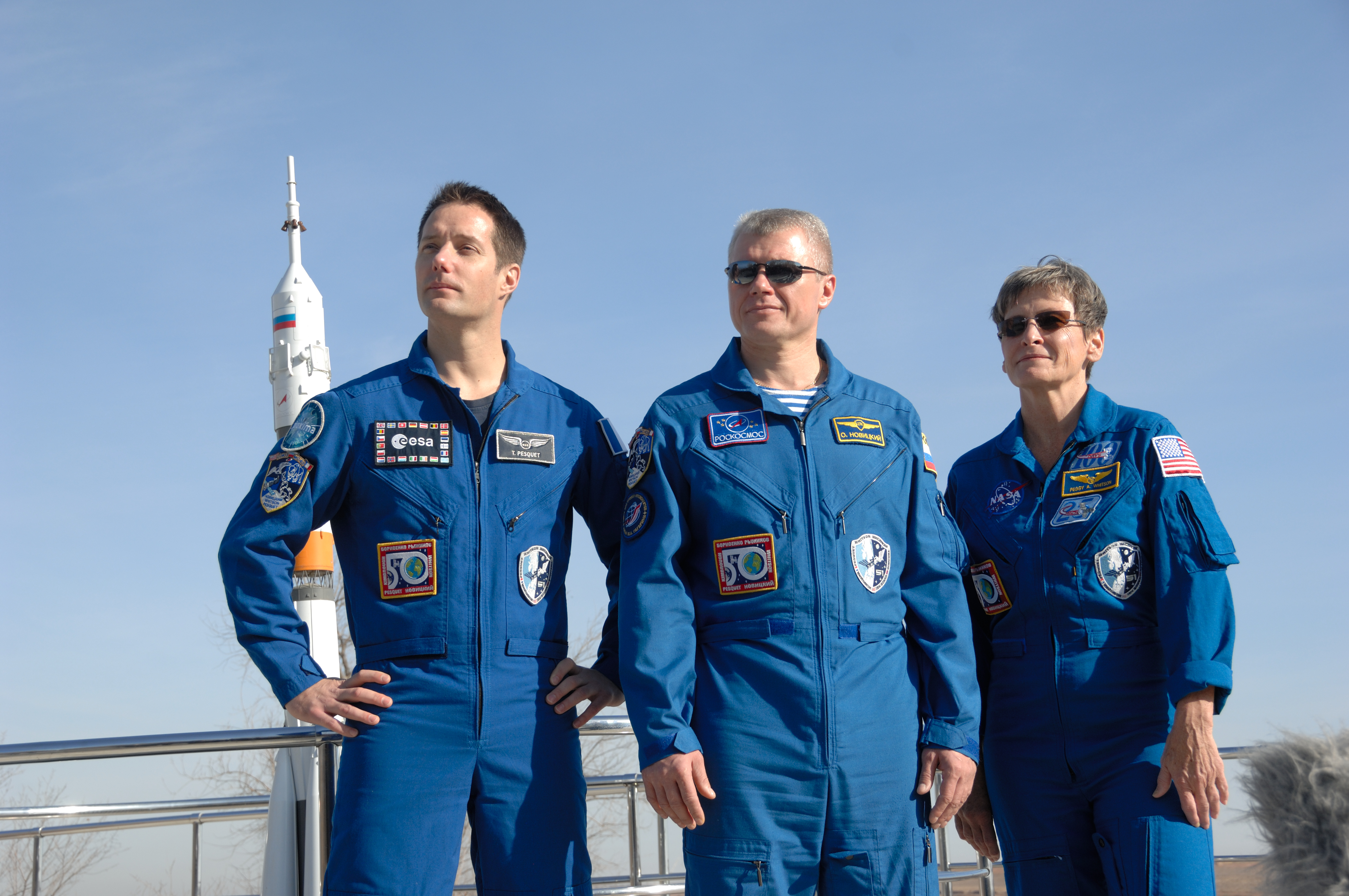
Pesquet and fellow crew members Oleg Novitsky and Peggy Whitson (left to right)

The Proxima mission included 50 science experiments for ESA and CNES. The mission was named after Proxima Centauri, continuing the French astronauts' tradition of naming the missions after stars and constellations. The X inside the logo symbolizes that Pesquet is the tenth French astronaut as well as the unknown. The Proxima mission name was chosen in a competition, with the winning name given by 13-year-old Samuel Planas from Toulouse, France. The mission logo was designed by Thomas Pesquet and Karen Oldenburg.

Pesquet performed his first EVA with astronaut Shane Kimbrough on January 13, 2017. During the EVA, they prepared the infrastructure to replace the ISS batteries. The EVA lasted for 5 hours and 58 minutes.

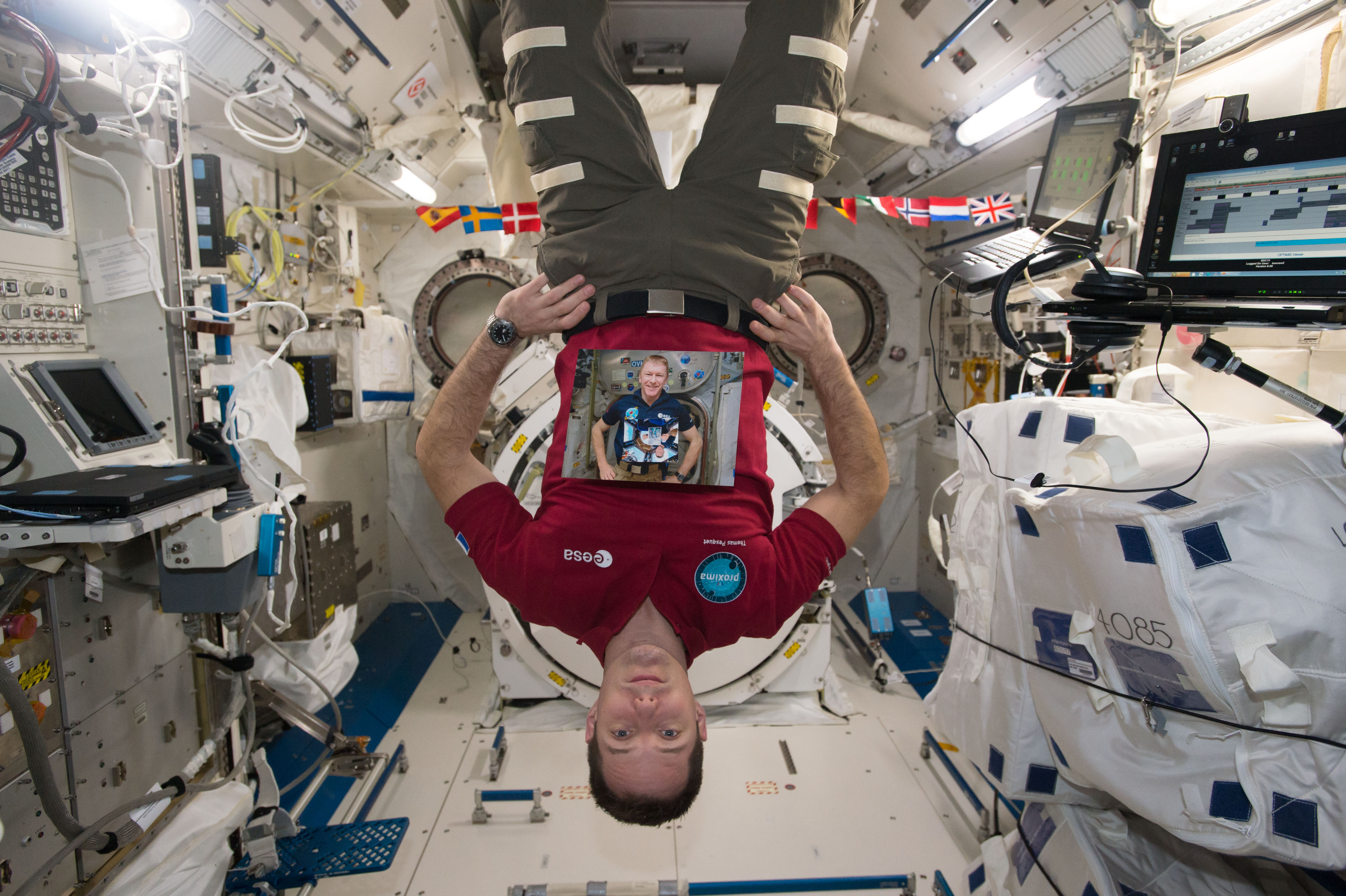
Pesquet holding a photo of ESA colleague Tim Peake holding a photo of fellow ESA astronauts

On March 23, 2017, Pesquet performed his second career EVA with Shane Kimbrough. The main objective was to prepare the Pressurized Mating Adapter-3 (PMA-3) for installation of the second International Docking Adapter (IDA), which will accommodate future commercial crew vehicle dockings. The PMA-3 provides the pressurized interface between the station modules and the docking adapter. Expedition 50 Commander Kimbrough and Pesquet disconnected cables and electrical connections on PMA-3 to prepare for its robotic move on March 26, 2017. PMA-3 will be moved from the port side of the Tranquility module to the space-facing side of the Harmony module, where it will become home for the docking adapter, which will be delivered on a future flight of a SpaceX Dragon cargo ship. The spacewalkers also installed on the starboard zero truss (ITS) a new computer relay box equipped with advanced software for the adapter. The two spacewalkers lubricated the latching end effector on the Canadarm2 robotic arm, inspected a radiator valve suspected of a small ammonia leak and replaced cameras on the Japanese segment of the outpost. Radiators are used to shed excess heat that builds up through normal space station operation. The EVA lasted for 6 hours and 34 minutes.

On June 2, 2017, MS-03 undocked from the ISS, carrying Pesquet and Novitskiy back to Earth, concluding a 196-day mission in space. Peggy Whitson remained on the ISS and returned on Soyuz MS-04. MS-03 touched down just over 3 hours after undocking, concluding Pesquet's first spaceflight. Pesquet has spent 196 days, 17 hours and 49 minutes in space.

==== Expedition 65/66 ====
On 11 March 2020, ESA announced in a blog post that Pesquet would return to the ISS in the second half of 2021 for a second six-month stay, in which he would become the first European astronaut to launch on board an American Commercial Crew Vehicle. And on July 28, 2020, Pesquet was officially assigned to the SpaceX Crew-2 as a mission specialist alongside NASA astronauts Shane Kimbrough commander of the Crew Dragon, Megan McArthur the pilot, and JAXA astronaut Akihiko Hoshide, the other mission specialist. Few hours before the announcement and after a competition to name Pesquet's mission, Pesquet revealed his second mission name as "Alpha", after Alpha Centauri, the nearest star system to the Sun, following the French mission naming tradition.

Crew Dragon Endeavour was launched on 23 April 2021 at 09:49:02 UTC, and docked to the International Space Station on 24 April at 09:08 UTC. Once on board the station, they joined ISS Expedition 65.

During this mission, Pesquet performed 4 EVAs. The first three EVAs were conducted with Shane Kimbrough on the 16, 20, and 25 of June with the tasks to install the first two Roll Out Solar Arrays (iROSA) on the station. The fourth EVA was originally planned to be performed by Akihiko Hoshide and Mark Vande Hei, but due to a medical issue for Vande Hei, Pesquet exited for the sixth time of his career the ISS to perform a spacewalk. During this spacewalk, he became the European record holder for most cumulative hours spent spacewalking, with a total of 39 hours and 54 minutes.

On October 4, 2021, he received the command of the ISS from Akihiko Hoshide, making him the first French astronaut to command a space vehicle. He transferred the command of the station to his Russian colleague Anton Shkaplerov on November 6, 2021.

Crew-2 landed in the Gulf of Mexico on 9 November 2021, after 199 days in space.

==== Vast-PAM-1 ====
Pesquet has been selected as commander of Vast-PAM-1, the sixth private astronaut mission to the ISS, organized by Vast and scheduled for 2027. Fellow ESA astronaut Aleš Svoboda will fly as pilot of the mission. On 6 July 2026, during a meeting in Paris with journalists from the Association of Professional Aeronautics and Space Journalists (AJPAE), he indicated that this mission could feature an all-European crew.

== Recognition and honours ==
Pesquet is a member of the French Aeronautics and Astronautics Association (3AF), and of the American Institute of Aeronautics and Astronautics (AIAA).

On 12 April 2021, Thomas Pesquet was nominated Goodwill Ambassador for the Food and Agriculture Organization of the United Nations.

At the closing ceremony of the 2020 Summer Olympics, during the "handoff" portion introducing Paris as the host of the 2024 Summer Olympics, Pesquet performed the closing bars of the French national anthem La Marseillaise on a saxophone while aboard the International Space Station.

In 2020 he was also selected as a Karman Fellow for his work done in space exploration.

== Other activities ==
Wanting to transmit his passion for space, he wrote an autobiography Ma vie sans gravité ("My life without gravity", gravity and seriousness being the same word in French).

He also portrayed himself in the films Proxima (2019) and Hawa (2022).

== Personal life ==
Pesquet speaks French, English, Spanish, Chinese, German, and Russian.

Pesquet is a black belt in judo, and lists basketball, jogging, swimming and squash as his favourite sports. He is an outdoor and adventure activities enthusiast, and enjoys mountain biking, kite surfing, sailing, skiing and mountaineering. He also has extensive experience with, and holds advanced licenses in, both scuba diving and parachuting. His other interests include travelling, playing the saxophone, and reading. He is a supporter of the French football team, as well as the French rugby team and the Stade Toulousain.

== See also ==
- French space program

Preceded by Akihiko Hoshide	ISS Commander (Expedition 65/66); 4 October to 8 November 2021	Succeeded by Anton Shkaplerov
