= Axiom Mission 5 =

Planned private crewed spaceflight to the International Space Station in 2027

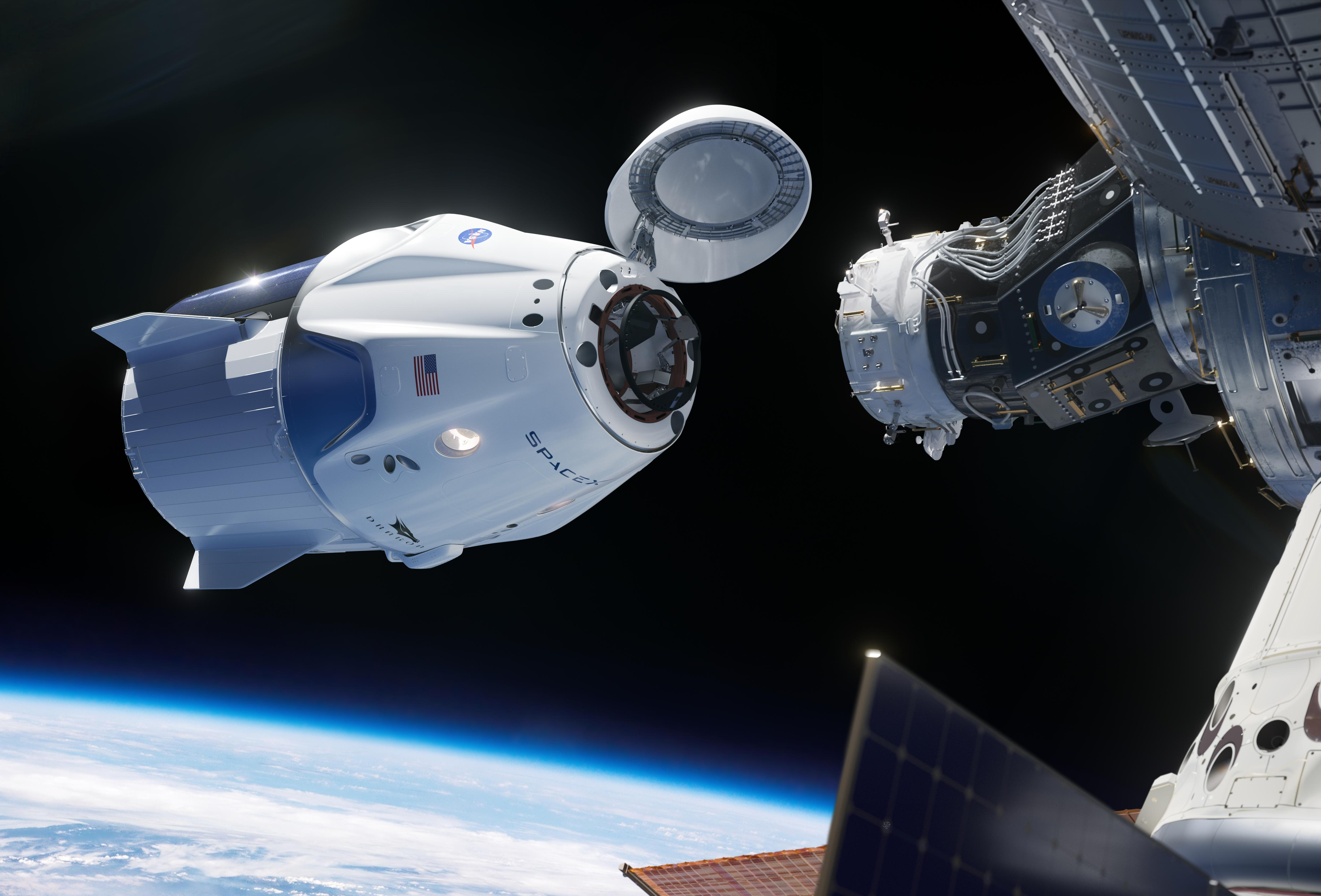
- Artists' impression of a Crew Dragon approaching the forward port of Harmony on the ISS.
- Names: Ax-5
- Mission type: Private spaceflight to the ISS
- Operator: Axiom Space; SpaceX
- Mission duration: 14–21 days (planned)

Spacecraft properties
- Spacecraft: Crew Dragon
- Spacecraft type: Crew Dragon
- Manufacturer: SpaceX

Crew
- Crew size: 4
- Members: TBA; TBA; TBA; TBA

Start of mission
- Launch date: NET January 2027
- Rocket: Falcon 9 Block 5
- Launch site: Cape Canaveral, SLC‑40
- Contractor: SpaceX

End of mission
- Recovered by: MV Shannon (planned)
- Landing site: Pacific Ocean (planned)

Orbital parameters
- Reference system: Geocentric orbit
- Regime: Low Earth orbit

Docking with ISS
- Docking port: Harmony zenith

Axiom Mission 5 (or Ax-5) is an upcoming private spaceflight to the International Space Station operated by Axiom Space using a SpaceX Crew Dragon spacecraft. The mission is planned to launch no earlier than January 2027 and last about two weeks.

== Mission ==
NASA announced on 2 April 2025, they would be seeking bids for two private missions to the ISS. All prior private ISS contracts had been performed by Axiom. (Note: Ax-1, Ax-2, Ax-3, and the then upcoming Ax-4.) Both upcoming missions would spend 14 days at the ISS. On 30 January 2026, NASA announced that Axiom had won one of the two missions for Ax-5, targeted to launch no earlier than January 2027. The other mission, Vast-PAM-1, was awarded to Vast while a third mission, VOYG-1 by Voyager Technologies, was announced on April 16.

Payload integration will be performed by Voyager. Ax-5, as with prior missions, will develop the techniques required for Axiom employed private astronauts to dock with their own private space station, the in-development Axiom Station. The funds from the awarded contract, alongside a restructuring of Axiom's debt, will help Axiom continue to finance their Extravehicular Mobility Unit that they are developing for NASA for use on the Moon during the lunar landing scheduled for Artemis IV.

== Crew ==
The mission will carry a professionally trained commander and three private astronauts. When the mission was announced, Axiom Space said it would submit four different crew proposals to NASA, which would make the final crew selection.

Beginning in 2024, Axiom signed a series of memoranda of understanding with several national governments to fly astronauts on future private missions to the International Space Station. Agreements were announced with the Czech Republic, Portugal, the United Kingdom, and Argentina. The Czech agreement initially identified ESA astronaut Aleš Svoboda as a prospective crew member, but he was later reassigned to Vast's mission after the Czech government reached a separate agreement with them.

At the 77th International Astronautical Congress in October 2026, Axiom's CEO announced that they were seeing high demand from various national programs for flights with a specific demand for longer duration ISS mission.
