= VOYG-1 =

Planned private crewed spaceflight to the International Space Station in 2028

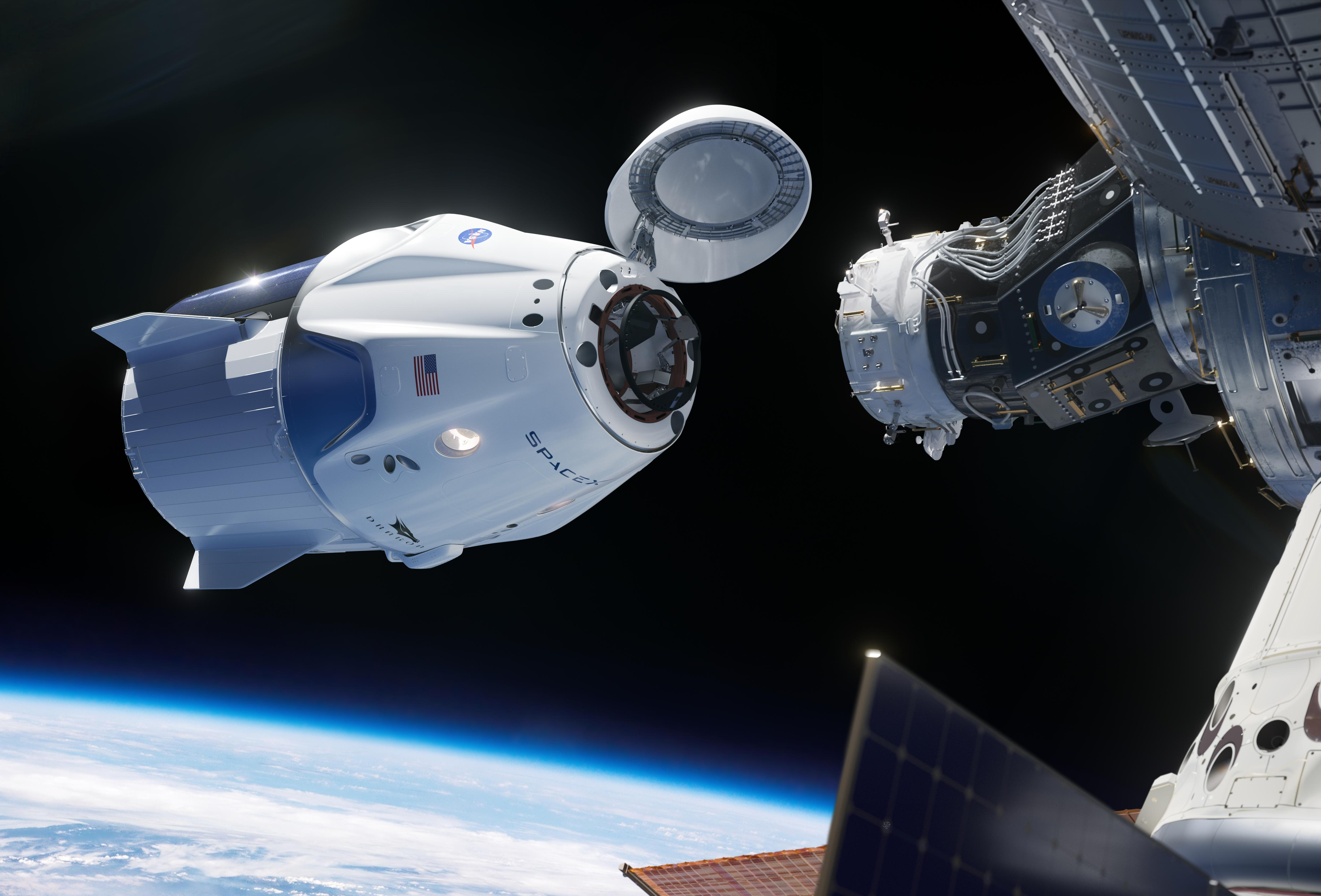
- Artists' impression of a Crew Dragon approaching the forward port of Harmony on the ISS.
- Names: Voyager Mission 1
- Mission type: Private spaceflight to the ISS
- Operator: Voyager Technologies; SpaceX
- Mission duration: up to 14 days (planned)

Spacecraft properties
- Spacecraft type: Crew Dragon
- Manufacturer: SpaceX

Crew
- Crew size: 4
- Members: TBA

Start of mission
- Launch date: NET 2028
- Rocket: Falcon 9 Block 5
- Launch site: Kennedy, LC‑39A or Cape Canaveral, SLC‑40
- Contractor: SpaceX

Orbital parameters
- Reference system: Geocentric orbit
- Regime: Low Earth orbit

Docking with ISS

VOYG-1 is an upcoming private Dragon 2 mission to the International Space Station by Voyager Technologies.

== Background ==
VOYG-1 was announced on 16 April 2026, making it the seventh, and most recent, contracted Private Astronaut Mission from NASA and the first from Voyager. (Note: Prior missions include Axiom Mission 1, Axiom Mission 2, Axiom Mission 3, and Axiom Mission 4 with two others also under contract, Axiom Mission 5, and Vast-1.) Like with the other contracted missions from Axiom Space, and Vast these missions are both to develop procedure and train these companies commercial astronauts, but to also raise cash for their own private space stations, in Voyager's case, Starlab. Funds will also be used to help finance Voyager's development of habitation modules for the planned Artemis Lunar Base.

== Mission ==
VOYG-1 will stay at the International Space Station for up to 14 days. Unlike the prior Axiom missions, which saw one commercial astronaut and 3 seats that where sold off to foreign partners, all 4 of VOYG-1's crew will be Voyager employed commercial astronauts. The mission is expected to launch no earlier than 2028.
