= Aleš Svoboda =

Aleš Svoboda may refer to:

- Aleš Svoboda (linguist) (1941–2010), Czech linguist and university professor
- Aleš Svoboda (astronaut) (born 1986), Czech fighter pilot and astronaut
