= Starfish Space =

American satellite company

Starfish Space is an American satellite company focused on space rendezvous and satellite servicing based in the Seattle metropolitan area. It was founded in 2019 by Austin Link and Dr. Trevor Bennett, both former engineers at Blue Origin. Starfish Space is developing the Otter spacecraft, designed for satellite servicing. The first three Otter vehicles are scheduled for launch in 2026 with missions planned for NASA, U.S. Space Force and Intelsat.

== History ==
=== 2019–2021: Founding and Initial Development ===
Austin Link and Dr. Trevor Bennett, former engineers at Blue Origin, co-founded Starfish Space in October 2019. The company's objective is to develop a small satellite capable of capturing and moving other objects in orbit. In August 2021, Starfish was awarded a Small Business Innovation Research (SBIR) contract by the U.S. Space Force to support the development of autonomous software for satellite proximity operations and docking. The company raised $7 million in seed funding in September 2021, with the investment round led by NFX and MaC Venture Capital.

=== 2022–2026: Otter Pup 1 Mission and First Otter Contracts ===
In May, 2022, Starfish Space won a SBIR contract with NASA for continued development of Starfish's CETACEAN relative navigation software, designed to determine the relative position of spacecraft during proximity operations. In November 2022, the company announced its first demonstration mission, Otter Pup 1, with the goal of docking with another spacecraft in orbit.

In March 2023, the company secured $14 million in a Series A round. The round was led by Munich Re Ventures, with additional participation from Toyota Ventures and Pioneer Square Labs. The funding supports the development of the Otter satellite servicing vehicle.

On June 12, 2023, Starfish launched its first demonstration satellite, Otter Pup 1, as part of the SpaceX Falcon 9 rideshare mission, Transporter-8. Otter Pup 1 was deployed alongside other payloads on an external orbital transfer vehicle (OTV). Shortly after separating from the Falcon 9, the OTV experienced a software anomaly, leading to the emergency deployment of Otter Pup 1. As a result, Otter Pup 1 began spinning at a rate of over 330 degrees per second. Within two months of the emergency deployment, Starfish Space stabilized Otter Pup 1 using control algorithms developed by the company's engineers.

In August 2023, the company was awarded $1.8 million by the U.S. Air Force to support continued development of its guidance, navigation, and control software. In October 2023, the company received a contract with NASA to conduct a study for a potential orbital inspection mission.

On April 19, 2024, Starfish Space's demonstration mission, Otter Pup 1, successfully completed a rendezvous and proximity operation (RPO) mission, capturing an image of a D-Orbit ION spacecraft during a flyby within approximately 1 kilometer.

In May 2024, the company secured a $37.5 million contract with the U.S. Space Force to develop, launch, and operate an Otter satellite servicing vehicle for national space assets in geostationary orbit. In June of 2024, Starfish Space and Intelsat announced a contract to develop, launch and operate an Otter satellite servicing vehicle to extend the operational life of an Intelsat satellite in geostationary orbit. In August 2024, the company was awarded a $15 million contract from NASA to develop, launch, and operate an Otter satellite servicing vehicle for a debris inspection mission involving several NASA satellites in low Earth orbit. In October 2024, Starfish Space was awarded a contract with the NRO to conduct a mission concept study for satellite servicing.

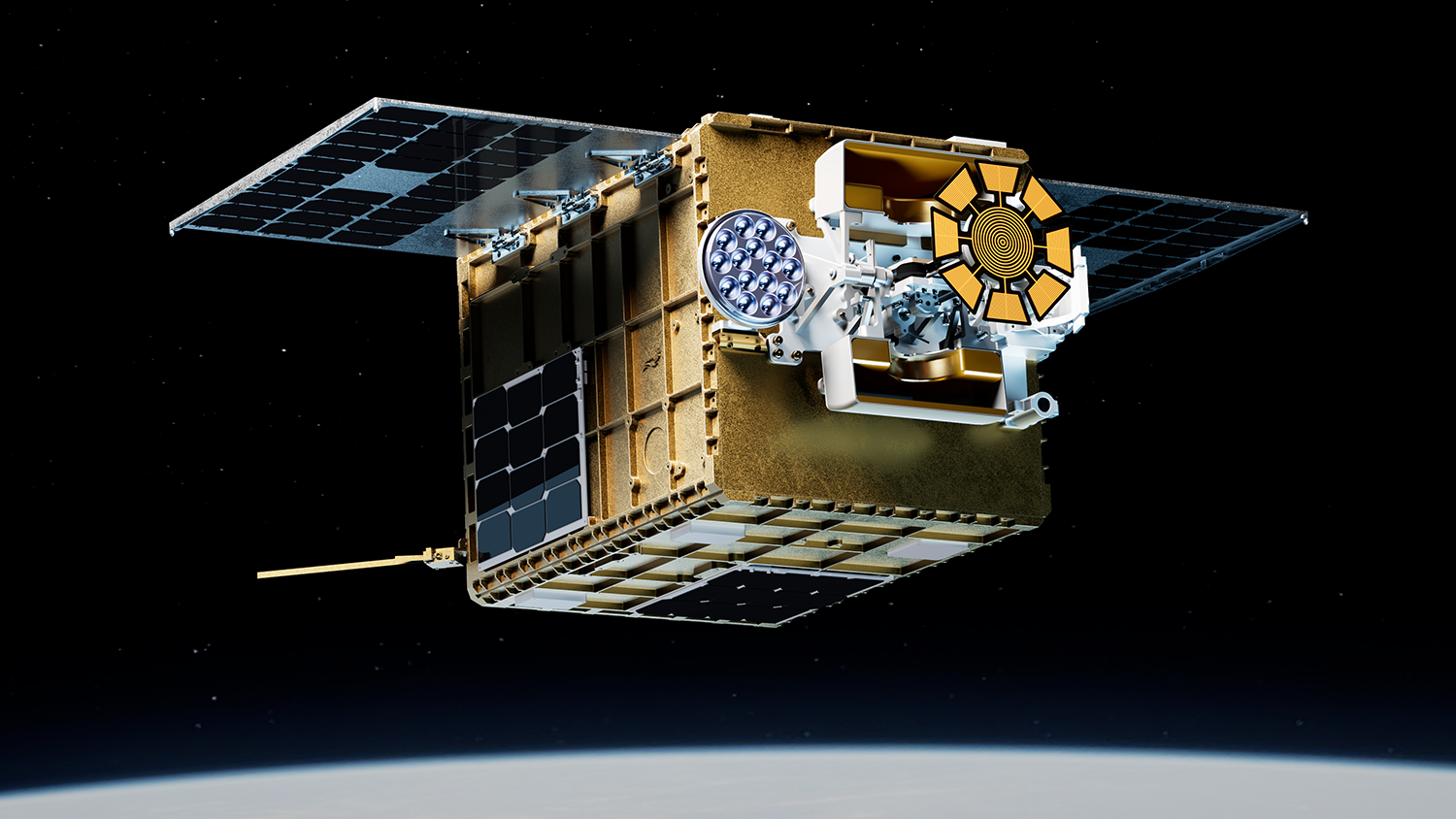
Starfish Space's Otter Pup 2 Mission

In November 2024, the company secured $29 million in additional funding led by Shield Capital, with participation from new investors Point72 Ventures, Booz Allen Ventures, Aero X Ventures, Trousdale Ventures, and TRAC VC, and existing investors Munich Re Ventures, Toyota Ventures, NFX, and Industrious Ventures.

=== 2025–2026: Otter Pup 2 Mission and Remora Mission ===
In May 2025, Starfish Space announced the Otter Pup 2 mission, which aims to perform the first-ever commercial docking with an unprepared satellite in low Earth orbit. Launched on Transporter-14 rideshare mission with SpaceX on June 23, 2025, Otter Pup 2 will rendezvous with and attempt to dock with a D-Orbit ION satellite. The mission builds on experience gained from the earlier Otter Pup 1 demonstration, advancing Starfish Space’s objective of developing scalable satellite servicing capabilities.

In December 2025, Starfish Space, in collaboration with Impulse Space, announced the successful completion of the Remora mission, an autonomous rendezvous and proximity operations (RPO) demonstration conducted in low Earth orbit (LEO). The mission represented an industry first, a fully autonomous rendezvous performed by Starfish using a single lightweight camera system and closed-loop guidance, navigation, and control software operating on a peripheral flight computer.

In January 2026, Starfish Space announced it was awarded a $52.5 million contract by the U.S. Space Force, through its Space Development Agency, to provide end-of-life satellite disposal services for the Proliferated Warfighter Space Architecture in low Earth orbit. The contract marked the first time a customer formally contracted an end-of-life disposal mission for an operational satellite constellation. Under the agreement, Starfish Space will build, launch, and operate an Otter spacecraft designed to deorbit retired satellites, beginning with an initial disposal mission and including options for multiple additional deorbits. The mission is targeting a launch in 2027.

In April 2026, Starfish raised over $100 million in a Series B funding round led by Point72 Ventures. The round was co-led by Activate Capital and Shield Capital, with participation from Industrious Ventures and NightDragon. Existing investors NFX, Munich Re Ventures, Toyota Ventures, and PSL Ventures also participated. New investors included Nomi Capital, Gaingels, and Overlap Holdings.

== Technology ==
Starfish Space is developing the Otter servicing vehicle, which is designed to rendezvous with, dock, and service satellites in orbit. The Otter vehicle utilizes robotics and autonomous guidance, navigation, and control systems to carry out these operations. The technology is intended to increase the operational lifespan of satellites by offering services such as backup disposal for non-functional satellites and extending the lifespans of active satellites.

=== Otter Servicing Vehicle ===
The Otter servicing vehicle is equipped with proprietary software and hardware technology developed by Starfish Space, allowing it to autonomously perform rendezvous, inspect, docking, and relocation of objects in orbit.

==== Software ====
CETACEAN: A relative navigation system that uses computer vision and navigation filtering techniques to determine Otter's position relative to a client satellite or other object in space.

CEPHALOPOD: Guidance and control (GNC) software designed to autonomously plan and execute orbital trajectories, enabling Otter to dock safely with a client satellite.

==== Hardware ====
Nautilus: A universal docking mechanism that allows Otter to dock with various unprepared surfaces commonly found on satellites.

Manta: An articulating boom that Otter uses for precision thrusting while docked with a client satellite.

== Services ==
Starfish Space provides a range of in-orbit services, including:

Satellite Life Extension: Otter vehicles can extend the operational life of satellites by docking with them and using Otter's propulsion systems to maintain the satellite's position in its orbital slot.

Satellite Disposal: Otter vehicles are capable of capturing and deorbiting defunct satellites and debris, reducing the risk they pose to active satellites. This service allows customers to extend satellite operations with the assurance that Otter can provide end-of-life disposal support.
