= Vast-1 =

Planned private crewed spaceflight to Haven-1

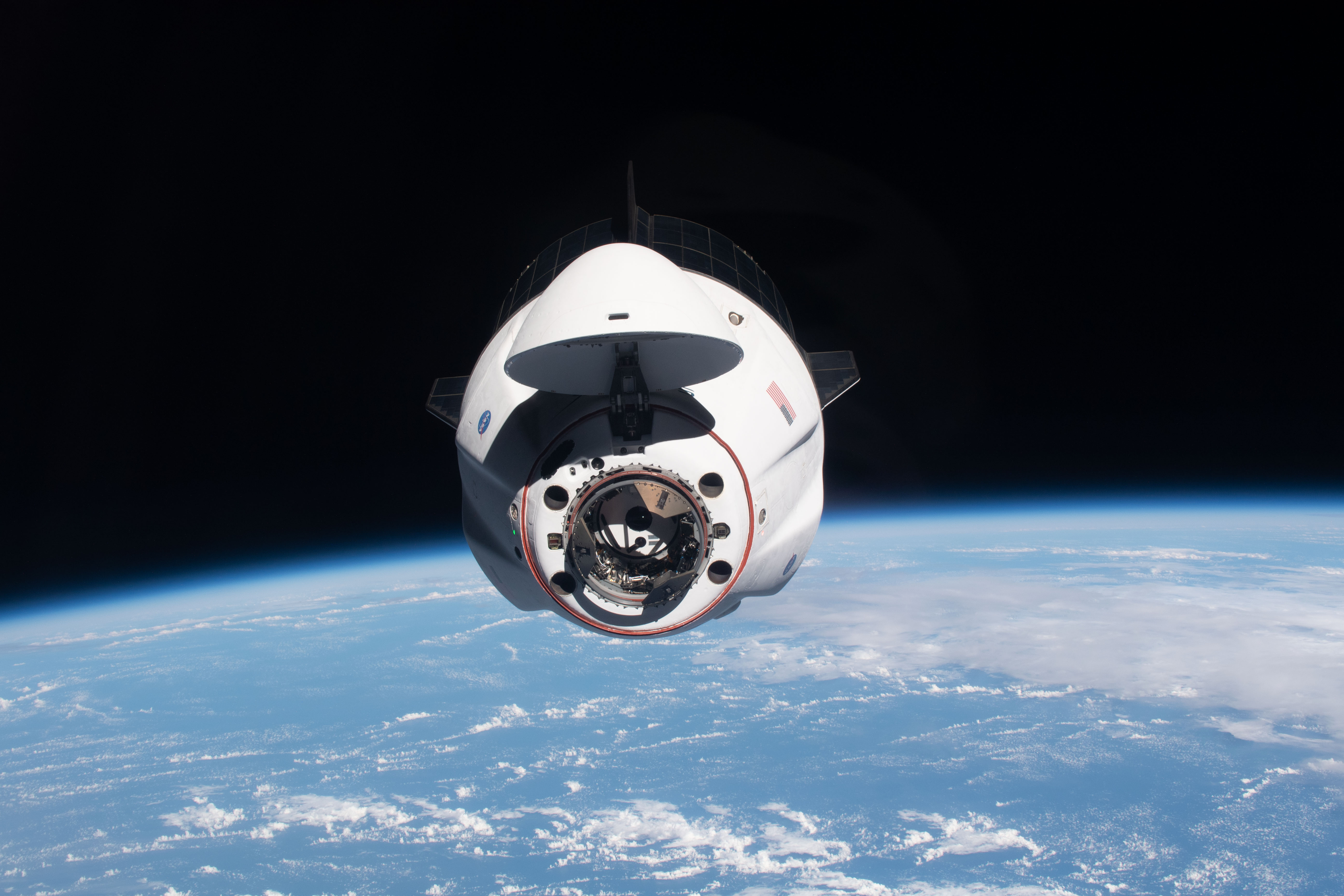
- The Crew Dragon Endeavour in Earth orbit
- Mission type: Private spaceflight
- Operator: Vast and SpaceX
- Mission duration: 30 days

Spacecraft properties
- Spacecraft: Dragon 2

Expedition
- Space station: Haven-1

Crew
- Crew size: 4
- Members: TBA; TBA; Arnaud Prost; TBA

Start of mission
- Launch date: NET 2027 (planned)
- Rocket: Falcon 9 Block 5
- Launch site: Kennedy Space Center
- Contractor: SpaceX

Orbital parameters
- Regime: Low Earth orbit

Docking with Haven-1

Vast-1 is a planned private spaceflight to the Haven-1 space station, that is planned to launch no earlier than Q1 2027 by American aerospace company Vast. Vast-1 is expected to launch on a Falcon 9 rocket, using a Crew Dragon vehicle, both manufactured by SpaceX. The stay on the station is planned to last no more than 30 days. The spaceflight will include four astronauts who will be trained by SpaceX on their Crew Dragon capsule through simulations and formations.

== Crew ==
Seats on the mission are being sold to space agencies and private individuals who are involved in science and philanthropic projects at an unknown price. Arnaud Prost will serve as a flight test engineer for this mission. John McFall could join him on the mission as well as the UK's government signed a memorandum of understanding for McFall to join the mission, should the UK Space Agency decide to fund it.

Position	Astronaut
Commander	TBA
Pilot	TBA
Flight Test-Engineer	Arnaud Prost, ESA; First spaceflight
Mission Specialist	TBA

== Mission ==
During the mission, the crew will conduct various experiments, relating to both science and in-space manufacturing. As of June 2023, these experiments are unknown, however, they may be both internal and external.

At some point during the mission, the Haven-1 space station's propulsion system will cause the station to rotate, providing artificial gravity, similar to the gravity one would experience on the Moon. If successful, it would be the second time artificial gravity has been deliberately produced in a crewed spacecraft, with the first being on NASA's Gemini 11 in 1966.

== Future flights ==
Vast's contract with SpaceX includes the option for a second crewed mission to Haven-1 with a launch scheduled for no earlier than 2027 called Vast-2.

== See also ==
- Vast-PAM-1
