= Adrianos Golemis =

Greek physician and European Space Agency (ESA) flight surgeon

Adrianos Golemis is a Greek physician and European Space Agency (ESA) flight surgeon who, in 2022, became the first Greek citizen to be selected for ESA's astronaut training programme. He serves as Lead Flight Surgeon at the European Astronaut Centre in Cologne, Germany, and is expected to fly to the International Space Station as part of a 2027 mission, which would make him the first Greek astronaut.

== Early life and education ==
Golemis studied medicine at the Aristotle University of Thessaloniki and later earned a master's degree in space studies from the International Space University in Strasbourg, France.

== Career ==
Golemis worked as a research physician in Antarctica, studying the effects of isolation and extreme conditions on human physiology and psychology. He later worked for MEDES, the French Institute of Space Medicine and Physiology. Since 2018, he has supported ESA astronauts medically, and now holds the position of Lead Flight Surgeon.

In 2022, Golemis took part in ESA's astronaut selection process, scoring in the top 0.1% among more than 22,000 applicants. In 2026, he began astronaut training at the European Astronaut Centre, becoming the first Greek citizen to do so.

== Spaceflight ==
In 2026, the European Space Agency signed an agreement on behalf of Greece with the American company Vast for Golemis to fly to the International Space Station in 2027, subject to approval by station partners.

== Personal life ==
Golemis holds a private pilot's license and is a diver and amateur astrophotographer. He is an elected member of the International Academy of Astronautics and The Explorers Club.
