= Impulse Space =

American space company

- Type: Private
- Industry: Space
- Founded: 2021
- Founder: Tom Mueller
- Headquarters: Redondo Beach, California, United States
- Website: www.impulsespace.com

Impulse Space is an American startup founded in 2021 developing in-space transportation technology and services for satellites that fly to Low Earth Orbit but then need to reach other orbits.

The company was founded by Tom Mueller, employee No.1 at SpaceX and principal engineer of the Merlin and Draco rocket engines that power the Falcon 9 and Dragon spacecraft.

== Orbital Transfer Vehicles ==
Impulse Space designs and manufactures orbital transfer vehicles, to move satellites and payloads throughout space. As of 2026, they have been added to the list of National Security Launch Program providers for the United States Space Force.

=== Mira ===
The size of a dishwasher, a Mira orbital transfer vehicle weighs approximately 300 kg (660 lb) when loaded with propellant. It uses Saiph bipropellant thrusters which have a specific impulse (I_{sp}) of 290 s. It can impart a delta-v of from 500 m/s with 300 kg payload to 900 m/s with 100 kg payload.

In November 2023 the first Mira flight was launched as part the SpaceX Transporter-9 mission. A second Mira spacecraft was launched as party of the Transporter-12 mission on 15 January 2025.

Orbit Fab, in a mission funded by the Defense Innovation Unit (DIU), has contracted Impulse on a GEO in-space refueling mission using Mira.

=== Helios ===
On January 17, 2024, Impulse announced their new high-energy kick stage, Helios. It is intended to propel up to 4 tons launched on a Falcon 9 and 5 tons on Relativity's Terran R vehicle from LEO directly into geostationary orbit. With a diameter of just under 3.5 meters, Helios is sized to fit within a Falcon 9 fairing. A Deneb engine providing 67 kN (15,000 lb_{f}) of thrust will burn up to 14,000 kg (31,000 lb) of liquid oxygen and liquid methane propellant. On September 16, 2024, Impulse indicated the first flight of Helios was scheduled for 2026. In May 2025, Impulse signed a multi-launch agreement with communications satellite operator, SES to use Helios to lift four-ton SES satellites launched to LEO into geostationary orbit, with the first mission in 2027.

=== Mars Lander ===
In July 2022, Impulse Space announced a joint mission with Relativity Space to land on Mars. Impulse is responsible for building the lander itself, the cruise stage and the entry capsule. Relativity would launch the spacecraft on its Terran R, which is currently under development. The mission has since moved to a 2026 launch date.

== Rocket engines ==
Since the founding of Impulse in 2021, the company has developed several rocket engines — Saiph, Rigel, and Deneb — for use in spacecraft.

=== Saiph ===
On May 10, 2023, an Impulse Space press release announced the successful qualification of their 5 lbf (22 N) Saiph thruster. Using the propellants of nitrous oxide and ethane, the thruster achieved a burn duration of 12 continuous minutes and 50,000 pulses over the 17 day qualification period. Saiph thruster uses spark ignition.

The company incorporated eight Saiph thrusters into their Mira spacecraft, which launched to space September 2023 on the SpaceX Transporter-9 mission. The company announced their successful firings of all eight thrusters in a November 2023 mission update.

Vast, a privately funded commercial space station company, procured Impulse's Saiph thrusters and propulsion hardware for its Haven-1 mission. In May 2023, Vast unveiled its Haven-1 station and announced that SpaceX would launch the spacecraft and provide taxi services to the future habitat.

=== Rigel ===
Rigel was the company's first rocket engine, designed for use on Impulse's Mars Lander vehicle. The engine has undergone extensive testing from the company's Mojave Air and Space Port facilities.

=== Deneb ===
Deneb is a 15,000 lbf (67 kN) staged combustion cycle engine that uses liquid oxygen (LOX) and methane as propellants. It is being developed as the main engine of Impulse's Helios vehicle and would burn 14,000 kg of propellant across each mission.

== Corporate affairs ==
=== Investors ===
Impulse Space investors include Founders Fund, Lux Capital, Airbus Ventures, Space Capital, RTX Ventures and Venture Capitalist Dovi Frances.

=== Board of Directors ===
Joined board	Name	Background
2021	Tom Mueller	Impulse CEO and Founder.
2024	General John W. Raymond	Chief of Space Operations for the United States Space Force from 2019 to 2022

== Facilities ==
Impulse Space operates from three American locations. Its corporate headquarters operate from a 60,000-square-foot facility in Redondo Beach, California. In February 2023, the company opened an office in Boulder, Colorado. Rocket engine tests are conducted at the Mojave Air and Space Port.
