= SEATEST II =

Coordinates: 24°57′00″N 80°27′13″W

- Mission duration: 5 days
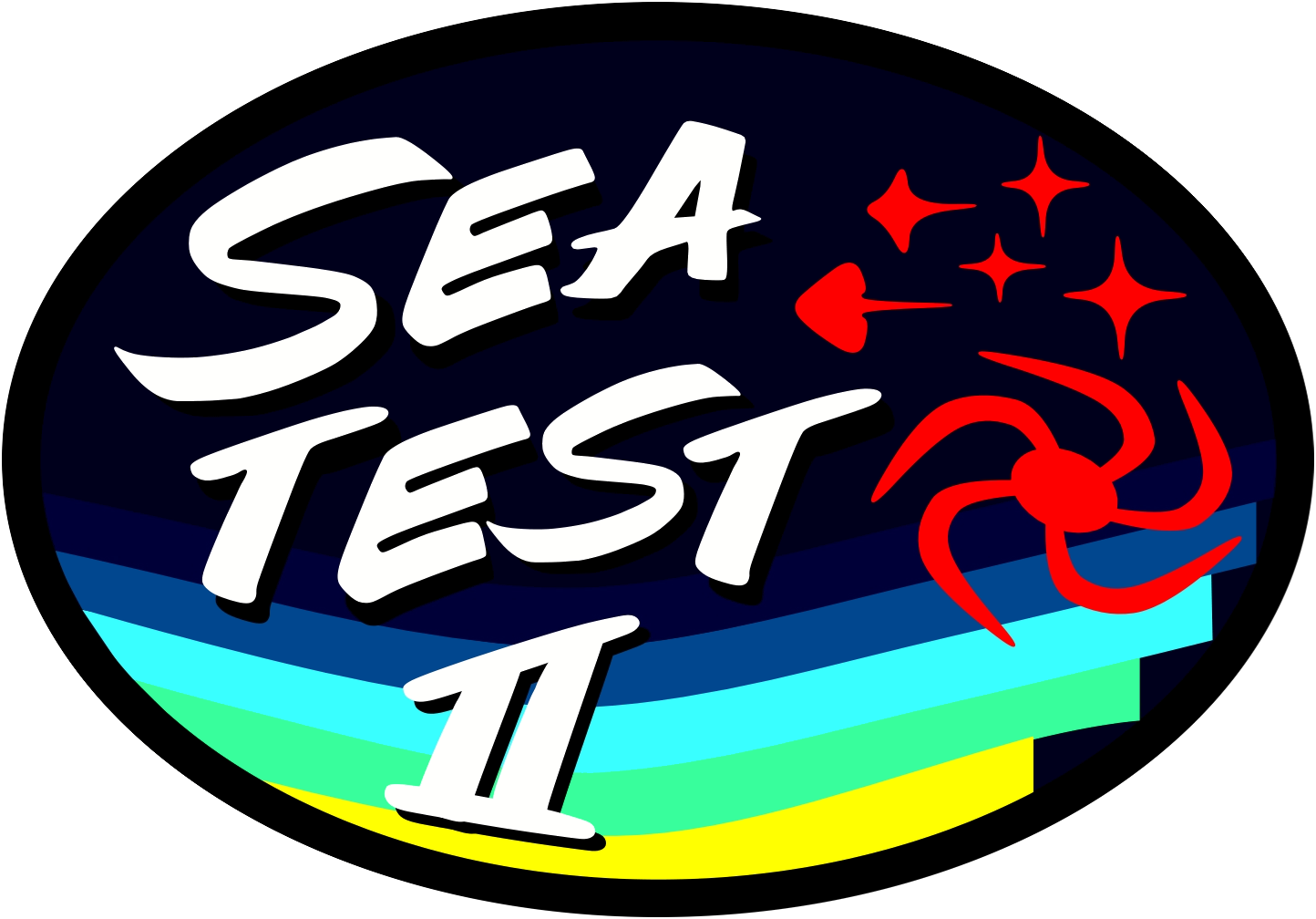
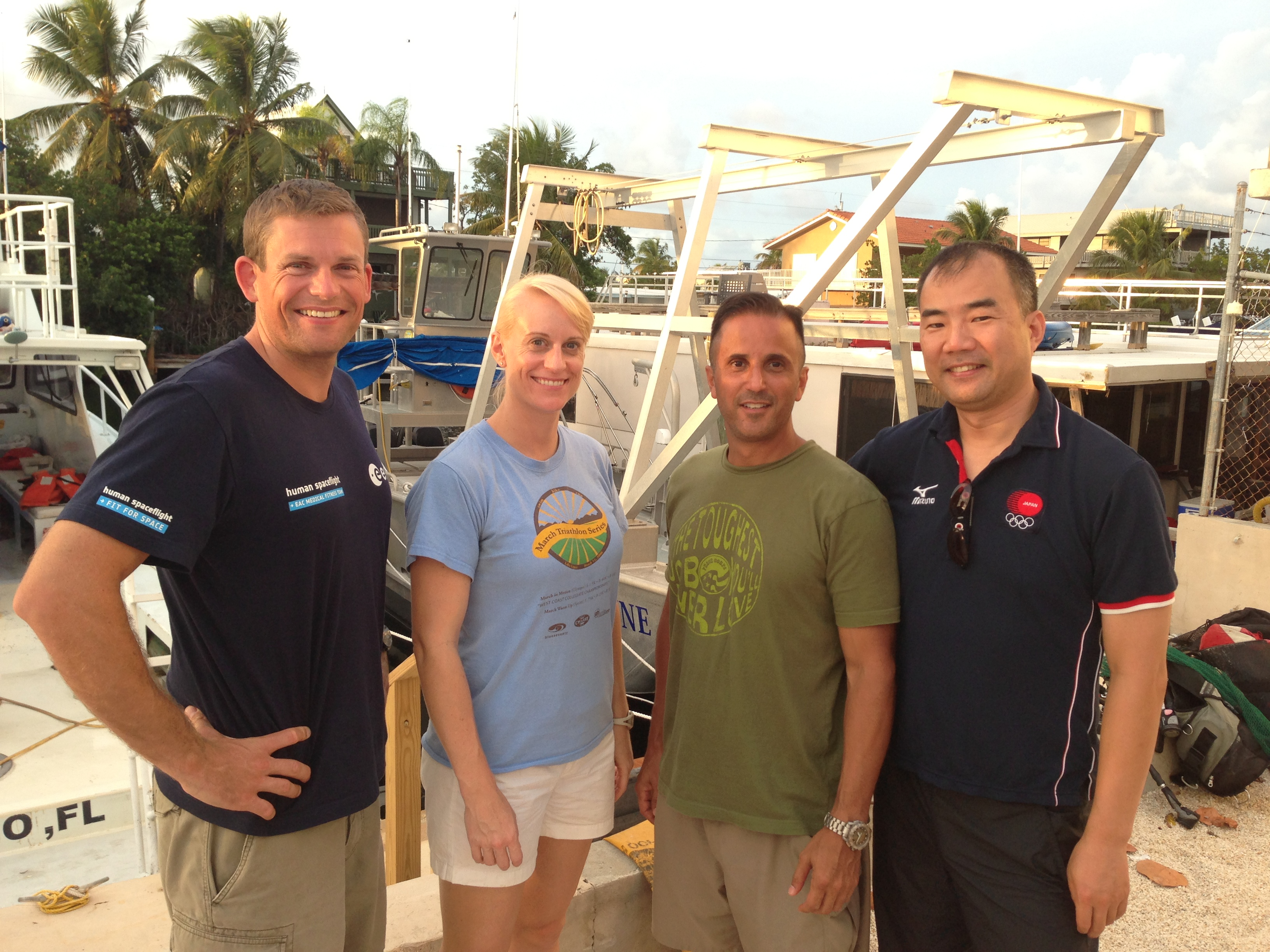
- Left to right: A. Mogensen, K. Rubins, J. Acaba and S. Noguchi

SEATEST II, an acronym for Space Environment Analog for Testing EVA Systems and Training (number two), is a NASA underwater mission, formerly known as NEEMO XVII, in the Aquarius underwater laboratory in preparation for future space exploration. The objectives for this exercise are largely focused on the evolution of EVA (extravehicular activity) tools, and maturing some technologies that could have implications for the ISS and future exploration missions (MED and JITT delivery.)

However, the SEATEST II mission will be very short, focused on engineering evaluations, and will not have time for the educational and public outreach that has been typical of NEEMO missions. The different name is a way of indicating a mission with somewhat different expectations than NEEMO missions have come to be known for. Before NEEMO 1, a short saturation mission was conducted to evaluate the Aquarius facility and capabilities. This mission was called SEATEST 1.

== Crew ==
Position	Astronaut
Commander	Joe Acaba (United States)
Aquanaut	Soichi Noguchi (Japan)
Aquanaut	Kate Rubins (United States)
Aquanaut	Andreas Mogensen (Denmark)

At the time of the mission, Acaba and Noguchi were experienced astronauts with two spaceflights each, whereas Rubins and Mogensen were selected in 2009 and had not flown to space yet. All four crewmembers are qualified on the NASA EMU spacesuit, with Acaba and Noguchi having had on-orbit EVA experience before this mission. Mogensen and Noguchi are additionally qualified on the Russian Orlan EVA spacesuit.
