= Aleš Svoboda (astronaut) =

ESA astronaut

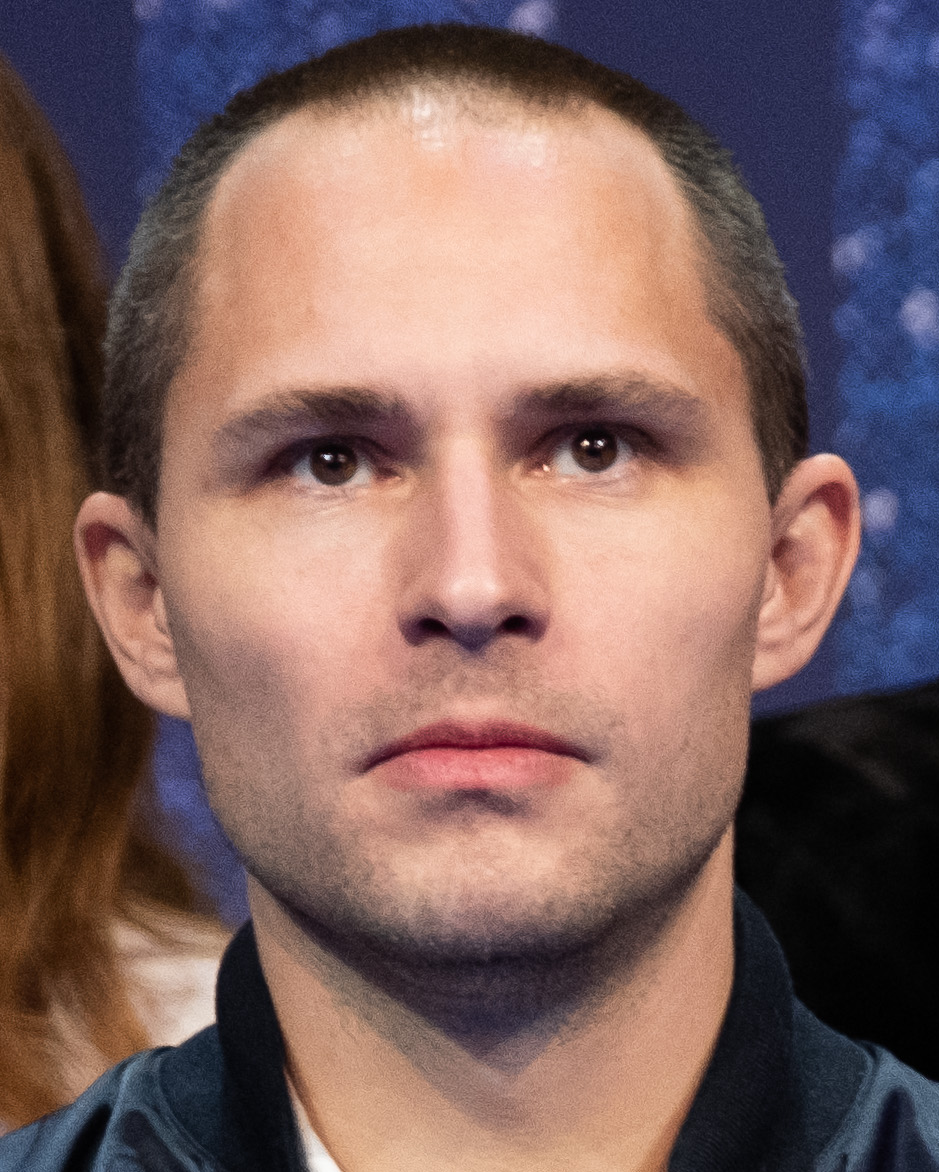
- Svoboda in 2022
- Born: 1986 (age 39–40); Brno, Czechoslovakia
- Occupation: Military pilot
- Space career
- Selection: 2022 ESA Group
- Missions: Vast-PAM-1

Aleš Svoboda (born 1986) is a Czech fighter pilot and astronaut. He holds the rank of major in the Czech Army and serves at the 21st base of the tactical air force in Čáslav. In November 2022, he succeeded in the selection procedure of the European Space Agency and became a member of the reserve team of astronauts, thus he is the first astronaut of the independent Czech Republic.

== Biography ==
Svoboda was born in Brno. In 2005, Svoboda began basic training in the army. Three years later, he became a pilot of the Czech Air Force. In 2011, he won 1st place in aerobatic gliding. Since 2016, he has been flying the JAS-39 Gripen. He has flown over 1300 hours on Gripens and older L-159s.

He has a doctorate in aeronautical and missile engineering from the University of Defense. He studied traffic engineering at the University of Pardubice. He gained experience in the USA, Sweden and the Baltics, where he was deployed to protect the airspace. He served as an operational pilot and commander of NATO's Quick Reaction Alert. He won several awards for his tenure in this capacity.

=== Astronaut career ===
In the spring of 2021, he applied for the European Space Agency (ESA) tender. He was selected for the reserve team of astronauts. He thus managed to succeed among more than 22,500 applicants, of which about 200 were Czech. "It was always a childhood dream for me. As a child I went to the planetarium in Brno, I was always interested in space, aviation and astronautics," said Svoboda.

In the summer of 2023, the private company Axiom Space approached several European countries that had backup astronauts in ESA. Aleš Svoboda thus got the opportunity to fly to the ISS in the Crew Dragon ship as part of the two-week private Axiom Mission 3. The condition was the co-financing of the mission with roughly one billion crowns. According to Svoboda, the investment would pay off, under the condition of co-financing by the private sector. The Minister of Defense Jana Černochová and the Minister of Transport Martin Kupka also wanted to support the mission.

The Czech Republic was given time until the end of 2023 to respond, and at the beginning of December it refused to participate in the mission due to a lack of funds. However, in mid-2024, Kupka said that the Czech Republic is already looking more favorably on the repeated offer and will indeed have a second astronaut. Perhaps as early as 2025, and with the fact that about 1.5 billion crowns of costs will be partly financed by Czech companies from the aviation and arms industry, including those that want to conduct research or experiments on the International Space Station.

On 20 June 2024, at the launch of the Czech Journey to Space program, managed by the Czech Space Team, Minister Kupka confirmed that the Czech Republic will strive for a space flight by a Czech astronaut within the next five years. Kupka and the coordinator of the national space program Václav Kobera added that in the second half of 2024, Svoboda will undergo a two-month training at the European Astronaut Centre, which will be followed later by other stages of preparation. The Czech journey to space program is focused on the development and fulfillment of the potential of the Czech Republic in space research and industry. The government has already received proposals for 60 scientific experiments for the program, including from biomedicine, technical fields and psychology, which could be carried out during the Czech astronaut's mission to the ISS.

In June 2026, he was selected as pilot of the Vast-PAM-1 mission, commanded by another ESA astronaut, Thomas Pesquet.

=== Hobbies ===
Aleš Svoboda likes to play hockey and badminton, and he is also involved in orienteering and diving.
