= Vimeo Livestream =

Live streaming platform of Vimeo

- Company type: Subsidiary
- Available in: English
- Founded: New York City, U.S.
- Headquarters: 555 West 18th Street, New York City, {{{location_country}}}
- Area served: Worldwide
- Owner: Vimeo
- Founders: Max Haot; Dayananda Nanjundappa; Phil Worthington; Mark Kornfilt
- Key people: Mark Kornfilt (CTO/CPO)
- Employees: > 100
- Parent: Vimeo
- Website: Livestream.com
- Commercial: Yes
- Registration: Required to broadcast, optional to view
- Launched: 2007; 19 years ago (as Mogulus)
- Current status: Active
- Native clients on: iOS, Android, Roku, tvOS

Vimeo Livestream is a video live streaming platform based in New York City that allows customers to broadcast live video content using a camera and a computer through the Internet, and viewers to play the content via the web, iOS, Android, Roku, and the Apple TV. Livestream requires a paid subscription for content providers to use; it formerly offered a free ad-supported service but no longer does so as of 2016.

== History ==
Livestream was founded as Mogulus in 2007 by Max Haot, Dayananda Nanjundappa, Phil Worthington, and Mark Kornfilt, and has offices in New York, Los Angeles, London, Zaporizhia and Bangalore. It launched with a free streaming service, and introduced its white label “pro” service in April 2008 with Gannett as its first customer. In July 2008, Gannett invested in Mogulus with $10 million in funding. Mogulus helped C-SPAN to coordinate its online streaming and broadcast of the inauguration of U.S. President Barack Obama in January 2009.

In May 2009, Mogulus re-branded as Livestream. Haot stated that as they started gaining more professional customers, the name "Mogulus" felt like it was impeding the company, and opted to rebrand the company, spending around $100,000 to acquire the "livestream.com" domain name via auction. On October 30, 2009, the Foo Fighters played their first internet-only live concert from their studio space Studio 606 in Los Angeles using Livestream. During the 2 hour and 45 minute performance, viewers were able to ask the band questions, and request songs through a custom Facebook page with an integrated chat feature. The event drew more than 150,000 viewers worldwide .

In May 2014, the company moved its headquarters from Chelsea to Brooklyn, New York. Jesse Hertzberg was appointed CEO in April 2015, with all four founders remaining with the company in senior roles. In 2017, Livestream appointed cofounder Mark Kornfilt as the new CEO.

On September 26, 2017, Livestream was acquired by IAC via subsidiary Vimeo. Vimeo incorporated Livestream into their service Vimeo Live, with plans for professional and enterprise customers. At the time Vimeo acquired Livestream, then CEO of Livestream Mark Kornflit took the position of General Manager of Live and reported to Vimeo CEO Anjali Sud.

In July 2020, the National Academy of Television Arts & Sciences used Livestream via Vimeo OTT to broadcast the Daytime Emmy awards. The Grand Rapids Symphony used the same platform when it began live streaming events in September 2020 as part of its response to the COVID-19 pandemic.

As of February 2021, the New York Stock Exchange and Nasdaq were using Vimeo to live stream their opening and closing bells. Additionally, Stellantis and Allianz Partners have been open about their use of Vimeo live streaming services in their business communications and marketing, respectively.

== Products ==
In 2007, Mogulus introduced 'Studio', an online interface that simulated a tv studio. Users could mix camera feeds, video, YouTube, tickers, overlays to create a "netcast". A Mac/PC desktop client 'Procaster' could be used to combine a camera feed with screen capture. Procaster was later renamed Livestream Producer.

On October 29, 2011, Livestream introduced a new online platform. This dispensed with the channel approach of Studio in favor of an event based one. Multiple video posts, images, or text items could be added to an event. The platform also included an adaptive bitrate player.

With its acquisition of Livestream.com, Vimeo provides live streaming services to individuals and brands as well as to enterprise customers.
