= Bletterbach =

Coordinates: 46°21′28″N 11°26′03″E

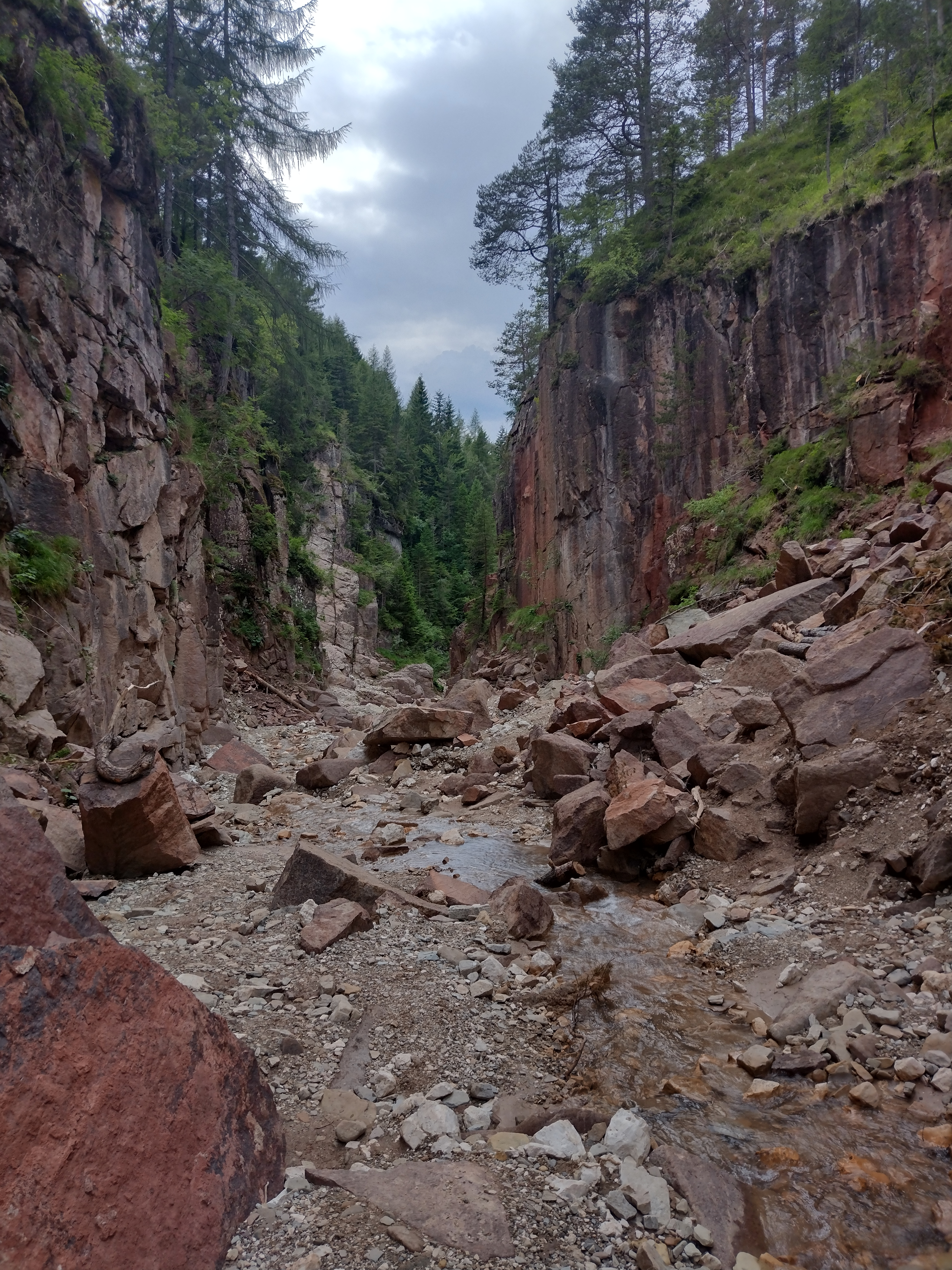
- Bletterbach canyon

Location
- Country: Italy

Physical characteristics
- Source
  - location: At foot of Weißhorn (South Tyrol)
- Length: 8 km (5.0 mi)

The Bletterbach (Italian: Rio delle Foglie, literally "stream of the leaves") is a stream in South Tyrol, Italy.

The Bletterbach is cutting through deposits of the Lower Permian to the Upper Anis, namely the Bolzano Quartz Porphyry (~272 Ma), the Val Gardena Sandstone, which is famous for its fossil footprints, the Bellerophon Formation, the Werfen Formation and the Contrin Formation (or Sarldolomite) of which the top of the Weißhorn consists.

The rocks in the Bellerophon Formation contain evaporites and show transgression. The stratigraphically lower sediments have evidence of terrigenous influence, while the upper sediments were mainly formed in a marine environment.
