= Vast (company) =

American private space company

Vast Space
- Vast Space's wordmark as of October 2024
- Type: Privately held company
- Industry: Space; Artificial gravity
- Founded: 2021 in El Segundo, California, U.S.
- Founder: Jed McCaleb
- Headquarters: Long Beach, California, United States
- Key people: Max Haot (CEO); Alex Hudson (CTO); Jed McCaleb (Chairman)
- Owner: Jed McCaleb
- Number of employees: 606+ (October 2024)
- Subsidiaries: Launcher
- Website: vastspace.com

Vast (also styled Vast Space) is a privately held American aerospace company headquartered in Long Beach, California. It was founded in 2021 by entrepreneur Jed McCaleb with the goal of developing artificial gravity space stations to "expand humanity beyond the solar system".

== History ==
=== Founding ===
Vast Space's logo as of May 2023

Founded in 2021, Vast "officially" launched in September 2022 with the mission to develop the world's first artificial-gravity space stations. Vast later announced in January 2023 that it planned to relocate its corporate headquarters from El Segundo, California to a newly built 115,000 square-foot facility in Long Beach. The new facility, located in the city's Globemaster Corridor Specific Plan, also planned to house the company's manufacturing operations.

Shortly thereafter, in February 2023, Vast announced its acquisition of Hawthorne-based space startup Launcher, with founder & CEO Max Haot becoming president of Vast. As a result of the acquisition, Vast gained its assets, products, and employees. Its 2023 acquisition of Launcher tripled its workforce. Additionally, former Launcher operations such as the development of its E-2 engine and Orbiter payload host would be undertaken by Vast, with plans to start deploying them in the summer of 2023.

In May 2023, Vast announced that it had teamed up with SpaceX to launch its first single-module space station called Haven-1 aboard a Falcon 9 rocket no earlier than August 2025. Plans were also unveiled for a crewed flight up to Haven-1, called Vast-1, to be launched shortly after placing the station in orbit. As of 2023, Vast had aspirations to sell 4 seats aboard the spacecraft, after which the crew would receive training by SpaceX in preparation for the mission.

=== Personnel changes, Haven-1 development ===
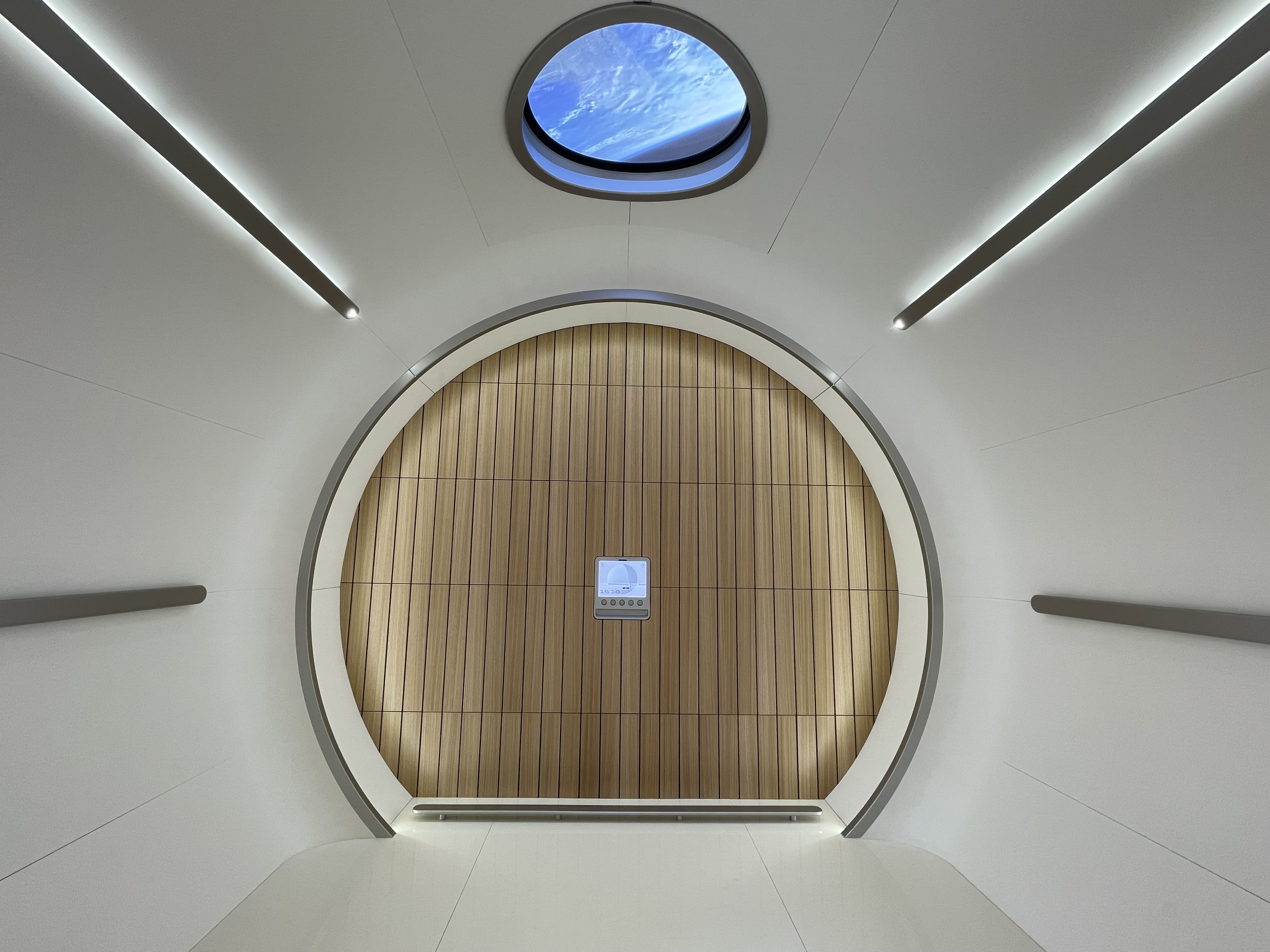
Haven-1 interior mockup

In June 2023, Vast commenced its SN3 mission by launching its Orbiter aboard SpaceX's Falcon 9 rocket on their Transporter-8 mission. The Orbiter was attached to Starfish Space's Otter Pup and would go on to separate from it in the following months. However, on June 21, Haot stated that the Orbiter was "improperly" spinning at 60 rpm. As a result, they elected to immediately deploy all the small sat payloads on board and then stated that Otter Pup's primary mission could not be accomplished. The failure of the SN3 caused the delay of the Orbiter SN5 mission from fall 2023 to February 2024.

Shortly after the commencement of the SN3 mission, Vast received a Collaborations for Commercial Space Capabilities-2 agreement from NASA to help develop artificial gravity stations. Although the agreement did not provide Vast with government funds, it provided technical expertise, assessments, data, and more. Shortly thereafter, Vast announced that it had selected Impulse Space to develop Haven-1's propulsion system.

On July 11, 2023, Vast announced that it had hired former NASA astronaut Garrett Reisman to advise the company on its commercial space station efforts. A few weeks later, Vast announced that Jeb McCaleb would step down from his role as Chief Executive Officer (CEO), and that Max Haot would succeed him as CEO. Vast also announced that it had hired Alex Hudson to be its first Chief Technical Officer (CTO). In December, Vast hired Andrew J. Feustel, another former NASA astronaut, as its second human spaceflight adviser.

In mid-February 2024, Vast announced that it was partnering with El Segundo-based company AnySignal, Irvine-based company TRL11, and Singaporean company Addvalue to provide radio frequency and Inter-satellite Data Relay System (IDRS) connectivity, as well as advanced onboard video solutions for use in Haven-1. They announced a few days later that were seeking to bid for future International Space Station (ISS) private astronaut missions, providing competition to Axiom Space, who dominates in that aspect.

In early April 2024, a contract to use SpaceX's Starlink laser links as part of Haven-1's mission communications system was signed as the company announced it would commence the initial space capable module construction. This came following the completion of a successful pathfinder build. Plans for Haven-2, Haven-1's successor, were released to the public in October and branded as a multi-module station based on upgraded Haven-1 modules. Planned to first launch in 2028 and complete in 2032, Vast indicated that they would enter the station into NASA's Commercial LEO Destinations program in the hopes of securing a contract.

=== Recent ===
The goal of Haven-2 was to allow astronauts to remain in space after the 2030 decommissioning of the ISS.

In May 2025, Haot disclosed that Vast was considering outsourcing Haven-1 crew and cargo ferrying to Indian launchers and capsules.

In April 2025, Vast signed an agreement to collaborate with the Center for the Advancement of Science in Space (CASIS).

It was also continuing to develop its Haven-1 station to compete in the NASA competition Commercial Low Earth Orbit (LEO) Destinations (CLD) program, which is scheduled to pick one or two replacements for the ISS in July 2026.

After undergoing pressure testing in summer 2025, Haven-1 was undergoing assembly as of January 2026. On January 10, Vast completed the primary structure.

On March 5, 2026, Vast announced US$500 million of new investment, consisting of $300 million of equity and $200 million of debt. Investors included Balerion Space Ventures, IQT, Qatar Investment Authority, Mitsui & Co., MUFG, Nikon Corporation, Stellar Ventures, Space Capital, Earthrise Ventures, and Jed McCaleb, Vast's founder.

In April 2026, Vast announced a strategic partnership, focused on biomedical research in space and crew health, with the Center for Space Medicine Research at Cedars-Sinai Medical Center.

== Spaceflights ==
=== ISS mission ===
On February 12, 2026, it was announced that Vast won the sixth commercial contract to take astronauts to the ISS, with the five prior contracts all having been awarded to Axiom Space. Like the prior Axiom missions, the Vast mission will use a SpaceX Dragon 2 to take passengers to the ISS for 14 days and is tentatively slated for launch in late 2027. ESA astronaut Thomas Pesquet has been selected as commander of this mission.

== Hardware ==
=== Rocket engines ===
Following the acquisition of Launcher, the development of its E-2 rocket engine was continued within Vast. The E-2 engine is a 3D printed staged combustion liquid propellant rocket engine. Originally meant to be used for Launcher's Light launch vehicle, the E-2 rocket engine was planned to be used alongside the Orbiter space tug and payload host. Following the discontinuation of the Orbiter program, Vast shifted focus towards the development of the E-2.

=== Orbiter ===
The Orbiter was an orbital transfer vehicle capable of approaching/departing spacecraft and carrying customer payload that uses ethane and nitrous oxide as propellants for use as the third stage of any launch vehicle. The Orbiter was initially planned for use as the third stage of Launcher's Light rocket, but plans for such a rocket were discontinued following Vast's acquisition of Launcher. However, further development of the Orbiter was continued within Vast as a part of Launcher's acquisition. Additionally, former Launcher missions which involved Orbiter – such as the SN3 and SN5 missions – were undertaken by Vast. Vast initially was to launch a total of 6 orbiter tugs into space from 2023 to 2025, with the SN3 mission having been launched on June 12, 2023, and SN5 originally planned to launch in October on SpaceX rideshare missions. However, following SN3's failure, the Orbiter program was discontinued. Vast now is building prototypes for key Haven-1 subsystems, such as avionics and propulsion, based around Orbiter space tugs.

=== Haven Demo ===
Vast built a 500 kg demonstration satellite, named Haven Demo, to prove out some of the technologies needed for Haven-1. It tested subsystems such as communications, power, propulsion, guidance, navigation, hardware and algorithms. On November 2, 2025, Haven Demo was launched on a Falcon 9 and successfully deployed its solar panels. It operated successfully for three months before reentering the atmosphere via a controlled deorbit burn on February 5, 2026.

=== Haven-1 ===
A rendering of the Haven-1 module in space with a docked Crew Dragon spacecraft

Haven-1 is a planned single-module space station in low Earth orbit that is currently being developed by Vast. Haven-1 is planned to act as an independent crewed space station. The station is planned to be brought to space in 2026 aboard a Falcon 9. Vast then plans to have a crew of four launch aboard a Crew Dragon spacecraft on the Vast-1 mission for about fourteen days as early as June 2026. Vast plans to have three or four such missions visit Haven-1 with several months between each. The total amount of time onboard the station will be limited by consumables, much of which will have to be launched along with the station.

The station plans to have logistics on board to facilitate docking with the Dragon spacecraft, with it being able to extend the on-orbit duration of spaceflight missions to up to 30 days. With the addition of the Dragon spacecraft, Haven-1 would be able to sustain 4-crew missions with 24/7 communication facilities, up to 1,000 watts of power, up to 150 kg of preloaded cargo mass, and science, research, and in-space manufacturing opportunities for up to 30 days. Haven-1 also plans to be able to offer a variety of amenities and facilities to paying customers, such as having a large window dome on board for photography and viewing, always-on internet through onboard Wi-Fi, resting rooms, and more.

Haven-1 is set to house a microgravity research facility, called the Haven-1 Lab, serving as the station's microgravity research, development and manufacturing platform. It will have 10 slots, each capable of accommodating payloads weighing up to 30 kilograms and consuming up to 100 watts of power.

=== Haven-2 ===
Haven-2 is a planned multi-module space station that is under development by Vast. Vast is designing Haven-2 as a commercial successor to the ISS. Although Vast did not originally submit a proposal for Phase 1 of NASA's Commercial LEO Destinations program in 2021, they plan to compete for Phase 2 in 2026. Haven-2 will begin as a single module based on Haven-1 launched on a SpaceX Falcon Heavy rocket in 2028, but stretched from 10.1 m to 16 m and including two docking ports. Vast plans to launch three more modules from 2029 to 2030, docked in a line, each with upgraded life support systems. A seven-meter Starship-launched core module will then be added, centered between the four original modules. The core module will have a fifth docking port and an airlock for Extravehicular activities. By 2032, Vast plans to add four more modules, including one with a 3.8 m cupola and one with external payload racks for scientific experiments. Each of the eight modules will have two Earth-facing 1.1 m windows.

=== Future ===
Beyond its Haven-2 space station, Vast has plans for a 110-meter "spinning stick" station by the 2030s and a fully-fledged "proliferated station fleet" by the 2040s.

== Controversy ==
In late March 2024, a complaint was filed in California alleging that a former Vast engineer was wrongfully retaliated against by Vast's CEO and CTO, resulting in the firing of the employee for allegedly engaging in a protected concerted activity and whistleblowing. The employee had claimed that Haven-1’s radio frequencies would not be in compliance with FCC regulations.

== Facilities ==
Originally based in El Segundo, California, Vast relocated its corporate headquarters to a newly built, 115,000 sq ft (10,700 m^{2}) facility in Long Beach, California. The facility hosts much of Vast's manufacturing and executive operations, with it being located in Long Beach's "Globemaster Corridor Specific Plan" in January 2023.

Vast also owns 25,000 sq ft (2,300 m^{2}) of land through its acquisition of Launcher, wherein Vast also took on Launcher's former headquarters based in Hawthorne, California.
