= Kondakov =

Kondakov (Russian: Кондаков) is a Russian masculine surname, its feminine counterpart is Kondakova.

People

- Boris Kondakov (born 1954), Russian philologist
- Daria Kondakova (born 1991), Russian rhythmic gymnast
- Denis Kondakov (born 1978), Russian football player
- Ivan Kondakov (1857–1931), Russian chemist
- Nikodim Kondakov (1844–1925), Russian art historian
- Pavel Kondakov (born 1972), Russian football player
- Sofya Kondakova (1922–2012), Soviet speed skater
- Yegor Kondakov (born 1998), Russian football player
- Yelena Kondakova (born 1957), Russian cosmonaut
- Yuliya Kondakova (born 1981), Russian hurdler
- Yuri Kondakov (born 1951), Russian/Ukrainian speed skater

Other

- Kondakov Plateau, Yakutia
- Kondakov Seminar
- 7106 Kondakov, a minor planet

== See also ==
- Kondakovo
