= Komin =

Komin may refer to:

- Komin, Dubrovnik-Neretva County, a village near Ploče, Croatia
- Komin, Zagreb County, a village near Sveti Ivan Zelina, Croatia
- Komin (surname)
- Kawamoto Kōmin (1810–1871), Japanese scholar
