= Soyuz TM-19 =

1994 Russian crewed spaceflight to Mir

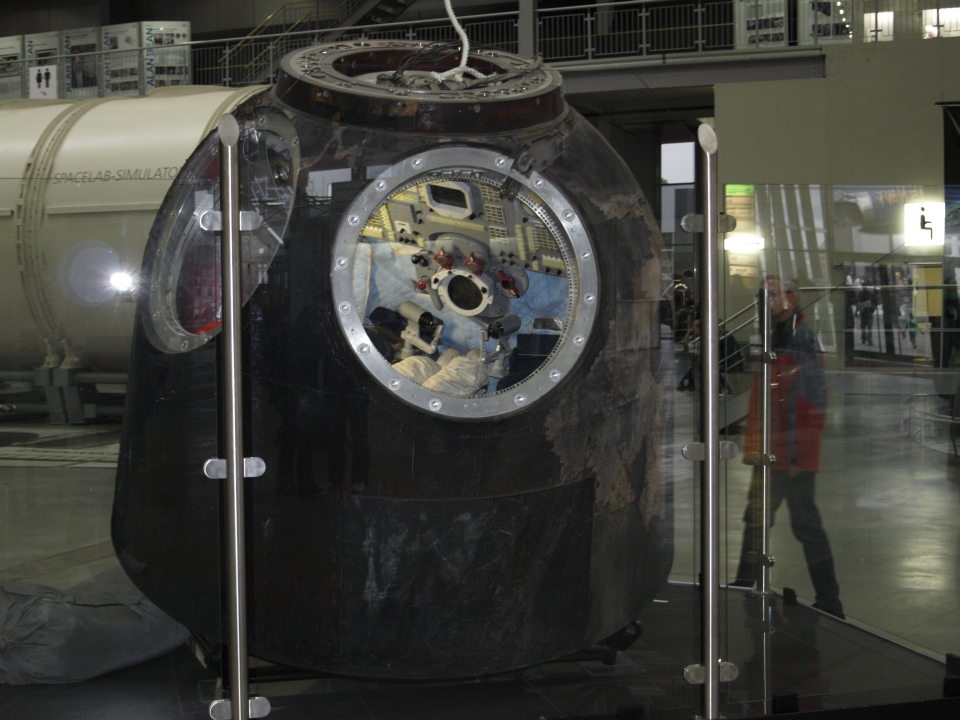
- The Soyuz TM-19 landing capsule on display at the Technik Museum Speyer
- Mission type: Mir crew transport
- Operator: Rosaviakosmos
- COSPAR ID: 1994-036A
- SATCAT no.: 23139
- Mission duration: 125 days, 22 hours, 53 minutes, 36 seconds
- Orbits completed: 1,993

Spacecraft properties
- Spacecraft: Soyuz 7K-STM No.68
- Spacecraft type: Soyuz-TM
- Manufacturer: RKK Energia
- Launch mass: 7,150 kilograms (15,760 lb)

Crew
- Crew size: 2 up 3 down
- Members: Yuri Malenchenko; Talgat Musabayev
- Landing: Ulf Merbold
- Callsign: Ага́т (Agat - Agate)

Start of mission
- Launch date: July 1, 1994, 12:24:50 UTC
- Rocket: Soyuz-U2
- Launch site: Baikonur 1/5

End of mission
- Landing date: November 4, 1994, 11:18:26 UTC
- Landing site: 88 kilometres (55 mi) northeast of Arkalyk

Orbital parameters
- Reference system: Geocentric
- Regime: Low Earth
- Perigee altitude: 396 kilometres (246 mi)
- Apogee altitude: 397 kilometres (247 mi)
- Inclination: 51.6 degrees
- Period: 92.48 minutes
- Epoch: 31 July 1994

Docking with Mir
- Docking port: Kvant-1 aft
- Docking date: 3 July 1994, 13:55:01 UTC
- Undocking date: 4 November 1994, 08:31:30 UTC
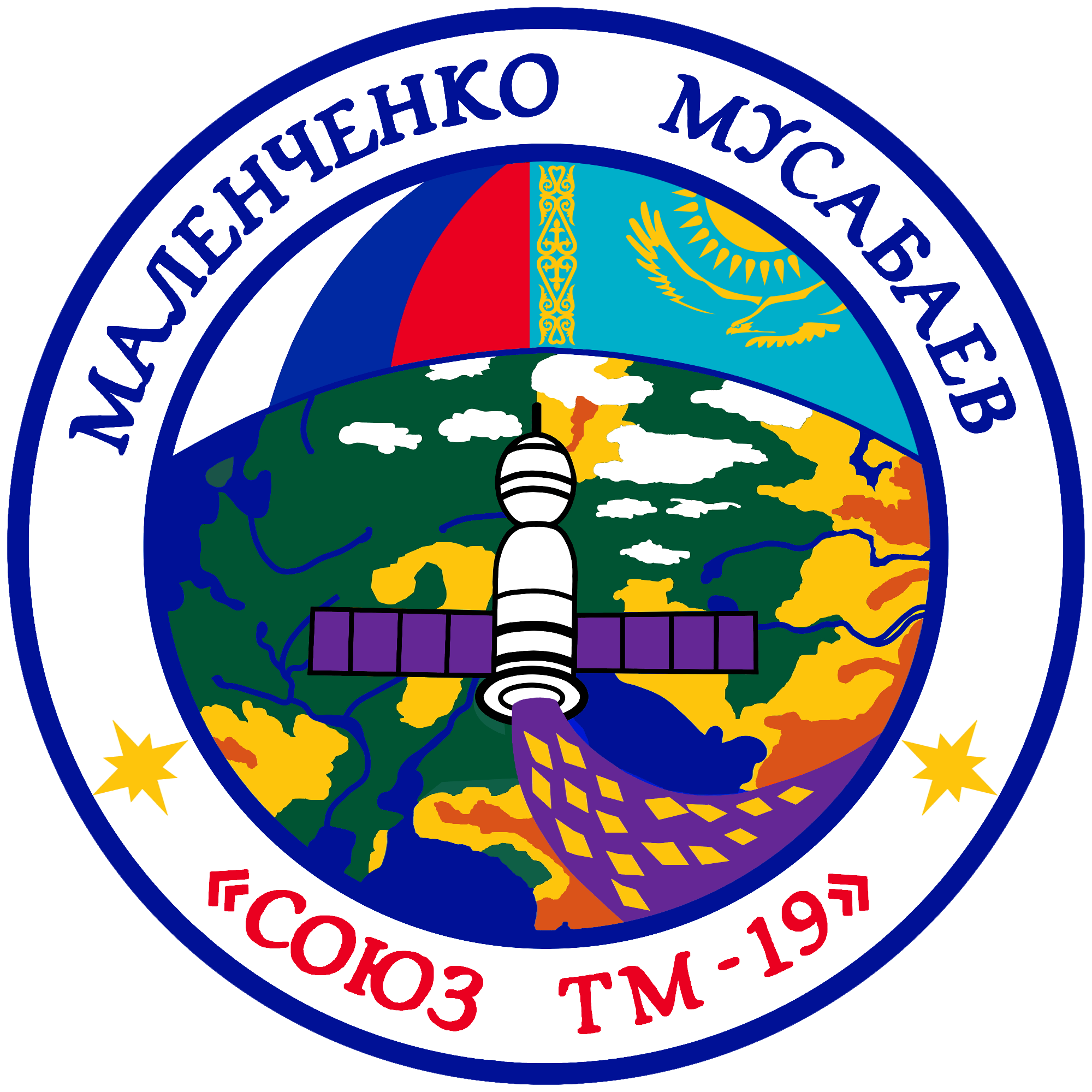
- Soyuz programme (Crewed missions)

Soyuz TM-19 was a crewed Soyuz spaceflight to space station Mir that carried Russian cosmonaut Yuri Malenchenko and Kazakh cosmonaut Talgat Musabayev, while also landing German astronaut Ulf Merbold. It launched on 1 July 1994, at 12:24:50 UTC.

== Crew ==
Position	Launching crew	Landing crew
Commander	Yuri Malenchenko; First spaceflight	
Flight engineer	Talgat Musabayev, Kazakhstan; First spaceflight	
Research cosmonaut	None	Ulf Merbold, DLR; Third and last spaceflight

== Mission highlights ==
Commander Malenchenko and flight engineer Musabayev, both spaceflight rookies, were to have been launched with veteran cosmonaut Gennadi Strekalov, who would have returned to Earth with Viktor Afanasyev and Yuri Usachov in Soyuz TM-18 after a few days on Mir. However, the cancellation of one of two Progress-M cargo ships scheduled to resupply Mir during the Agat crew's stay meant that Strekalov's couch had to carry supplies. The result was the first all-rookie Soyuz flight since Soyuz 25 in October 1977. Docking occurred without incident on July 3. Both cosmonauts and Doctor Valeri Polyakov (who had arrived on Soyuz TM-18) became the 16th resident crew; many technical problems with the station arose during this expedition, necessitating a previously untried manual supply docking by Malenchenko. On November 3, Malenchenko, Musabayev and Merbold undocked in Soyuz TM-19 and backed 190m from Mir. They then activated the Kurs automatic approach system, which successfully redocked the spacecraft. The cosmonauts then transferred back to Mir. The test was related to the difficulties Soyuz TM-20 and Progress M-24 experienced during their automatic approaches. Final undocking and reentry occurred the following day without incident.

== Mission accomplishments ==
- Docked with Mir
- Partial crew exchange
- Conducted medical experiments
- Conducted materials experiments
- Malenchenko and Musabayev perform EVA on 09.09.1994 (5h 6m) to repair station's external insulation
- Both cosmonauts repeat EVA on 14.09.1994 (6h 1m) for same purpose
- First successful manual docking of a Progress supply ship

== Spacecraft location ==
In 2010, the Energia corporation gave the Soyuz TM-19 landing capsule to the Techink Museum Speyer in Speyer, Germany, where it is exhibited as a permanent public display ever since.
