= Euromir =

International space programme

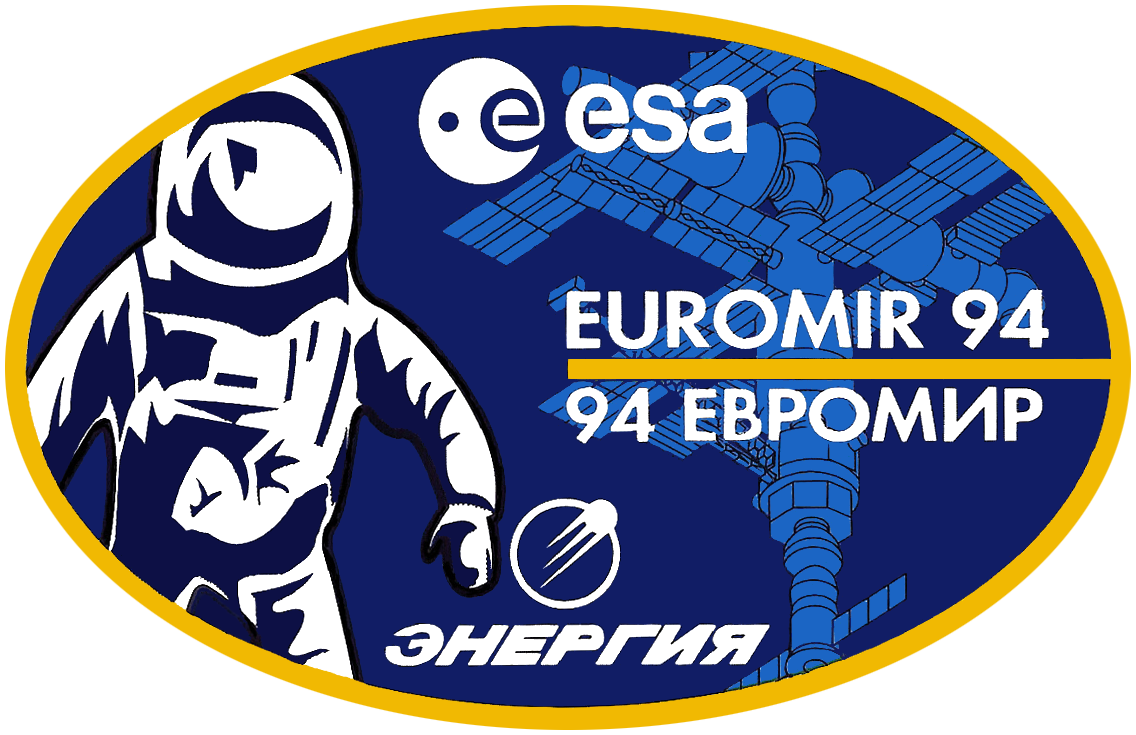
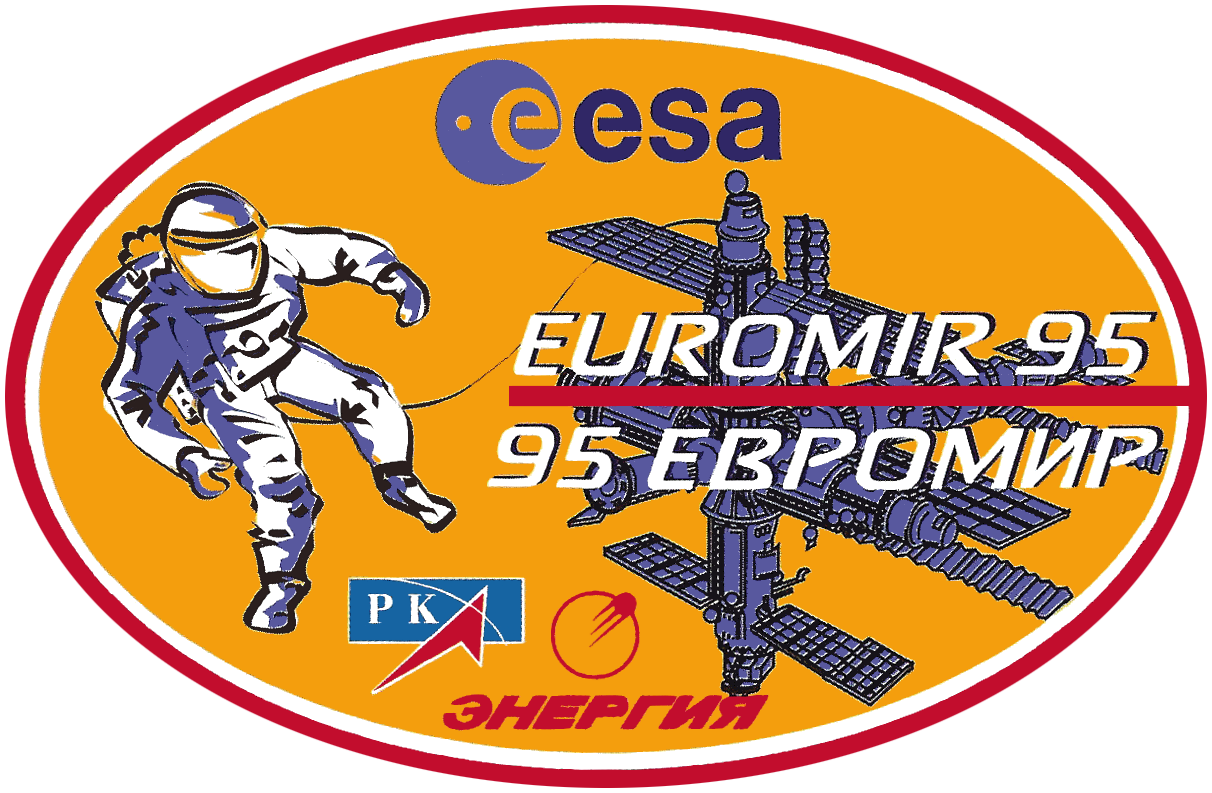
The Euromir mission logos

Euromir was an international space programme in the 1990s. Between the Russian Federal Space Agency and the European Space Agency (ESA), it would bring European astronauts to the Mir space station.

Euromir was part of a drive in the early 1990s to recruit and train European astronauts for the then-planned International Space Station (ISS). Trips on the US Space Shuttle and the Russia Mir space station would give ESA astronauts experience in space (ESA's Columbus Precursor Flights programme) and help all parties learn to have experience in international cooperation.

ESA's 1992 intake of astronauts were trained up, with two being sent to on Shuttle missions. Four were selected for Mir and an agreement was signed to train them further at the Yuri Gagarin Cosmonaut Training Centre. In 1993, a contract for two flights was signed, with Ulf Merbold and Thomas Reiter being the prime candidates for 1994 and 1995, respectively. Pedro Duque and Christer Fuglesang were chosen as backups. They were trained on Russian language and the systems of Soyuz and Mir.

Merbold and Reiter flew on EuroMir 94 (Soyuz TM-20/Soyuz TM-19) and EuroMir 95 (Soyuz TM-22), respectively. During Reiter's mission, he performed two spacewalks.

== See also ==
- List of European Space Agency programmes and missions
- Spacelab
- European contribution to ISS
