= Komin (surname) =

Komin (Russian: Комин) is a Russian masculine surname, its feminine counterpart is Komina. The surname may refer to the following notable people:

- Aleksandr Komin (cyclist) (born 1995), Russian cyclist
- Aleksandr Komin (killer) (1953–1999), Russian slave-owner and serial killer
- Rimma Komina (1926–1995), Russian literary critic
