= Christer Fuglesang =

Swedish physicist and ESA astronaut (born 1957)

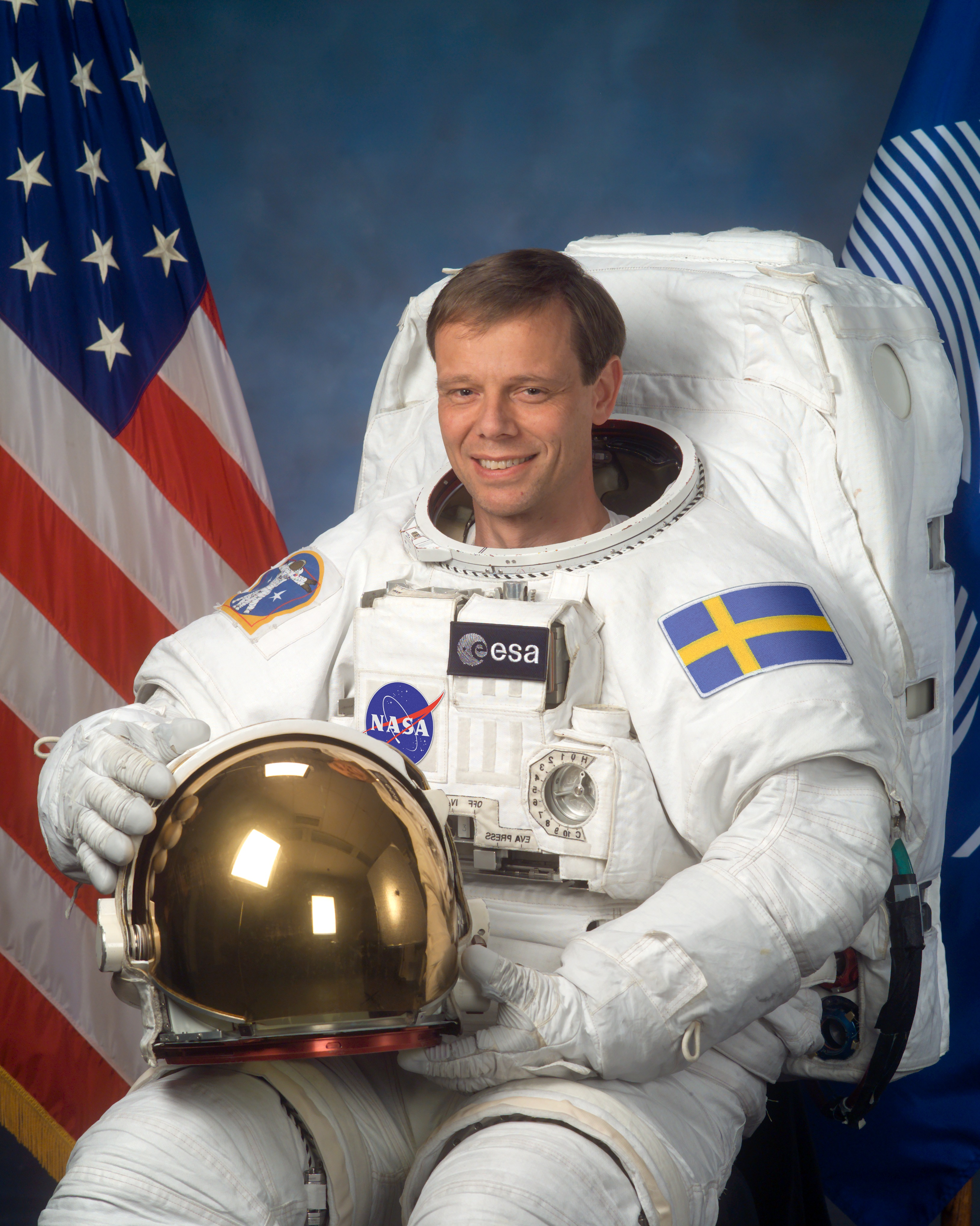
- Christer Fuglesang in January 2003
- Born: 18 March 1957 (age 69); Stockholm, Sweden
- Other name: Arne Christer Fuglesang
- Education: Royal Institute of Technology (MSc); Stockholm University (PhD)
- Occupation: Physicist
- Space career

ESA astronaut
- Status: Retired
- Time in space: 26d 17h 38 m
- Selection: 1992 ESA Group/NASA Group 16 (1996)
- Total EVAs: 5
- Total EVA time: 31 hours 54 minutes
- Missions: STS-116, STS-128
- Scientific career
- Fields: Physics
- Thesis: Particle production at the CERN pp collider (1987)

Arne Christer Fuglesang (born 18 March 1957) is a Swedish physicist and an ESA astronaut. He was first launched aboard the STS-116 Space Shuttle mission on 10 December 2006, making him the first Swedish citizen in space.

Married with three children, he was a Fellow at CERN and taught mathematics at the Royal Institute of Technology before being selected to join the European Astronaut Corps in 1992. He has participated in two Space Shuttle missions and five spacewalks, and is the first person outside of the United States or Russian space programs to participate in more than three spacewalks.

== Early life and education ==
Fuglesang was born in Stockholm to a Swedish mother and a Norwegian father, who became a Swedish citizen shortly before Fuglesang's birth. Fuglesang graduated from the Bromma Gymnasium, Stockholm in 1975, earned a master's degree in engineering physics from the Royal Institute of Technology (KTH), in Stockholm in 1981, and received a doctorate in experimental particle physics from Stockholm University in 1987. He became an associate professor (docent) of particle physics at Stockholm University in 1991.

He married Elisabeth (Lisa) Fuglesang (née Walldie) in 1983, whom he met at the Royal Institute of Technology (KTH). They have three children.

Fuglesang is a prominent member of the Swedish skeptics association Vetenskap och Folkbildning and identifies strongly with skeptics and atheists.

In 2012, Fuglesang received the Royal Institute of Technology 2012 Alumni of the Year award.

== Career ==
As a graduate student, Fuglesang worked at CERN in Geneva on the UA5 experiment, which studied proton–antiproton collisions. In 1988 he became a Fellow of CERN, where he worked on the CPLEAR experiment studying the subtle CP-violation of kaon particles. After a year he became a Senior Fellow and head of the particle identification subdetector. In November 1990, Fuglesang obtained a position at the Manne Siegbahn Institute of Physics, Stockholm, but remained stationed at CERN for another year working towards the new Large Hadron Collider project. Since 1990, when stationed in Sweden, Fuglesang taught mathematics at the Royal Institute of Technology.

In May 1992, Fuglesang was selected to join the European Astronaut Corps of the European Space Agency (ESA) based at the European Astronaut Centre (EAC) in Cologne, Germany. In 1992 he attended an introductory training programme at EAC and a four-week training program at the Yuri Gagarin Cosmonaut Training Center (TsPK) in Star City, Russia, with a view to future ESA–Russian collaboration on the Mir Space Station. In July 1993, he completed the basic astronaut training course at EAC.

In May 1993, Fuglesang and fellow ESA astronaut Thomas Reiter were selected for the Euromir 95 mission and commenced training at TsPK (Moscow) in preparation for their onboard engineer tasks, extra-vehicular activities (spacewalks) and operation of the Soyuz spacecraft. The Euromir 95 experiment training was organized and mainly carried out at EAC.

On 17 March 1995 he was selected as a member of Crew 2, the backup crew for the Euromir 95 mission, joining Gennadi Manakov and Pavel Vinogradov. During the mission, which lasted 179 days, Fuglesang was the prime crew interface coordinator. From the Russian Mission Control Center (TsUP) in Korolyov, he was the main contact with ESA Astronaut, Thomas Reiter, on Mir, and acted as coordinator between Mir and the Euromir 95 Payloads Operations Control Center, located in Oberpfaffenhofen, Germany, and project management. Between March and June 1996, he underwent specialized training in TsPK on Soyuz operations for de-docking, atmospheric re-entry and landing.

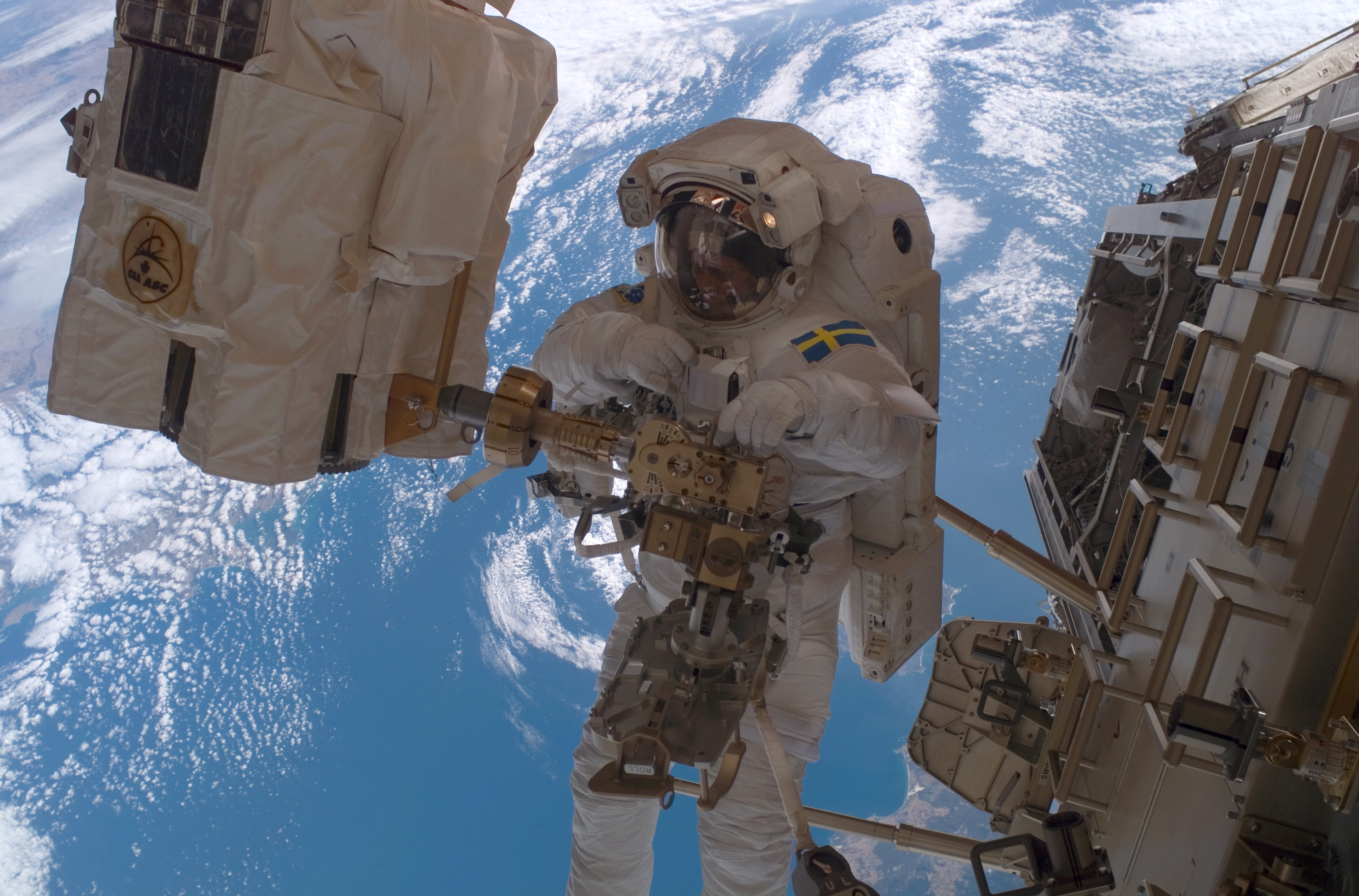
Christer Fuglesang participating in EVA on STS-116

In 1996, ESA selected Fuglesang to train as a mission specialist for NASA Space Shuttle missions. He joined the Mission Specialist Class at NASA Johnson Space Center, Houston, in August 1996, and qualified for flight assignment as a mission specialist in April 1998.

From May to October 1998, he resumed training at TsPK on Soyuz-TM spacecraft operations for de-docking, atmospheric re-entry and landing. He was awarded the Russian Soyuz Return Commander certificate, which qualifies him to command a three-person Soyuz capsule on its return from space.

In October 1998, he returned to NASA and was assigned technical duties in the Station Operations System Branch of the NASA Astronaut Office, working on Russian Soyuz and Progress transfer vehicles. Later he worked as prime Increment Crew Support Astronaut for the second International Space Station expedition crew. Fuglesang also continued with some scientific work and was involved with the SilEye experiment which investigated light flashes in astronauts' eyes on Mir between 1995 and 1999. This work is continuing on the International Space Station (ISS) with the Alteino and ALTEA apparatuses. He has also initiated the DESIRE project to simulate and estimate the radiation environment inside ISS.

== Missions ==
=== STS-116 ===
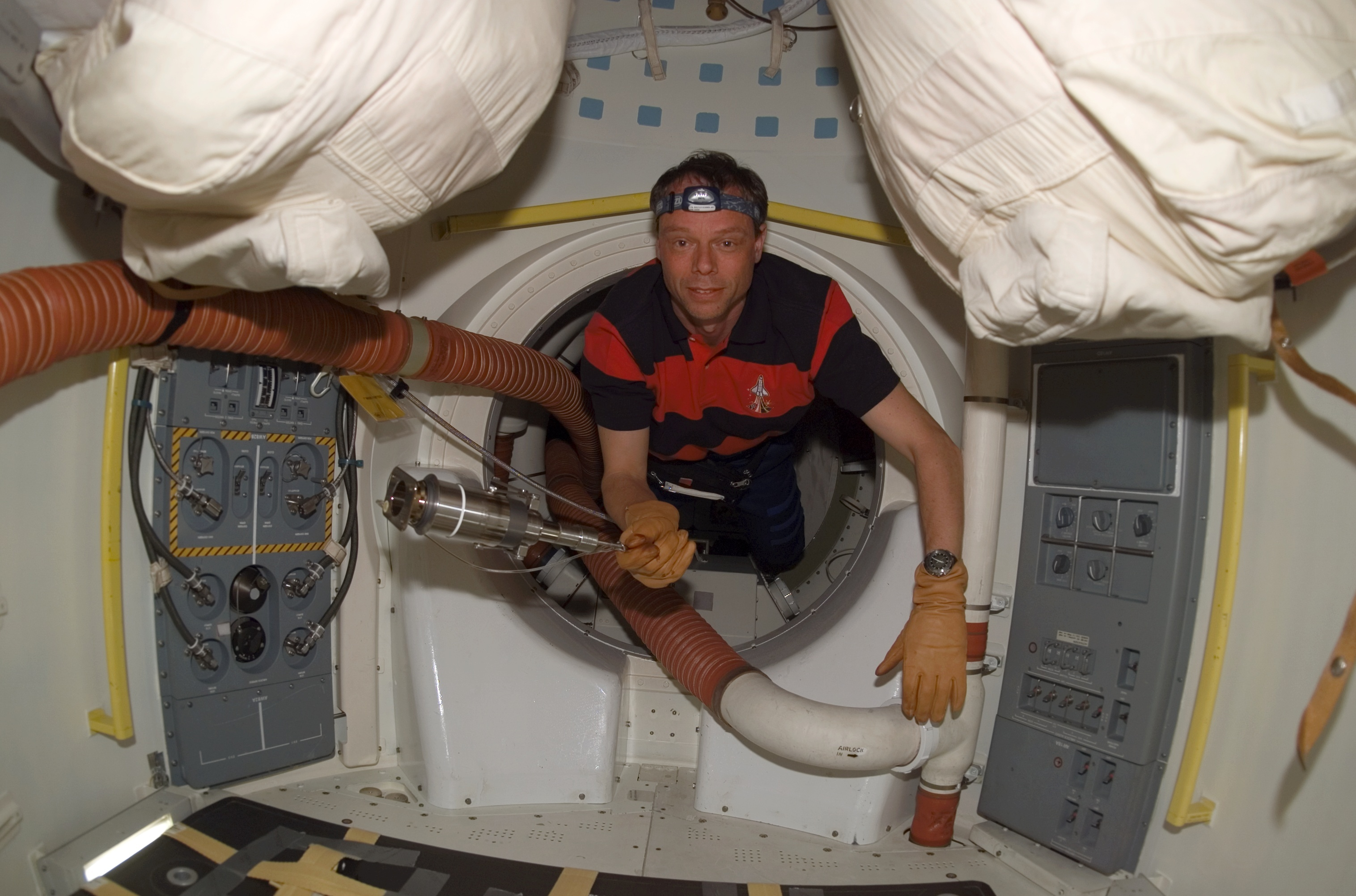
Fuglesang at work, floating through a hatch on Space Shuttle Discovery during flight on day two of Mission STS-116.

Fuglesang's first spaceflight mission was as a mission specialist on STS-116 in 2006, an assembly and crew-rotation mission to the International Space Station. This flight was called the Celsius Mission by ESA in recognition of Anders Celsius, the Swedish 18th-century astronomer who invented the Celsius temperature scale. The original iteration of STS-116 was planned to launch in July 2003, utilizing Space Shuttle Atlantis, but the mission was postponed for more than three years due to the Space Shuttle Columbia disaster and the subsequent multi-year grounding of the fleet by the Bush administration. When STS-116 launched at last in December 2006, it did so with a modified crew complement aboard Space Shuttle Discovery, with Fuglesang retained as mission specialist.

==== Spacewalks during STS-116 Mission ====
- First spacewalk with the primary task of Installation of the P5 truss segment performed together with Astronaut Robert Curbeam as EV1, 12 December.
- EV2 during second spacewalk which included first part of rewiring the power system of the ISS specifically channel 2 and 3. Also performed together with Astronaut Robert Curbeam as EV1, 14 December.
- An extra spacewalk (EVA4) attempting, successfully, to fix a problem when retracting a solar panel. Also performed together with Astronaut Robert Curbeam as EV1, 18 December. EVA duration: 6h 38min.

Total EVA time during STS-116: 18 hours and 15 minutes.

==== 'Maximum Time Aloft' ====
Fuglesang, once a Swedish national Frisbee champion, held the national title in "maximum time aloft" in 1978, and subsequently competed in the 1981 World Frisbee Championship. Fuglesang took one of his personal frisbees to the International Space Station. On Dec 15 in 2006, he set a new "world record" for Time Aloft by free-floating a spinning frisbee for 20 seconds in the microgravity environment of the ISS. It was done during a live broadcast interview with a space exhibition in Stockholm Sweden. The record attempt was recognised by the sports governing body, the World Flying Disc Federation, and the record was accepted. But since it was set "outside the earth's atmosphere" it was recorded as 'Galactic Record'.

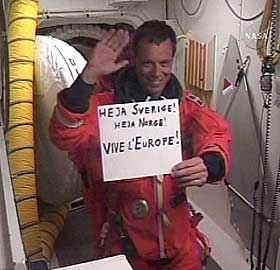
Fuglesang greeting Sweden, Norway and Europe from the launch pad.

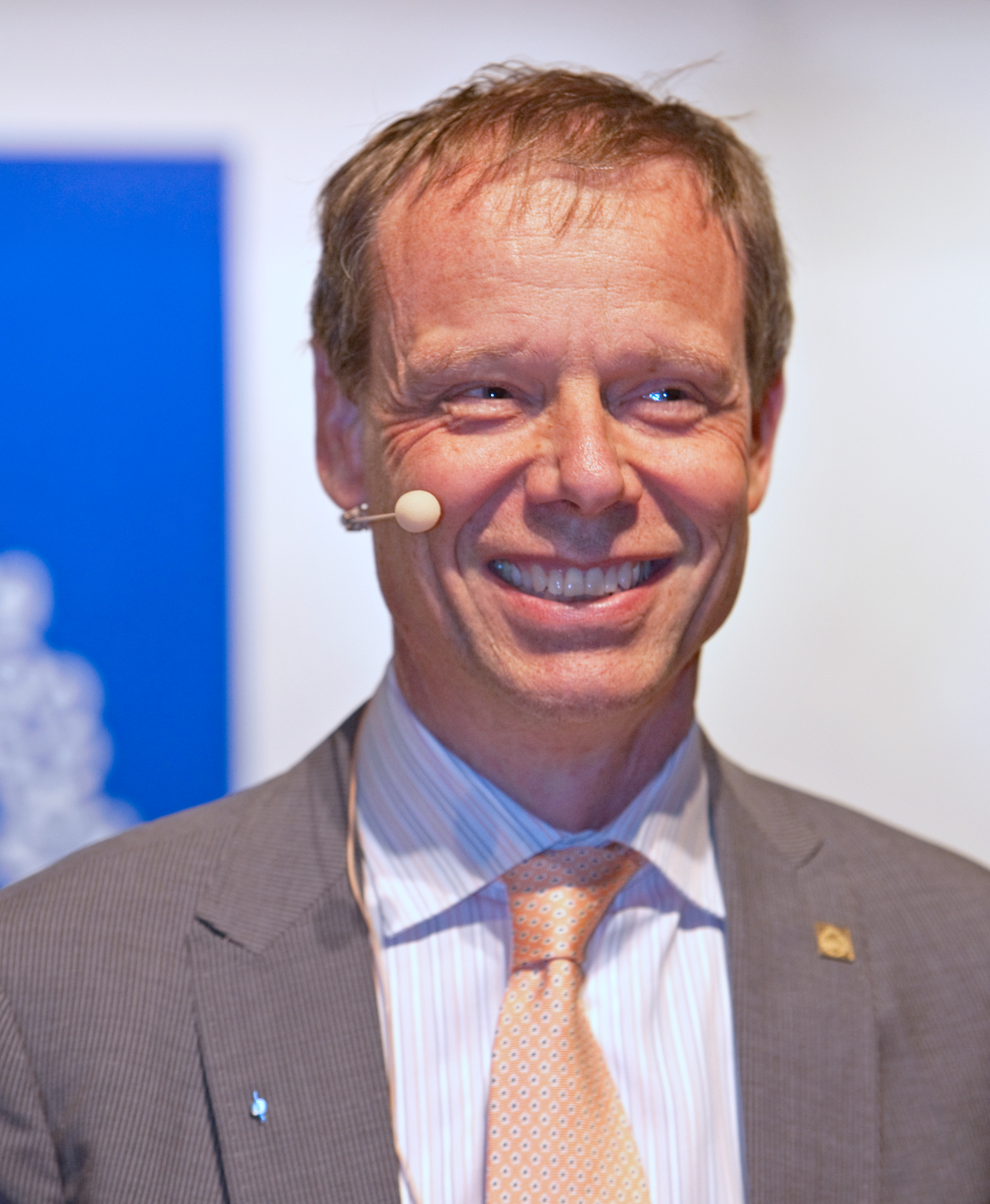
Christer Fuglesang at the Royal Institute of Technology Alumni of the Year award ceremony in Stockholm 2012

=== STS-128 ===
On 15 July 2008 Fuglesang was selected as a mission specialist of the STS-128, launched on 28–29 August 2009. STS-128 (ISS assembly mission "17A") delivered equipment allowing the ISS crew to be expanded from three to six astronauts.

During STS-128 Fuglesang also became the first spacewalker outside Russia and United States to do more than three spacewalks. With the completion of two more EVAs, he has performed five spacewalks.

=== EVA ===
Total EVA time from five spacewalks adds up to 31 hours 54 minutes giving Fuglesang a 29th place in history as of 14 September 2009.

== Autobiography ==
In 2007, Fuglesang published his autobiography, a photo book co-written by Swedish journalist Johan Tell. Being born the same year at the launch of Sputnik (1957) made him a child of the space age, he writes. His admiration for cosmonautes and astronautes was thus awakened at an early age. He attended Gagarin's memorial in 1993, March 27th. Fuglesang does not, however, believe that Gagarin claimed not to have seen God in space and thus concluded he didn't exist.

== Award and honors ==
- Honorary Doctorate from Umeå University, Sweden, 1999
- Honorary Doctorate from the University of Nova Gorica, Slovenia, 2007
- NASA Space Flight Medal, 2007
- H. M. The King's Medal (Stockholm, 2007).
- NASA Exceptional Service Medal, 2010
