= STS-84 =

1997 American crewed spaceflight to Mir

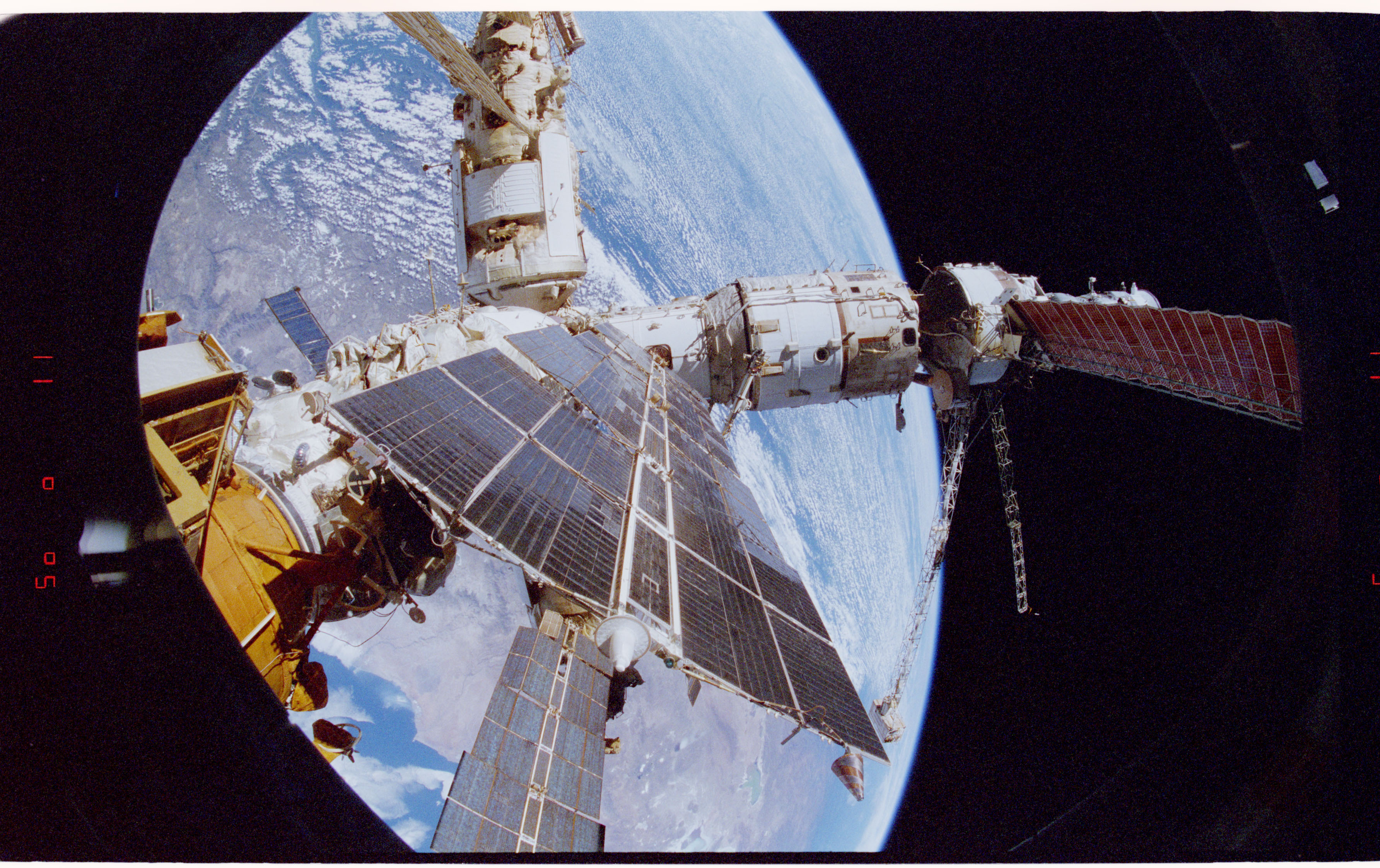
- Mir viewed from the flight deck of Atlantis
- Names: Space Transportation System-84
- Mission type: Shuttle-Mir
- Operator: NASA
- COSPAR ID: 1997-023A
- SATCAT no.: 24804
- Mission duration: 9 days, 4 hours, 19 minutes, 55 seconds
- Distance travelled: 6,000,000 kilometres (3,700,000 mi)
- Orbits completed: 144

Spacecraft properties
- Spacecraft: Space Shuttle Atlantis
- Landing mass: 100,285 kilograms (221,091 lb)

Crew
- Crew size: 7
- Members: Charles J. Precourt; Eileen M. Collins; Jean-François Clervoy; Carlos I. Noriega; Edward T. Lu; Yelena V. Kondakova
- Launching: C. Michael Foale
- Landing: Jerry M. Linenger

Start of mission
- Launch date: 15 May 1997, 09:07:48.62 UTC
- Launch site: Kennedy, LC-39A

End of mission
- Landing date: 24 May 1997, 13:27:44 UTC
- Landing site: Kennedy, SLF Runway 33

Orbital parameters
- Reference system: Geocentric
- Regime: Low Earth
- Perigee altitude: 377 kilometres (234 mi)
- Apogee altitude: 393 kilometres (244 mi)
- Inclination: 51.7 degrees
- Period: 92.3 min

Docking with Mir
- Docking port: SO starboard
- Docking date: 17 May 1997, 02:33:20 UTC
- Undocking date: 22 May 1997, 01:03:56 UTC
- Time docked: 4 days, 22 hours, 30 minutes 36 seconds
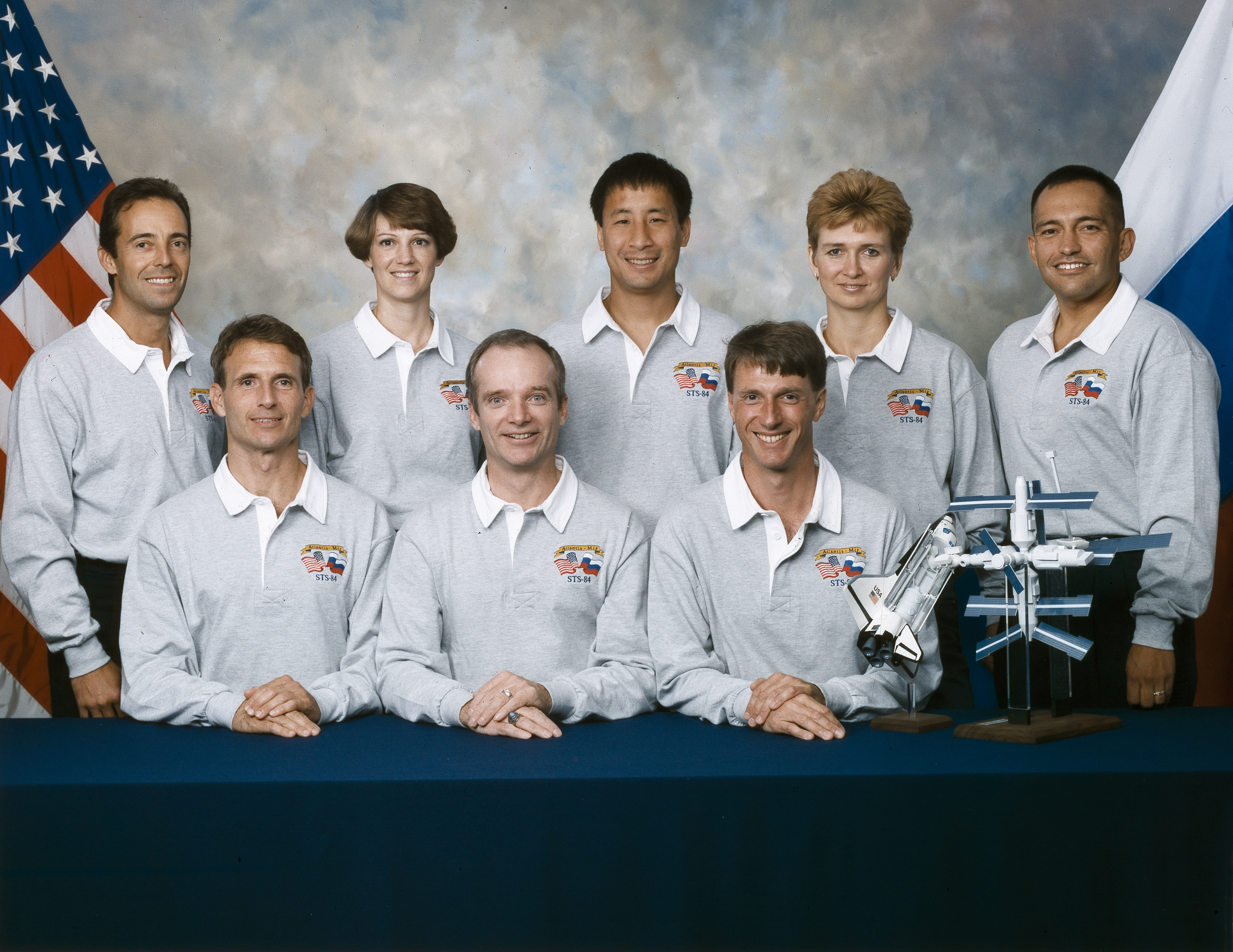
- Left to right – Seated: Linenger, Precourt, Foale; Standing: Clervoy, Collins, Lu, Kondakova, Noriega Space Shuttle program

STS-84 was a crewed spaceflight mission by Space Shuttle Atlantis to the Mir space station.

== Crew ==
Position	Launching Astronaut	Landing Astronaut
Commander	(United States) Charles Precourt; Third spaceflight	
Pilot	(United States) Eileen M. Collins; Second spaceflight	
Mission Specialist 1	(France) Jean-François Clervoy, ESA; Second spaceflight	
Mission Specialist 2 Flight Engineer	(Peru) (United States) Carlos I. Noriega; First spaceflight	
Mission Specialist 3	(United States) Edward T. Lu; First spaceflight	
Mission Specialist 4	(Russia) Yelena V. Kondakova, RKA; Second and last spaceflight	
Mission Specialist 5	(United States) / (United Kingdom) Michael Foale; EO-23; Fourth spaceflight	(United States) Jerry M. Linenger; EO-23; Second and last spaceflight

=== Crew seat assignments ===
Seat	Launch	Landing	Seats 1–4 are on the flight deck. Seats 5–7 are on the mid-deck.
1	Precourt		Seats 1–4 are on the flight deck. Seats 5–7 are on the mid-deck.
2	Collins		Seats 1–4 are on the flight deck. Seats 5–7 are on the mid-deck.
3	Clervoy	Lu	Seats 1–4 are on the flight deck. Seats 5–7 are on the mid-deck.
4	Noriega		Seats 1–4 are on the flight deck. Seats 5–7 are on the mid-deck.
5	Lu	Clervoy	Seats 1–4 are on the flight deck. Seats 5–7 are on the mid-deck.
6	Kondakova		Seats 1–4 are on the flight deck. Seats 5–7 are on the mid-deck.
7	Foale	Linenger	Seats 1–4 are on the flight deck. Seats 5–7 are on the mid-deck.

== Mission highlights ==
The STS-84 mission was the sixth Shuttle/Mir docking mission and is part of the NASA/Mir program which consisted of nine Shuttle-Mir dockings and seven long duration flights of U.S. astronauts aboard the Russian space station. The prior Shuttle-Mir missions were STS-71, STS-74, STS-76, STS-79 and STS-81. The U.S. astronauts launched and landed on a Shuttle and served as Mir crew members while the Russian Mir crewmembers used their Soyuz vehicle for launch and landing. This series of missions expanded U.S. research on Mir by providing resupply materials for experiments to be performed aboard the station as well as returning experiment samples and data to Earth.

STS-84 involved the transfer of 3,318 kilograms (7,315 lb) of water and logistics to and from the Mir. During the docked phase, 465 kilograms (1,025 lb) of water, 383.2 kilograms (845 lb) of U.S. science equipment, 1,168.6 kilograms (2,576 lb) of Russian logistics along with 178.1 kilograms (393 lb) of miscellaneous material were transferred to Mir. Returning to Earth aboard Atlantis were 407.1 kilograms (898 lb) of U.S. science material, 531.2 kilograms (1,171 lb) of Russian logistics, 14 kilograms (31 lb) of ESA material and 170.7 kilograms (376 lb) of miscellaneous material.

Sixth Shuttle-Mir docking highlighted by transfer of fourth successive U.S. crew member to the Russian Space Station. U.S. astronaut C. Michael Foale exchanged places with Jerry Linenger, who arrived at Mir 15 January 1997 with the crew of Shuttle Mission STS-81. Linenger spent 123 days on Mir and just over 132 days in space from launch to landing, placing him second behind U.S. astronaut Shannon Lucid for most time spent on-orbit by an American. Another milestone reached during his stay was one-year anniversary of continuous U.S. presence in space that began with Lucid's arrival at Mir 22 March 1996.

Other significant events during Linenger's stay included first U.S.-Russian space walk. On 29 April 1997 Linenger participated in five-hour extravehicular activity (EVA) with Mir 23 Commander Vasily Tsibliyev to attach a monitor to the outside of the station. The Optical Properties Monitor (OPM) was to remain on Mir for nine months to allow study of the effect of the space environment on optical properties, such as mirrors used in telescopes.

On 23 February, a fire broke out on the 11-year-old station. It caused minimal damage but required station's inhabitants to wear protective masks for about 36 hours until cabin air was cleaned. Besides Linenger, crew members aboard Mir at the time included two Mir 22 cosmonauts and a German cosmonaut, and two Mir 23 cosmonauts.

STS-84 docking with Mir occurred on 17 May at 02:33 UTC above the Adriatic Sea. Hatches between two spacecraft opened at 04:25 am, 17 May. Greetings exchanged between STS-84 crew and Mir 23 Commander Vasily Tsibliyev, Flight Engineer Aleksandr Lazutkin and Linenger, followed by a safety briefing. Linenger and Foale officially traded places at 14:15 UTC.

Transfer of items to and from Mir proceeded smoothly and was completed ahead of schedule. One of the first items transferred to station was an Elektron oxygen-generating unit. Altogether about 249 items were moved between the two spacecraft, and about 450 kilograms (990 lb) of water moved to Mir, for a total of about 3,400 kilograms (7,500 lb) of water, experiment samples, supplies and hardware.

The research program conducted by Foale featured 35 investigations total (33 on Mir, two on STS-84, and another preflight/postflight) in six disciplines: advanced technology, Earth observations and remote sensing, fundamental biology, human life sciences, space station risk mitigation, and microgravity sciences. Twenty-eight of these were conducted during previous missions and were to be continued, repeated or completed during Foale's stay. Seven new experiments were planned in biological and crystal growth studies and materials processing.

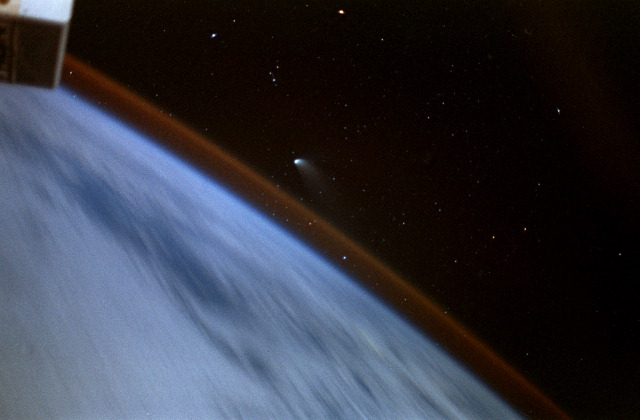
Comet Hale–Bopp imaged by a shuttle crew member

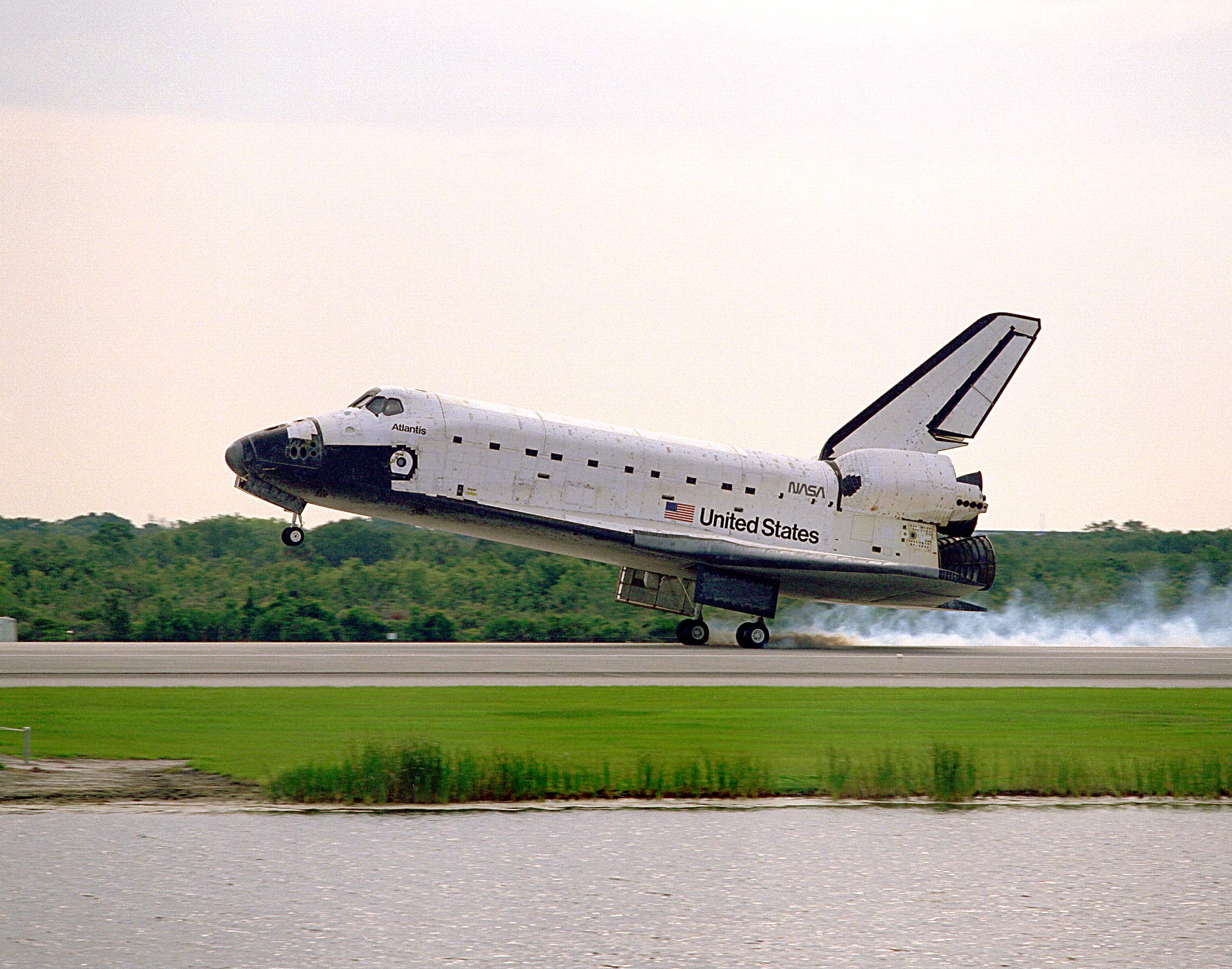
Atlantis lands at the end of the STS-84 mission.

Undocking occurred at 01:04 UTC on 22 May. Unlike prior dockings, no flyaround of the station by the orbiter was conducted, but the orbiter was stopped three times while backing away to collect data from a European sensor device designed to assist future rendezvous of a proposed European Space Agency resupply vehicle with the International Space Station.

Other activities conducted during the mission included investigations using the Biorack facility, located in the SPACEHAB Double Module in Atlantis's payload bay, a photo survey of Mir during docked operations, environmental air samplings and radiation monitoring.

Orbiter performance was normal from launch to landing. For the mission, Atlantis was equipped with a 4,187-kilogram (9,231 lb) SpaceHab Double Module, and a 1,922-kilogram (4,237 lb) Orbiter Docking System.

== See also ==
- List of human spaceflights
- List of Space Shuttle missions
- Outline of space science
