= Kondakovo =

Kondakovo (Russian: Кондаково) is the name of several rural localities in Russia:

- Kondakovo, Ryazan Oblast, a village in Ryazan Oblast
- Kondakovo, Vladimir Oblast, a village in Vladimir Oblast
- Kondakovo, Yaroslavl Oblast, a selo in Yaroslavl Oblast
