= Rimma Komina =

- Rimma Komina
- Born: 30 May 1926; Zlatoust, Chelyabinskaya Oblast', USSR
- Died: 12 October 1995; Perm, Russia

Academic background
- Education: Faculty of Philology, Moscow State University (1949)

Academic work
- Main interests: Linguistics

Rimma Vasilyevna Komina (Russian: Ри́мма Васи́льевна Кóмина, Russian pronunciation: [ˈrʲimə vɐˈsiljʲɪvnə ˈkomʲɪnə]) was a Soviet and Russian specialist in literary criticism, Doctor of Philology, professor (1985), dean of the philological faculty at Perm State University (1977–1982), the author of handbook "Contemporary Soviet literature" (1984), one of the key people in cultural life in Perm in the 1970s and 1980s. Her famous students are Jury Belikov and Boris Kondakov.

== Sources ==
- Rimma Komina at Russian Wikipedia: Комина, Римма Васильевна // Википедия, свободная энциклопедия.
