= Kondakovo, Vladimir Oblast =

Kondakovo Кондаково
- Village
- Location within Vladimir Oblast Location within Russia
- Coordinates: 55°33′N 41°41′E
- Country: Russia
- Region: Vladimir Oblast
- District: Melenkovsky District
- Time zone: UTC+3:00

Kondakovo (Russian: Кондаково) is a rural locality (a village) in Denyatinskoye Rural Settlement, Melenkovsky District, Vladimir Oblast, Russia. The population was 160 as of 2010. There are 4 streets.

== Geography ==
Kondakovo is located 28 km (17 mi) north of Melenki (the district's administrative centre) by road. Rozhdestveno is the nearest rural locality.
