= Pavel Kondakov =

Russian footballer

Personal information
- Full name: Pavel Aleksandrovich Kondakov
- Date of birth: 27 November 1972 (age 53)
- Height: 1.89 m (6 ft 2 1/2 in)
- Position: Goalkeeper

Youth career
- Yaroslavets Yaroslavl

Senior career*
Years	Team	Apps	(Gls)
1989	FC ShVSM Yaroslavl		
1991–1996	FC Shinnik Yaroslavl	68	(0)
- * Club domestic league appearances and goals

Pavel Aleksandrovich Kondakov (Russian: Павел Александрович Кондаков; born 27 November 1972) is a former Russian football player.
