= Soyuz TM-20 =

1994 Russian crewed spaceflight to Mir

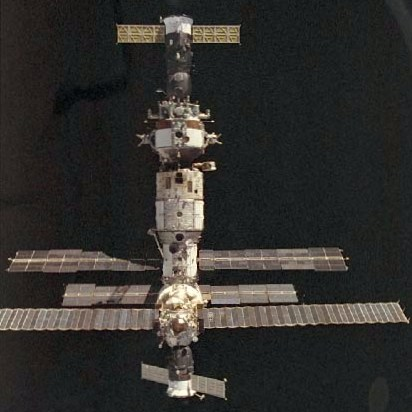
- Mir as seen from Space Shuttle Discovery during STS-63, with Soyuz TM-20 seen at the top
- Mission type: Mir crew transport
- Operator: Rosaviakosmos
- COSPAR ID: 1994-063A
- SATCAT no.: 23288
- Mission duration: 169 days, 5 hours, 21 minutes, 35 seconds
- Orbits completed: ~2,760

Spacecraft properties
- Spacecraft: Soyuz 7K-STM No.69
- Spacecraft type: Soyuz-TM
- Manufacturer: RKK Energia
- Launch mass: 7,170 kilograms (15,810 lb)

Crew
- Crew size: 3
- Members: Aleksandr Viktorenko; Yelena Kondakova
- Launching: Ulf Merbold
- Landing: Valeri Polyakov
- Callsign: Ви́тязь (Vityaz' – Knight)

Start of mission
- Launch date: October 3, 1994, 22:42:30 UTC
- Rocket: Soyuz-U2
- Launch site: Baikonur 1/5

End of mission
- Landing date: March 22, 1995, 04:04:05 UTC
- Landing site: 50.52°N 67.35°E

Orbital parameters
- Reference system: Geocentric
- Regime: Low Earth
- Perigee altitude: 392 kilometres (244 mi)
- Apogee altitude: 394 kilometres (245 mi)
- Inclination: 51.6 degrees
- Period: 92.42 minutes
- Epoch: 3 November 1994

Docking with Mir
- Docking port: Core forward
- Docking date: 6 October 1994, 00:28:15 UTC
- Undocking date: 22 March 1995, 00:43:08 UTC
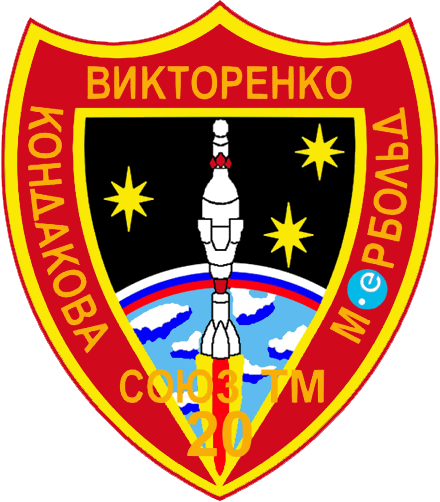
- Soyuz programme (Crewed missions)

Soyuz TM-20 was the twentieth expedition to the Russian Space Station Mir. It launched Russian cosmonauts Aleksandr Viktorenko, Yelena Kondakova, and German cosmonaut Ulf Merbold.

== Crew ==
Position	Launching crew	Landing crew
Commander	Aleksandr Viktorenko; Fourth and last spaceflight	
Flight engineer	Yelena Kondakova; First spaceflight	
Research cosmonaut	Ulf Merbold, DLR; Third and last spaceflight	Valeri Polyakov; Second and last spaceflight

== Mission highlights ==
The flight carried 10 kg of equipment for use by Merbold in ESA's month-long Euromir 94 experiment program. During automatic approach to Mir's front port, the spacecraft yawed unexpectedly. Viktorenko completed a manual docking without additional incident.

== See also ==
- Timeline of longest spaceflights
