= Progress M-24 =

1994 Russian uncrewed cargo spacecraft

- A Progress-M spacecraft
- Mission type: Mir resupply
- COSPAR ID: 1994-052A
- SATCAT no.: 23215

Spacecraft properties
- Spacecraft type: Progress-M 11F615A55
- Manufacturer: NPO Energia
- Launch mass: 7,250 kilograms (15,980 lb)

Start of mission
- Launch date: 25 August 1994, 14:25:12 UTC
- Rocket: Soyuz-U
- Launch site: Baikonur Site 1/5

End of mission
- Disposal: Deorbited
- Decay date: 4 October 1994, 22:43 UTC

Orbital parameters
- Reference system: Geocentric
- Regime: Low Earth
- Inclination: 51.6 degrees

Docking with Mir
- Docking port: Core Forward
- Docking date: 2 September 1994, 13:30:28 UTC
- Undocking date: 4 October 1994, 18:55:52 UTC
- Time docked: 32.2 days

Progress M-24 (Russian: Прогресс М-24) was a Russian uncrewed cargo spacecraft which was launched in 1994 to resupply the Mir space station; causing minor damage to the station as the result of a collision during a failed attempt to dock.

== Spacecraft ==
The forty-second of sixty four Progress spacecraft to visit Mir, M-24 used the Progress-M 11F615A55 configuration, and had the serial number 224. It carried supplies including food, water and oxygen for the EO-16 crew aboard Mir, as well as equipment for conducting scientific research, and fuel for adjusting the station's orbit and performing manoeuvres. Amongst its cargo were two new spacesuits, three fire extinguishers, oxygen candles, and equipment to facilitate repairs to Mir's life support system.

== Flight ==
Progress M-24 was launched at 14:25:12 UTC on 25 August 1994, atop a Soyuz-U carrier rocket flying from Site 1/5 at the Baikonur Cosmodrome. Following two days of free flight, it approached the forward port of Mir's core module on 27 August, however an attempt to dock with the station failed. A second attempt was made on 30 August, however this also failed, with the Progress colliding with the space station. Following these failures of the automated docking system, a manual docking using TORU, under the control of cosmonaut Yuri Malenchenko, was performed at 13:30:28 on 2 September.

Progress M-24 undocked from Mir at 18:55:52 UTC on 4 October 1994, manoeuvring away from the station and beginning a deorbit burn at 21:44. The spacecraft was destroyed during reentry over the Pacific Ocean at 22:43:00.

== See also ==
- 1994 in spaceflight
- List of Progress flights
- List of uncrewed spaceflights to Mir
- Progress M-34
