= Thomas Reiter =

German test pilot, airman and astronaut (born 1958)

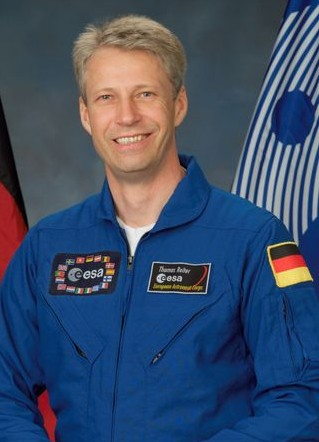
- Born: 23 May 1958 (age 68); Frankfurt, West Germany
- Occupation: Test pilot
- Awards
- Space career

ESA astronaut
- Status: Retired
- Rank: Brigadier General, Luftwaffe (Bundeswehr)
- Time in space: 350d 05h 44min
- Selection: 1992 ESA Group
- Total EVAs: 3 (2 during Mir EO-20, 1 during ISS expedition 13)
- Total EVA time: 14h, 16m
- Missions: Soyuz TM-22, (Euromir 95), STS-121/116 (Expedition 13/14)
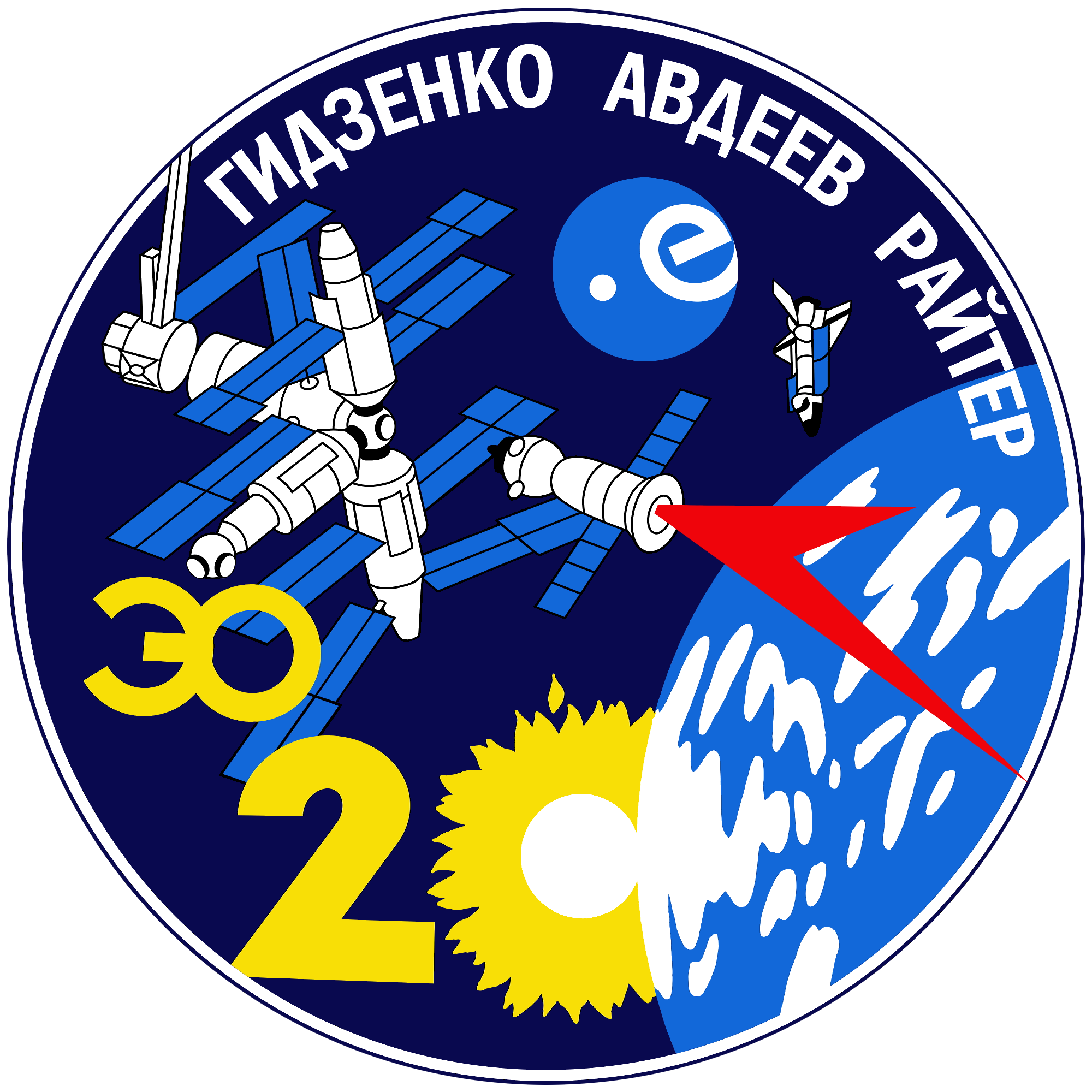
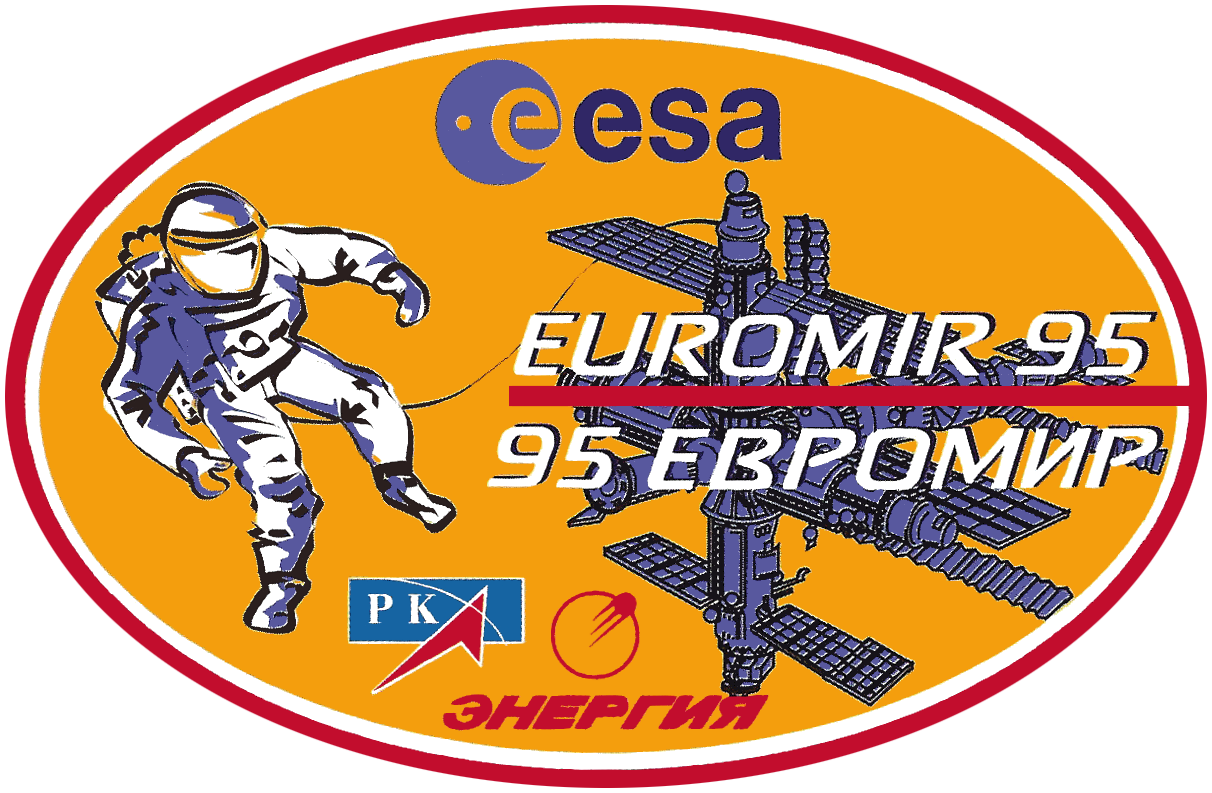
- Mission insignia
- Retired: September 30, 2007

Thomas Arthur Reiter (born 23 May 1958 in Frankfurt, West Germany) is a retired European astronaut and is a Brigadier General in the German Air Force currently working as ESA Interagency Coordinator and Advisor to the Director General at the European Space Agency (ESA). He was one of the top 25 astronauts in terms of total time in space. With his wife and two sons he lives near Oldenburg in Lower Saxony.

== Education ==
He graduated from Goethe-High School in Neu-Isenburg in 1977. In 1982, Reiter received his diploma in aerospace engineering from the University of the Bundeswehr Munich. In 2010, the university awarded him an honorary doctorate degree. He completed his training as a pilot in Germany and Texas.

== Astronaut career ==
He served as an onboard engineer for the Euromir 95/Soyuz TM-22 mission to the Mir space station. During his 179 days aboard Mir, he carried out two EVAs and became the first German astronaut to perform a spacewalk.

Between 1996 and 1997, he underwent additional training on the Soyuz spacecraft and was awarded a "Soyuz Return Commander" certificate, qualifying him to command a three-person Soyuz crew during its return from space.

He trained for a six-month mission to the International Space Station (ISS) and was selected for the Space Shuttle Discovery STS-121 mission to join Expedition 13. The launch was initially scheduled for 1 July 2006, but was due to weather delays eventually conducted on 4 July 2006. Discovery then departed on 15 July, leaving Reiter on the ISS continuing to work on Expedition 13. He later became part of Expedition 14 before returning to Earth, again aboard Discovery during the STS-116 mission. Reiter returned after 171 days in space, therefore having been in orbit twice, each time for almost half a year.

His ISS mission was designated Astrolab by the European Space Agency.

On 8 August 2007 Thomas Reiter was named a member of DLR's executive board.

From 1 April 2011 to December 2015 he was Director of Human Spaceflight and Operations at the European Space Agency (ESA), responsible for all crewed and uncrewed mission operations. This included the operation and exploitation of the European International Space Station elements, ESA's Automated Transfer Vehicle, the responsibility for the European Astronaut Centre, EAC, and ESA's uncrewed missions and ground-based mission infrastructure. Today he is working as ESA Interagency Coordinator and Advisor to the Director General.

== Honours and awards ==
- Order of Merit of the Federal Republic of Germany (2007)
- Bavarian Medal Europe (2008)
- Honorary doctorate of the Faculty of Aeronautics and Astronautics at the University of the Bundeswehr Munich (28 June 2010)
- Order of Friendship (Russia, 1996)
- Medal "For Merit in Space Exploration" (Russia, 12 April 2011) – for outstanding contribution to the development of international cooperation in crewed space flight
- Honorary membership in the Danish Astronautical Society
