= Boris Kondakov =

Russian philologist (born 1954)

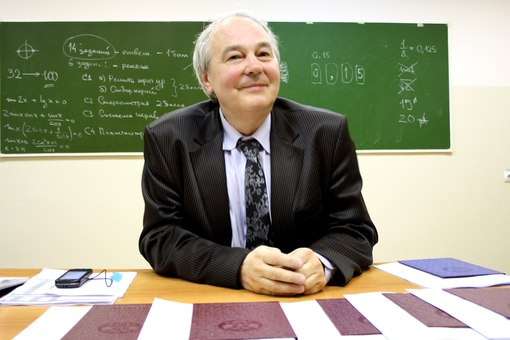
- Boris Kondakov
- Born: Boris Vadimovich Kondakov; March 29, 1954; Molotov, Russian SFSR, Soviet Union (now Perm, Russia)

Academic background
- Education: Perm State University (1976)
- Doctoral advisor: Piotr Alekseyevich Nikolaev

Academic work
- Main interests: Literary criticism, Philology
- Website: www.psu.ru/personalnye-stranitsy-prepodavatelej/k/boris-vadimovich-kondakov

Boris Vadimovich Kondakov (Russian: Бори́с Вади́мович Кондако́в, IPA: [bɐˈrʲis vɐˈdʲiməvʲɪtɕ kəndɐˈkof]; born March 29, 1954) is a Russian specialist in literary criticism, philologist, Doctor of Philology, head of Russian literature department, Dean of philological faculty at Perm State National Research University (since 1998). He is a grandson of Vadim Alexandrovich Kondakov (Вадим Александрович Кондаков), Professor of Perm State University, and a brother of Igor Vadimovich Kondakov (Игорь Вадимович Кондаков), a philosopher and culturologist. Also he is a leader of the school "Typological Regularities and Dialogue of Cultures in Russian Literature of the 19th to 21st Centuries".

== Sources ==
- Personal Page of B. Kondakov at Perm State National Research University's Official Page.
- Boris Kondakov's page at "Perm Culture Encyclopedia"
- List of B. Kondakov's publications in "Журнальный зал" online-magazine
