= Yelena Kondakova =

Russian cosmonaut (born 1957)

- Елена Кондакова
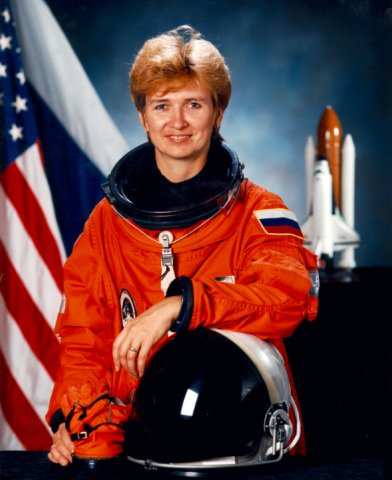
- Kondakova in 1997
- Born: 30 March 1957 (age 69); Mytishchi, Russian SFSR, Soviet Union
- Occupation: Politician
- Awards: Hero of the Russian Federation
- Space career

Roscosmos cosmonaut
- Status: Retired
- Time in space: 178d 10h 41 m
- Selection: 1989
- Missions: Soyuz TM-20, STS-84

Yelena Vladimirovna Kondakova (Russian: Елена Владимировна Кондакóва; born 30 March 1957) is the third Soviet or Russian female cosmonaut to travel to space and the first woman to make a long-duration spaceflight. Her first trip into space was on Soyuz TM-20 on 4 October 1994. She returned to Earth on 22 March 1995, after a five-month stay at the Mir space station. Kondakova's second flight was as a mission specialist on the United States Space Shuttle Atlantis during mission STS-84 in May 1997. She was the last Russian woman in space until her successor cosmonaut Elena Serova flew to the International Space Station (ISS) on 25 September 2014.

== Life and career ==
Kondakova was born in Mytishchi in the Moscow Oblast of Russia, but grew up near Kaliningrad, Moscow Oblast, with an older brother. In 1973 she graduated from high school in Kaliningrad. In 1980 she graduated from the Bauman Moscow State Technical University, where she specialized in production of aircraft. Kondakova's parents both worked at Energia, and her father was concerned about her taking on role as cosmonaut because he was well aware of the dangers involved. Since 1980, she worked as an engineer in the 113th department of NPO Energia (since 1994 - Rocket and Space Corporation Energia named after S.P. Korolev), where she was an employee of the Main Operational Control Group. She was engaged in the long-term planning of space flights and training personnel to work in emergencies, worked on implementing scientific projects and experiments, and carried out research. In 1982–1985, she was a member of the flight control group of the Salyut 7 space station.

She married fellow cosmonaut Valeri Ryumin in 1985 and has one daughter with him. In the same year, she began training and studying the Soyuz-TM spacecraft. She joined the USSR cosmonaut corps 1989.

Kondakova's first flight into space began on 4 October 1994 as a flight engineer on the Soyuz TM-20 expedition. She returned to Earth on 22 March 1995 after a 5-month flight on the Mir orbital station. Kondakova was the first woman to make a long flight into space.

During her first excursion into space, her husband Valery would often complain about how he desired a more traditional wife who would take care of the home and family. While Kondakova was away in space during this time, Energia appointed Ryumin to work from home and take care of his daughter until Kondakova's return.

In August 1996, Kondakova trained at the Johnson Space Center in Houston, United States.

Kondakova's second space flight was as a specialist on the American Space Shuttle Atlantis as part of the STS-84 expedition from 15 to 24 May 1997, under the program of the sixth docking with the Mir orbital station.

Kondakova retired from the cosmonaut corps of RSC Energia on 30 December 1999 due to her election as a deputy of the State Duma. From 1999 to 2003, she was a Deputy of the State Duma of the Russian Federation of the 3rd Convocation from the Fatherland - All Russia party. From 2003 to 2011, she was Deputy of the State Duma of the Russian Federation of the 4th and 5th convocations from the United Russia party. In 2006 she graduated from the Diplomatic Academy of the Ministry of Foreign Affairs of the Russian Federation.

On 16 August 2011, Kondakova announced her withdrawal from United Russia due to her disagreement with the results of the August intra-party elections.

People were given sheets with the numbers of people for whom it was necessary to vote; when counting the ballots, it turned out that there were more of them than people on the site.
United Russia's primaries are an economically inexpedient game of democracy.
I realize that my announcement means the end of my political career...

— Yelena Kondakova at a press conference, 16 August 2011

From 27 March 2012 to 2018, Kondakova was a Trade Representative of the Russian Federation in Switzerland.

== Space statistics ==
#	Launch ship	Start, UTC	Expedition	Landing ship	Landing, UTC	Time spent	Spacewalks	Time in outer space
1	Soyuz TM-20	03/10/1994, 22:42	Soyuz TM-20, Mir-17	Soyuz TM-20	22/03/1995, 04:03	169 days, 5 hours, 21 minutes	0	0
1	Space Shuttle Atlantis STS-84	15/05/1997, 08:07	Space Shuttle Atlantis STS-84, Mir	Space Shuttle Atlantis STS-84	24/05/1997, 13:27	9 days, 5 hours, 19 minutes	0	0
						178 days, 10 hours, 41 minutes	0	0

== Honors ==
- Hero of the Russian Federation

== See also ==
- List of female Heroes of the Russian Federation
- List of female astronauts
- Women in space
