= Roger Franzen (space engineer) =

Australian space engineer

Roger Franzen AO
- Born: Roger Leo Franzen; Australia
- Known for: Australian space engineering and advocacy
- Awards: Officer of the Order of Australia (AO)
- Scientific career
- Fields: Space engineering, systems engineering
- Institutions: Auspace; Earthspace; Australian National University; CSIRO
- Website: www.anu.edu.au/about/governance/committees/roger-franzen

Roger Leo Franzen is an Australian space engineer and consultant whose career has included senior roles in satellite communications, astronomical instrumentation, and Australia’s national space policy. He has worked in industry, academia, research organisations, and government‑aligned organisations, including Auspace, Earthspace, the Australian National University, and CSIRO. Franzen has contributed to major international projects including the Square Kilometre Array and the Giant Magellan Telescope, and he has participated in national discussions on Australia’s space engineering capability. In 2025, he was appointed an Officer of the Order of Australia.

== Early life and education ==
Franzen began his engineering career in Australia before relocating to the United Kingdom and Europe, where he worked on commercial and defence‑related space missions. He holds professional engineering qaccreditations including Chartered Professional Engineer (CPEng) and International Professional Engineer (IntPE).

== Career ==
Franzen spent the early part of his career contributing to European Space Agency and commercial space missions before returning to Australia in the mid-1980s, when he joined Auspace Limited, one of the country’s earliest space engineering firms. He served as managing director of Auspace from 1998 until 2006, overseeing national satellite and systems-engineering projects. In 2001, he was an inaugural member of the International Space Advisory Group, which was charged by the Parliamentary Secretary to the Minister for Industry, Science and Resources, Warren Entsch, to "identify opportunities for Australian involvement in... international space programs, and [to] assess the potential scientific and commercial benefits in pursuing such opportunities”.

In 2007, he left Auspace to found Earthspace, a space systems engineering consultancy providing technical advisory and project planning services to government, defence and commercial clients. While in that role, he served on the Interim Aerospace Council to establish the National Aerospace Centre in Canberra.

From 2010 to 2015, Franzen served in leadership roles at the Australian National University (ANU), where he was involved in managing advanced instrumentation and space technology development at Mount Stromlo Observatory, including as the Technical Program Manager of the ANU Research School of Astronomy and Astrophysics (RSAA) and roles related to their Advanced Instrumentation and Technology Centre that developed space instrumentation. He later led the Square Kilometre Array (SKA) International Dish Design Consortium for CSIRO’s astronomy and space science group, in charge of a multi-national consortium to design the SKA's dishes and receivers. The international SKA is the world's largest radio telescope project. At the ANU, he also held the position of Technical Program Manager at the Gant Magellan Telescope (GMT) Project Office, and managed operations of Australia’s 10% shareholding in the GMT. The GMT is an extremely large telescope which is under construction in Chile with a primary mirror diameter of 25.4 meters. His role included a term as a one of four Australian directors on the GMT Organisation’s board of directors.

Franzen has also been active in national and international space policy discussions. He was chair of Engineers Australia’s National Committee on Space Engineering and Chair of the Space Industry Association of Australia, advocating for the development of Australia’s space engineering workforce and capability. His advocacy work has been covered in independent industry publications such as SpaceConnectOnline, which documented his role in Australia’s space industry strategy at the International Astronautical Congress in Sydney.

He appeared as an expert witness in parliamentary inquiry proceedings on national space capability.

== Recognition and honours ==
In the 2025 King’s Birthday Honours, Franzen was appointed an Officer of the Order of Australia (AO) for “distinguished service to the space sector, to complex systems engineering, and to aerospace and satellite communications technology”, citing his contributions across multiple organisations and national space projects.

He was also recognised as an Honorary Fellow of Engineers Australia (HonFIEAust), the professional body’s highest grade of membership, in recognition of his contributions to space engineering in Australia.

== Selected publications ==
Although Franzen’s career has focused on engineering leadership and consultancy rather than formal academic authorship, he has contributed to technical and industry publications and conference proceedings, including:

- "Australian National University’s (ANU) Mt Stromlo Observatory – translating between astronomical instrumentation technologies and space systems applications via an integrated applications group", co-authored with Naomi Mathers and presented at the *63rd International Astronautical Congress* (2012).
- "STARS – Space Technology Astronomy Research Student Program", co-authored with Naomi Mathers et al., presented at the 65th International Astronautical Congress (2014).
- Policy and capability papers delivered via Engineers Australia’s National Committee on Space Engineering addressing national space engineering workforce and ecosystem challenges.

== See also ==
- Australian Space Agency
