= Larry Marshall =

Larry Marshall may refer to:

- Larry Marshall (singer) (1941–2017), Jamaican reggae musician
- Larry Marshall (actor) (born 1943), American actor and singer
- Larry Marshall (American football) (born 1950), American football player
- Larry R. Marshall, Australian venture capitalist, physicist and CEO of Commonwealth Scientific and Industrial Research Organisation (CSIRO)
