= Katherine Bennell-Pegg =

Astronaut and director at the Australian Space Agency

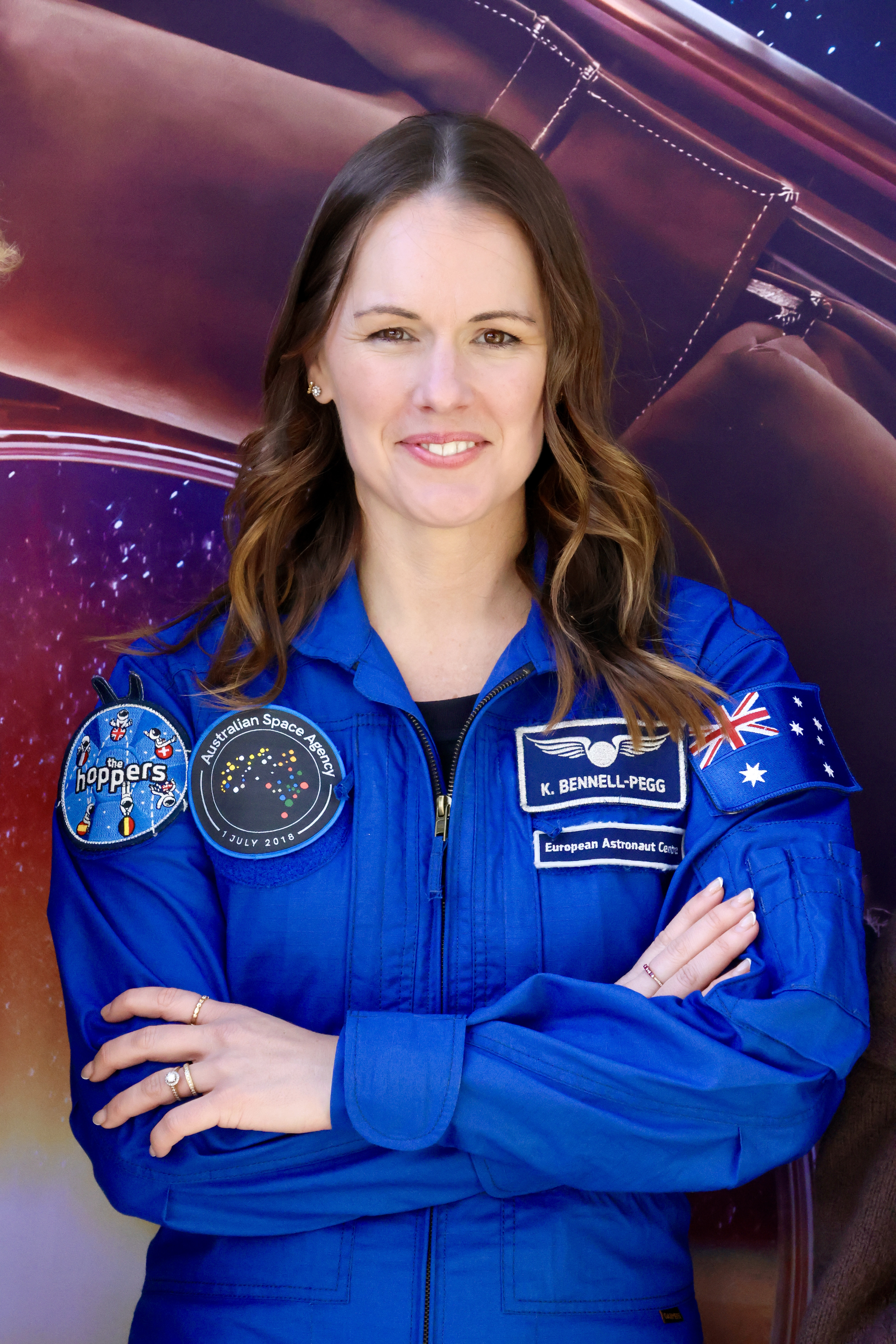
- Bennell-Pegg in 2026
- Born: Katherine Maureen Bennell; 15 December 1984 (age 41); Sydney, New South Wales, Australia
- Education: University of Sydney (BEng, BSc); Cranfield University (MSc); Luleå University of Technology (MSc)
- Occupations: Astronaut, space engineer, bureaucrat
- Space career

Australian Space Agency astronaut
- Rank: Group Captain, Royal Australian Air Force Reserve
- Selection: 2023 Australian Astronaut Group 1; 2022 ESA Group

Katherine Maureen Bennell-Pegg (born 15 December 1984) is an Australian space engineer and qualified astronaut, although she has not as yet flown in space. As of 2025 she is director of space technology at the Australian Space Agency, an Australian government agency. In 2024, she became the first qualified astronaut under the Australian flag as well as the first female Australian to be trained as an astronaut. In January 2026 she was named 2026 Australian of the Year.

== Early life and education ==
Katherine Bennell-Pegg was born on 15 December 1984 in Sydney and grew up in the Northern Beaches area. She attended Queenwood School for Girls in Mosman.

She completed a Bachelor of Engineering (Honours), Aeronautical & Space Engineering, and a Bachelor of Advanced Science majoring in physics at the University of Sydney, graduating in 2007. She received the Charles Kuller Graduation Prize for her undergraduate thesis.

Upon completion of her double degrees, Bennell-Pegg received an Erasmus Mundus full scholarship to study in Germany, Sweden, the United Kingdom, and the Netherlands as part of the Joint European Master in Space Science and Technology programme. Under this program, she completed a Masters of Science in Astronautics and Space Engineering at Cranfield University in England and a Masters of Science in Space Technology at Luleå University of Technology in Sweden, both in 2010.

During her university education, Bennell-Pegg also completed the Space Studies Program at the International Space University, from 29 June to 28 August 2009 (SSP09) at the NASA Ames Research Center. The 131 participants from 35 countries undertook three projects: ACCESS Mars: Assessing Cave Capabilities Establishing Specific Solutions; SAFEN EARTH: Space Aid for Energy Needs on Earth; and DREAM: Disaster Risk Evaluation and Management.

Bennell-Pegg also served in the Australian Army Reserve, for which she was awarded the Sword of Honour and the Sir Thomas Blamey Memorial Award.

== Career ==
Bennell-Pegg is a qualified professional astronaut and space engineer, although as of December 2025 has not been into space.

=== Airbus ===
Bennell-Pegg's first job after her MScs was as a mission systems engineer at Airbus UK and Airbus Defence and Space Germany, where she worked as a project manager, lead systems engineer, and service operations lead from 2014 to 2019. In her various roles at Airbus, she worked as a thermal architect on the LISA Pathfinder project; contributed to advanced ISRU (in-situ resource utilisation) technologies and a Martian vehicle design; developed an InSAR mission concept to measure ocean surface currents; and headed a team tasked with designing concepts for Orion missions.

=== Australian Space Agency ===
In 2019 Bennell-Pegg accepted a position as the assistant manager of space capability and robotics and automation at the Australian Space Agency based in Adelaide, South Australia. In March 2022 she was promoted to the role of director of space technology.

=== Australian training ===
As a British-Australian dual citizen, Bennell-Pegg applied to join the European Astronaut Corps in early 2021, in the first intake since 2009. She was one of the 25 finalists for the 2022 ESA Astronaut Group, but was not selected as part of the 17-person crew. However, the Australian Space Agency sponsored her training with the European Space Agency (ESA), announcing in March 2023 that she would train alongside the mission crew at the European Astronaut Centre (EAC) in Germany. This marked the first time ESA provided basic training to an astronaut candidate from an international partner, making the EAC the third centre in the world to do so. Bennell-Pegg was one of a class of six, selected from 225,000 applicants worldwide. She completed the ESA Basic Training curriculum and graduated with her ESA classmates from "The Hoppers" group on 22 April 2024 as a fully-qualified astronaut.

Bennell-Pegg became the first Australian woman to qualify as an astronaut, and the first person to train as an astronaut under the Australian flag. Previous Australian-born astronauts, Paul Scully-Power and Andy Thomas, flew to space as US citizens representing NASA. UK-born Australian citizen Meganne Christian was also selected as a member of the 2022 ESA astronaut reserve, representing the UK Space Agency.

=== Royal Australian Air Force ===
On 5 December 2024, Bennell-Pegg was appointed as a reservist group captain in the Royal Australian Air Force in the role of a specialist capability officer in the Air Force Reserve. Her duties include instructing and informing colleagues about human performance optimisation, space capabilities and technologies, and how to build the necessary resilience for a resourceful, ready and inclusive workforce.

=== Awaiting space flight ===
As of October 2026, the Australian government was in negotiations to secure a seat for Bennell-Pegg on ESA's EPIC one month mission to the International Space Station in early 2028. The cost of participation was estimated to exceed A$100 million, with the government seeking financial contributions from state governments and private donors. The proposal drew criticism from some Australian officials over its cost amid competing budget priorities.

== Other activities and roles ==
In November 2009 it was announced that Bennell-Pegg, future husband Campbell Pegg, and a third student had conceived and developed the idea for a reality TV series named Starwalker, which would select and train two amateur astronauts. Jonathan Nolan, a disbarred attorney, was listed as showrunner and executive producer. The press release mentioned the participation of physicist Stephen Hawking, but a representative for Hawking later denied any involvement. The three students left the project a few weeks after the announcement, and it was continued by Nolan. The couple issued a statement saying that they had presented their idea to Greg Smith, who had brought in Nolan, but they had disassociated themselves from the project on 7 December 2009 and had received no financial benefit from it. The project later collapsed amid claims of financial mismanagement.

In 2022, Bennell-Pegg delivered The Warren Centre for Advanced Engineering Innovation Lecture.

She is a delegate of the American-Australian Leadership Dialogue, and mentors junior space engineers regularly. She engages with school students to inspire them to study STEM subjects, as well as talking to industry leaders and community groups to advocate for the growing Australian space industry.

== Recognition and awards ==
- 2020: Selected as a member fellow of The Karman Project, a global one-year program for leaders in the space industry
- 2023: Presented with an RAAF uniform by Defence Space Commander air vice-marshal Catherine Roberts in Berlin
- 2023: Overall winner in addition to the winner of the Leader of the Year category at the Woman of the Year Awards in Adelaide
- 2024: SA Life Person of the Year 2024
- 2024: University of Sydney International Alumni Achievement Award
- 2024: Lulea Institute of Technology Alumnus of the Year
- 2024: Doctor of Engineering (Honoris Causa) from the University of Southern Queensland
- November 2025: Named South Australia's Australian of the Year for 2026
- January 2026: named Australian of the Year for 2026

== Personal life ==
Bennell-Pegg has volunteered with SA Surf Life Saving, NSW State Emergency Service, and Engineers Without Borders Australia. She has enjoyed hobbies such as scuba diving, flying, surfing, basketball, sports coaching, tennis, reading, hiking, and cycling.

Bennell-Pegg married spacecraft systems engineer Campbell Pegg, a fellow graduate of the University of Sydney. As of August 2025 she lives in the Adelaide suburb of West Beach, with her husband and two children.
