= SHIFT Business Festival =

- Genre: Technology, business festival
- Venue: Turku Castle, Turku
- Country: Finland
- Years active: Since 2016
- Website: www.theshift.fi

SHIFT is a two-day international business festival held every year in Turku, Finland, at the Turku Castle. It was first held on May 31 and June 1, 2016. The attendees included over 1,000 visitors, 80 partner companies, 150 startups, and over 20 investors. Around 100 volunteers were part of this event. SHIFT 2017 is slated to be held on May 31 and June 1, 2017.

The SHIFT is backed by companies and the city of Turku, as well as Turku Chamber of Commerce and The Federation of Finnish Enterprises, while the event itself is put together by local JCI members, start-up actives and students.

== 2016 - First Year ==
The 2016 SHIFT business festival had key speakers such as:

- Edward Jung, Founder and Chief Technology Officer, Intellectual Ventures
- Andreas Korczak, Microsoft
- Cecilia Hertz, Founder of Umbilical Design
- Thor Gunnarsson, co-founder, Solfar
- Jonathan Pulitzer, managing director in the energy practice, GE Ventures
- Stephen Lake, CEO, Thalmic Labs
- Mo-El Fatatry, Founder, Masar
- Ravi Belani, Founder, Alchemist Accelerator
- Henrietta Kekäläinen, Founder, Mehackit
- Markus Alholm, CEO, GE Energy Finland
- Oliver Rittgen, CEO, Bayer Nordic SE
- Keiichi Matsuda, Augmented reality designer
- Teemu Arina, Founder, Biohacker Center
- Aape Pohjavirta, Founder, Funzi
- Kristoffer Lawson, Founder, Solu
- Jussi Westergren, co-founder, Virunga Alliance

The business festival also featured performing artists such as:

- Kalle Lehto, Circus performer
- Kimmo Korpela, Breakdance champion
- Anu Halmesmaa, Sculptor
- Alessio de Marchi, Metallurgy sculptor
- Sampo Kurppa, Circus artist
- Masha Sha, Video artist
- Celia Eid and Sebastian Bérangér, Animator and Composers
- Albert Bayona, Visual artist and Cultural promoter
- Alper T İnce, Painter and Video artist
- Inna Demidova-Tuomikoski, Visual artist
- Silja Selonen, Painter and Sculptor
- Zinaïda Lihacheva, Artist
- The Turncoats, Jugglers

== 2017 Lineup ==
The event is scheduled to be held in the Turku Castle, in Turku, Finland, on May 31, 2017, and June 1, 2017.

Neil Harbisson, the avant-garde artist and cyborg activist, was announced as first of the speakers in the event. The other speakers are:

- Alan Laubsch, Founder, National Capital Alliance
- Gerd Leonhard, Author, CEO of the Futures Agency
- Melody Hossaini, Founder and CEO, InspirEngage International
- Lauri Järvilehto, CEO and co-founder, Lightneer; Founder, Filosofian Akatemia
- Cecilia Tham, Entrepreneur, MOB and FabCafe
- Christopher Auel-Welsbach, Founder, Product Manager, Speaker on Artificial Intelligence, Leader of IBM Watson Partner Innovation (Europe)
- Hugh Williams, VP Engineering, Google
- Laila Pawlak, CEO and co-founder, SingularityU Denmark
- Henrik Hautop Lund, Professor, Technical University of Denmark
