= Spaarc =

Spaarc may refer to:

- the South Plains Alcohol and Addiction Research Center (SPAARC) at the Texas Tech University Health Sciences Center
- the Fugro SpAARC Space Automation AI and Robotics Control facility in Western Australia
