= EPIC (spaceflight) =

Planned crewed spaceflight mission

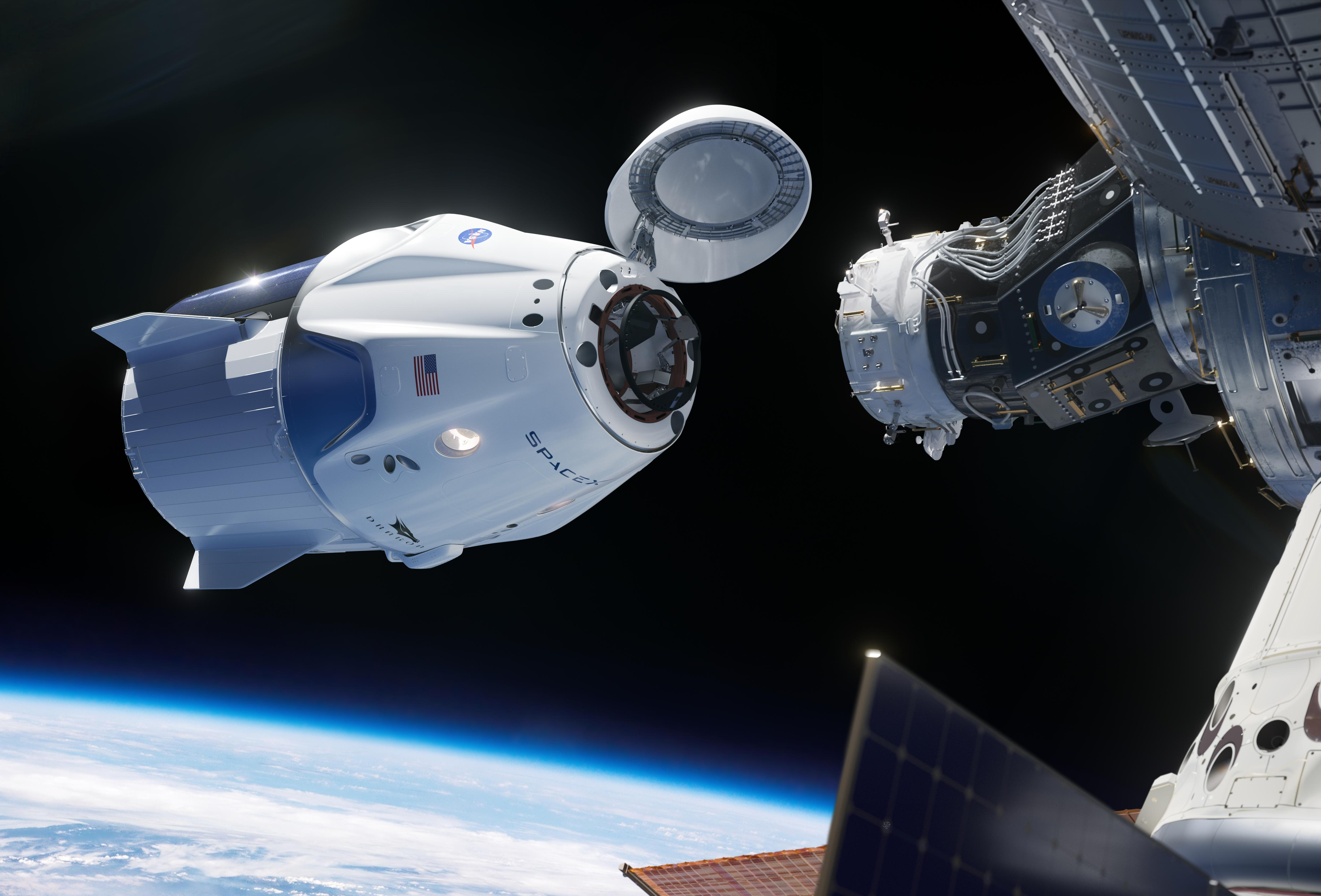
- Artists' impression of a Crew Dragon approaching the forward port of Harmony on the ISS.
- Mission type: Private spaceflight to the ISS
- Operator: SpaceX

Spacecraft properties
- Spacecraft type: Crew Dragon
- Manufacturer: SpaceX

Crew
- Crew size: 4
- Members: TBA; TBA; TBA; TBA

Start of mission
- Launch date: NET 2028
- Rocket: Falcon 9 Block 5
- Contractor: SpaceX

Orbital parameters
- Reference system: Geocentric orbit
- Regime: Low Earth orbit

Docking with ISS

EPIC (ESA Provided Institutional Crew) is a planned crewed spaceflight mission of the European Space Agency (ESA) to the International Space Station (ISS). Scheduled for early 2028, it will fly aboard a Crew Dragon spacecraft provided by SpaceX. The crew will consist of a ESA career astronaut commander who has previously flown to the ISS and three astronauts from ESA or partner agencies. The mission is intended to give ESA experience in leading a crewed flight to the station while conducting scientific research and continuing European participation in its operations. Unlike private astronaut missions, EPIC is planned to have a longer one month duration and involve its crew in station maintenance activities as well as scientific experiments.

== Background ==
The EPIC project was approved by the ESA Council at the conclusion of its 345th meeting on 19 March 2026. Following the endorsement of the mission concept at the 345th Council meeting, the ESA Council at its 347th meeting, held in Paris on 16–17 June 2026, agreed that ESA may enter into negotiations with potential partners and providers for the mission. According to ESA Director General Josef Aschbacher, the mission aims to provide more flight opportunities to European astronauts during the final years of ISS operations, whose retirement is planned around 2030.

ESA intended that all five of the 'career astronauts' from their 2022 selection go to the ISS. However, prior to EPIC's announcement, ESA only secured seats for two: Sophie Adenot on Crew-12 and Raphaël Liégeois on a future SpaceX crew mission. ESA also stated that it was open to non-ESA astronauts on the mission, meaning the crew is likely the three remaining ESA 2022 astronauts, Marco Sieber, Pablo Álvarez Fernández, and Rosemary Coogan, and a non-ESA astronaut. ESA also stated that EPIC is intended as a flight opportunity to supplement the long-duration missions already planned or under consideration for these astronauts.

As of October 2026, the Australian government was in negotiations to secure a seat for Katherine Bennell-Pegg on the mission. The cost of participation was estimated to exceed A$100 million, with the government seeking financial contributions from state governments and private donors. The proposal drew criticism from some Australian officials over its cost amid competing budget priorities. Its supporters, however, argued that the deal to send Bennell-Pegg to the ISS on EPIC is being pursued in parallel with an agreement with the ESA to secure future Australian astronauts and payloads either on the proposed European Space Station or a commercial one to boost Australia's near non-existent presence in space.

== Mission ==
EPIC will consist of the ESA chartering a dedicated Crew Dragon mission to the ISS in early 2028. The crew will consist of four people, comprising ESA astronauts and possibly non-European international partners. The mission is expected to last approximately one month, significantly longer than typical private astronaut missions to the ISS, which usually last about two weeks. It will be carried out in "close cooperation" with NASA, while being directed and operated by the ESA. ESA has not yet announced the crew composition or the anticipated cost of the mission.

== See also ==
- List of European Space Agency programmes and missions
