= SpaceMaster =

Spacemaster or Space Master may refer to:

- Joint European Master in Space Science and Technology or short SpaceMaster, an Erasmus Mundus programme in Europe
- Martin Marietta Spacemaster, Space Shuttle proposal
- Space Master, Italian electro-musical group of the 1990s
- Spacemaster, science fiction role-playing game
- Trusty Spacemaster, a small wheeled bicycle made by Trusty Manufacturing in the 1960s and 1970s
- Zeiss SpaceMaster, a planetarium projector
