= Saber Astronautics =

Australian and American space technology company

- Type: Private
- Industry: Space technology
- Founded: 2008; 18 years ago
- Founders: Dr Jason Held
- Headquarters: USA and Australia
- Services: Space Flight Operations Facility, space domain awareness, spaceflight mission planning, space operations software
- Website: saberastro.com

Saber Astronautics is a space operations and software company based in Sydney and Adelaide in Australia, and Boulder, Colorado in the United States.

== Company structure ==
Saber Astronautics consists of two separately incorporated entities – Saber Astronautics, LLC in the US and Saber Astronautics Australia Pty Ltd in Australia.

The Australian business has a headquarters in Chippendale, New South Wales. The US business has a headquarters in Boulder, Colorado.

== History ==
Saber Astronautics was first established in 2007 as a research and development startup in Boulder, Colorado, and in 2008, in Sydney, New South Wales with a mission to reduce barriers to spaceflight and the "democratisation of space".

The company initially developed machine learning diagnostics software for satellites in 2010 with a focus area on system of systems, and conducted spacecraft design on contract. The machine learning diagnostics tools were demonstrated on the NASA Advanced Composition Explorer space weather satellite in 2012.

Saber entered the space operations software market in 2012 with the Predictive Ground station InterfaceTM (PIGI) in 2012. PIGI was first used in live operations in 2014 for the California-based cubesat startup Southern Stars' SkyCube mission in 2014.

In 2013 Saber was accepted into NASA's Flight Opportunities Program for an Electrodynamic Deorbit Tether to deorbit cubesats. The tether completed parabolic flight tests in 2015 and 2016.

Since 2017 the company has supplied the United States Space Force with the Space Cockpit software. It provided civilian space operators as part of the JCO Pacific in 2020. Between 2020 and 2022 the company led the Sprint Advanced Concepts Training (SACT) wargames for the Pacific timezone. In 2023 the New Zealand Defence Force was selected to take over lead.

In 2020 the company won an Australian Space Agency’s Space Infrastructure Fund (SIF) grant to construct an operations center in Adelaide. In 2022, the company opened this new office, operations centre and concurrent design facility on Lot 14 in Adelaide in proximity to the Australian Space Agency (ASA).

On 4 March 2026, Saber Astronautics opened a research and development facility in Chippendale, Sydney.

In April 2026, the company announced the deployment of WINDU, an AI-enabled system for automating space domain awareness workflows. WINDU had initially received US$1.2 million in funding from the United States Space Force in 2025 and had been integrated into Saber's Space Cockpit Battle Management System platform.

That same month, Saber Astronautics announced a live demonstration of a satellite jamming capability using its SBMS Singularity platform during the Space Symposium in the United States, which was conducted with the release of the battle.space website. The demonstration, conducted on 16 April in a controlled environment using authorised satellite services, involved real-time electromagnetic effects against a satellite link. The company said the Singularity platform extended its Space Battle Management System by allowing operators to coordinate multiple mission effects, including electronic warfare actions such as jamming, through a unified software interface.

== Notable achievements ==
In 2010 the company, in partnership with the 4 Pines Brewing Company, worked on developing the first space-drinkable beer. The project was funded by a crowdsourcing campaign that failed to achieve its goal investment. The project was continued through internal funding, and has conducted parabolic flight tests every few years. The 'Nitro Stout' beer is sold by 4 Pines in a regular bottle.

In 2016 the company founder, Dr Jason Held, was assigned to lead a taskforce to advocate for an Australian space agency. The taskforce delivered its report in late 2017. In 2018, Held was assigned to the government-appointed "Expert Reference Group" to design the Australian Space Agency which was founded in 2019. He remains a member of the ASA Space Industry Leaders Forum, which informs the agency on issues relevant to the industry and civil space sector.

Since 2020 the company has been a partner of the US Joint Task Force-Space Defense Commercial Operations Cell (JCO) Pacific.

In 2022 the company won a contract to conduct the launch tracking and in-orbit operations for the AST SpaceMobile BlueWalker 3 satellite. This satellite is a prototype for space to ground mobile phone service. Saber continues to fly AST through their Block-1 and Block 2 missions.

== Products ==
=== Software ===
- Saber Commander (rebranded from the Predictive Ground station Interface) – satellite command and control
- Space Cockpit Battle Management System (SBMS) – defence-focused satellite command and control
- Mission Management Board (MMB) – a space operator–focused tasking board
- YodaML - machine learning fault detection software for satellites

=== Services ===
- Commercial spaceflight operations
- Space domain awareness services and advice

=== Facilities ===
- Responsive Space Operations Centre, Adelaide, Australia
- Responsive Space Operations Center, Boulder Colorado, USA (also US HQ)
- Development R&D Headquarters, Sydney Australia (also Australian HQ)
