= Enrico Palermo =

Australian mechanical engineer and businessman

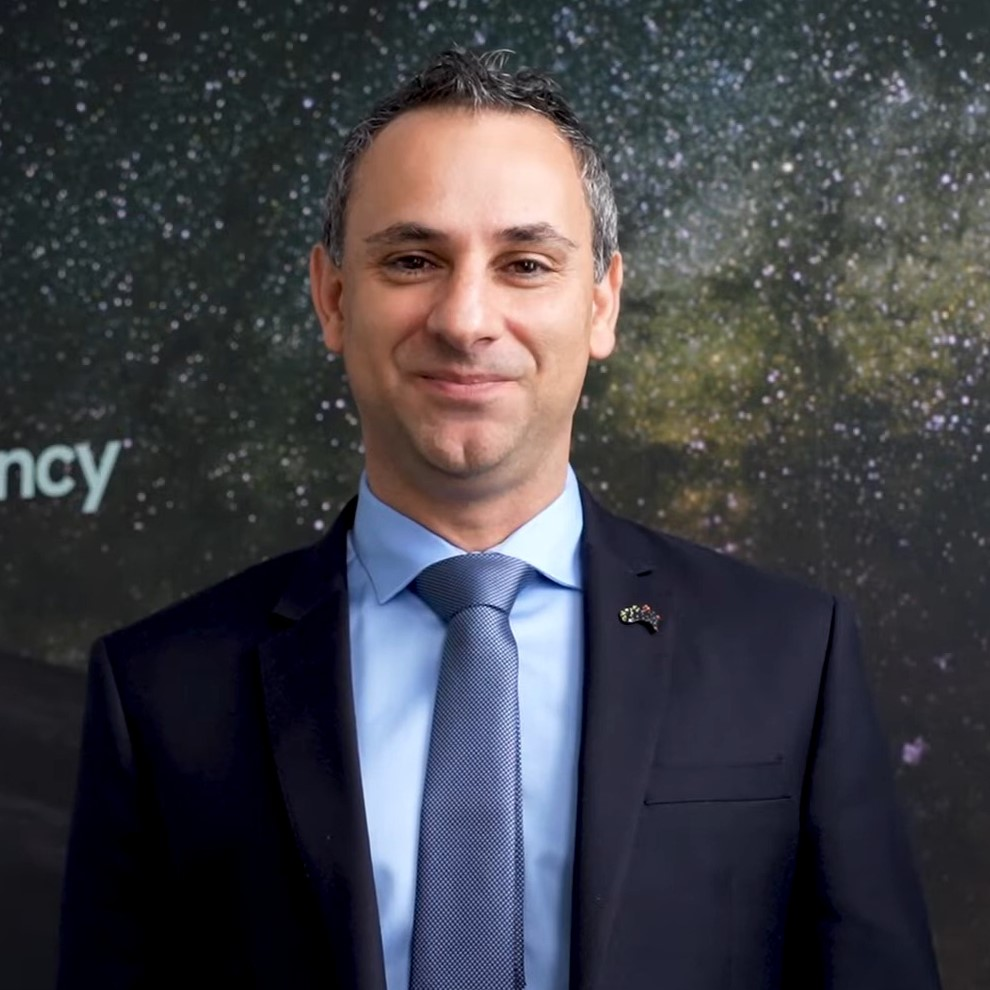
- Palermo in 2023

Head of the Australian Space Agency
- Incumbent
- Assumed office 28 January 2021
- Preceded by: Megan Clark

Personal details
- Spouse: Nadia Palermo
- Education: University of Western Australia
- Occupation: Mechanical engineer and businessman in aeronautics, VSS Unity and space tourism
- Awards: Clough scholarship

Enrico Palermo is an Australian mechanical engineer, businessman and the Head of the Australian Space Agency. He was the former President of The Spaceship Company, which develops and manufactures spaceplanes for Virgin Galactic, and the former Chief Operating Officer at Virgin Galactic, whose VSS Unity was the world's first passenger spaceplane.

== Education ==
Palermo holds two degrees from the University of Western Australia (UWA): a BEng in mechanical engineering (2002) and a BSc in physics and applied mathematics (2000). At UWA he was a Clough scholar and a member of the university's Cooperative Education for Enterprise Development (CEED) Program, for which he completed a thesis in mine planning for Rio Tinto.

He won a scholarship to the Space Studies Program at the International Space University, Strasbourg, France, graduating in 2006.

== Business career ==
After graduation Palermo worked for Woodside Energy as a mechanical engineer. In 2005, he became a business analyst at a UK-based engineering firm, where he specialised in composite materials. He joined Virgin Galactic as an operations executive in 2006, becoming one of the firm's first ten full-time employees. He was the technical liaison between Virgin Galactic and its then-partner Scaled Composites. He also drafted the business plan that established The Spaceship Company and became that firm's first employee.

Palermo was General Manager of The Spaceship Company between 2016 and 2018, and its president from 2018 to 2020. He joined Virgin Galactic as its Chief Operating Officer in 2020. He was also involved in Virgin Galactic's high-mach, sub-hypersonic commercial winged vehicle projects.

In 2019, Palermo and Richard Branson donated to the Smithsonian Museum the engine used in the VSS Unity's first spaceflight.

On 13 November 2020, the Australian Prime Minister Scott Morrison announced that Palermo would lead the Australian Space Agency from January 2021, replacing inaugural Head Dr. Megan Clark.

== Personal life ==
Palermo was born in Perth, Australia. He lives in Adelaide, Australia with his wife Nadia, whom he met studying at Chisholm Catholic College. The couple has two children.

At university Palermo became involved with Formula SAE, a student design competition to develop a Formula-style racing car. Palermo started off working on the car's electrics and engine before taking part as a driver in the competition's 2001 season.

He has twice been a finalist judge for Google's Science Fairs. In 2014 he was invited to deliver the Warren Centre Innovation Lecture, Beyond Earth.
