= Geoff Garrett =

Australian scientist (born 1948)

Geoff Garrett AO FTSE FAICD
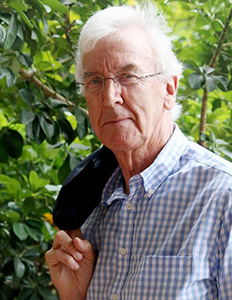
- Garrett circa 2016

Chief Executive of the CSIRO
- In office 15 January 2001 – 31 December 2008
- Preceded by: Colin Adam
- Succeeded by: Megan Clark

Personal details
- Born: 1948 (age 77–78)
- Education: Cambridge University
- Occupation: Metallurgist and researcher

Geoffrey Graham Garrett (born 1948) is an Australian metallurgist. He the former CEO of the Commonwealth Scientific and Industrial Research Organisation (CSIRO) and was Queensland Chief Scientist 2011–2016.

== Education and work ==
Garrett earned a doctorate from Cambridge University, where he studied metallurgy. He went on to hold academic positions at the University of Cape Town and the University of the Witwatersrand (where he established the Fracture Research Group), and visiting positions at Brown University, Oxford University and Sheffield University.

He worked in various management roles at the South African Council for Scientific and Industrial Research (CSIR) for almost a decade, supplementing the experience by attending business programs at Stanford University in 1991, before he was appointed President and Chief Executive in 1995. His five year tenure saw a 35% increase in government funding and a 61% increase in external funding, the latter eventually making up 58.4% of CSIR's income, while its spending on research and infrastructure increased 41%. Garrett also oversaw efforts to increase the number of black professional staff members, resulting in an increase from 5% to 22%.

As CSIRO chief executive 2001-2008, starting in 2003 Garrett introduced changes to the management structure which were intended to increase the impact of science research aimed at major industrial, governmental and community problems, and implemented "flagships" in order to increase revenue. He called it "one of the largest targeted scientific research programs in Australia's history". His policies generated both approval and criticism.

In 2008 he participated in the Australia 2020 Summit. He went on to chair the Great Barrier Reef water science taskforce in 2016, which reported on ways of reducing industrial pollution in the area of the reef. He said that if water quality continued to deteriorate, "we’re stuffed with a capital S", and expressed concern that insufficient funds had been assigned to meet water quality targets within the time proposed. He continues to provide support to the Great Barrier Reef Foundation as a member of their Partnership Management Committee.

Garrett was Queensland's Chief Scientist 2011-2016. The Queensland premier called the appointment "a fantastic coup for science and innovation in Queensland".

== Awards and recognition ==
The South African Society of Professional Engineers named Garrett Engineer of the Year in 1999. He received the Centenary Medal in 2001 and, in June 2008, was appointed as an Officer of the Order of Australia in the Queen’s Birthday Honours list in recognition of his work at CSIRO.

He is an Honorary Fellow of the Institution of Engineers Australia and a Fellow of the Australian Academy of Technology and Engineering.

== Publications ==
In 2010, Garrett and his co-author Graeme Davies, with a group of co-contributors, published Herding Cats: Being Advice to Aspiring Academic and Research Leaders, described as a "non-ideological, aphoristic little book" about managing academics and researchers. He has also written at least 48 scientific papers and edited books on metals fracture analysis and materials engineering.

== Personal life ==
Garrett is married, with 4 children and 5 grandchildren.
