= GE Ventures =

Venture capital subsidiary of General Electric

- Industry: Venture capital
- Founded: 2013; 13 years ago
- Defunct: 2020
- Headquarters: Menlo Park, California,
- Key people: Sue Siegel (CEO)
- Website: www.geventures.com

GE Ventures (founded in 2013) was the venture capital subsidiary of General Electric. Headquartered in Menlo Park, California, the firm also had offices in Boston, Chicago, Houston, Shanghai, and Tel Aviv. As of 2015, the CEO was Sue Siegel, and on October 23, 2017, she was also named chief innovation officer. GE Ventures planned to invest up to $150 million annually in startups (or corporate collaborations) in the healthcare, energy, software, and advanced manufacturing sectors.

The firm had 75 companies in its portfolio, including Clearpath Robotics, HourlyNerd, Mocana, Nanosonics, Enbala, and Airware. In March 2015, GE Ventures led a Series A investment in Evidation Health, a healthcare technology company formerly known as The Activity Exchange that is involved in data analytics. In December 2016, GE Ventures launched Menlo Microsystems, Inc., a spinoff from GE's Global Research Center, which creates "digital micro switches" used in mobile communication networks.

The company was dissolved in 2020.

== See also ==
- List of venture capital firms
