= Flavia Tata Nardini =

Italian aerospace engineer, entrepreneur

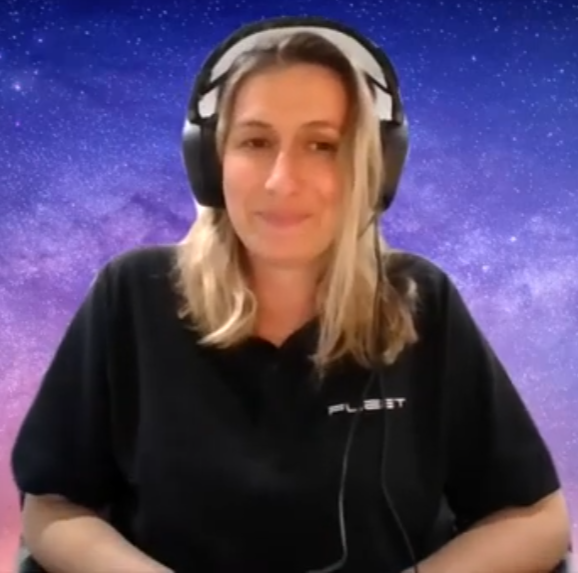
- In an online discussion in 2020
- Born: Rome, Italy
- Education: Sapienza University of Rome
- Occupation(s): Aerospace engineer, entrepreneur

Flavia Tata Nardini is an Italian aerospace engineer, entrepreneur, and the co-founder and chief executive officer of Fleet Space Technologies, based in South Australia. Born in Rome, she completed her Master's in aerospace engineering, and began her career in rocket propulsion at the European Space Agency. After relocating to Adelaide, Tata Nardini co-founded Fleet Space Technologies where she led the development and launch of Australia's first low-Earth orbit (LEO) nanosatellite constellation. She also chairs the Australian Space Agency's Space Industry Leaders Forum and is a director on the board of Austmine, an industry association representing Australia's mining equipment, technology, and services sector.

== Early life and education ==
Flavia Tata Nardini was born in Rome, Italy. She studied aerospace engineering at Sapienza University of Rome, where she completed a master's degree in the field.

In 2025 she graduated from the Australian Institute of Company Directors' Corporate Program.

== Career ==
Tata Nardini's early career focused on rocket propulsion technology at the European Space Agency (ESA). She also worked at the Netherlands Organisation for Applied Scientific Research (TNO), contributing to micro propulsion systems and deorbit motors.

Moving to Adelaide, South Australia, in 2014, Tata Nardini co-founded the company Fleet Space Technologies and developed educational software for children to 3D print nanosatellites and launch them. She also led the development and launch or Australia's first low-Earth-orbit (LEO) nanosatellite constellation.

Tata Nardini worked for a number of years on the CubeSat research project at University of Adelaide, where their miniaturised satellite was launched by NASA and deployed from the International Space Station.

She then moved on to developing the concept and commercial model for a global Internet of Things (IoT) nanosatellite network. The first four nanosatellites were launched in 2015, with further expansion during 2021-2023 on board SpaceX Transporter-5. Tata Nardini has identified practical applications for a range of industries, including improvements in the ability to identify minerals and deposits for mining, as well as working on defence capabilities in space.

In 2024, Fleet Space raised AU$150 million in a Series D funding round, achieving a valuation of approximately AU$800 million. The company uses its ExoSphere platform, combining nanosatellites, ground-based seismic sensors, and AI, to create high-resolution 3D subsurface imaging for mineral exploration.

== Other roles and activities ==
=== Industry leadership ===
Tata Nardini serves as chair of the Australian Space Agency's Space Industry Leaders Forum, and is a non-executive director on the board of Austmine, representing over 700 companies in Australia's mining equipment, technology, and services (METS) sector.

She was mission chair for the Seven Sisters lunar exploration mission, set to be Australia's first mission to the Moon, and a companion mission to NASA's Artemis program. Run by a consortium that included Australian space, remote operations, and resource exploration companies and research centres, headed by Fleet Space, its aim was to send nanosatellites and sensors to the Moon to search for accessible water and resources. However, that project seems to have been quietly shelved, although no public announcement has been made. (Note: Fleet Space is now working on a different, international mission to the far side of the Moon, with its SPIDER seismic technology set to be carried aboard American space company Firefly Aerospace's Blue Ghost as part of its second mission to the moon in 2026. The Blue Ghost will also carry payloads from NASA and the European Space Agency as part of NASA's Commercial Lunar Payload Services (CLPS) program.)

As of 2025 she is vice-chair of AmCham SA Council of Governors, and adjunct professor at the University of South Australia.

=== Others ===
Tata Nardini was the lead speaker at the International Women's Day luncheon in Adelaide in 2024. In July 2025, she led a panel discussion at the 18th Australian Space Forum, titled "Funding Space Business". She is also a regular speaker at other events, and advocates for women in STEM.

== Research and patents ==
Tata Nardini's research has focused on the combination of rocket propulsion, nanotechnology, re-usable rocket technology and ambient noise tomography (ANT).

She is co-inventor on at least two U.S. patent applications related to nanosatellite and geophysical technologies:

- Seismic data acquisition unit, method, and system employing the same (US 20240248225), which describes a geophone-based unit for detecting seismic signals.
- Remote LPWAN gateway with backhaul over a high-latency communication system (US 20230254943), which details a terrestrial gateway device enabling LPWAN communication through nanosatellite backhaul.

== Recognition and awards ==
In 2023, Fleet Space Technologies was listed as Australia's fastest-growing company by the Australian Financial Review, after it had had a compound annual growth rate of 582 per cent over three years.

Tata Nardini has also been recognised in the following ways:

- 2020: First Among Equals Award in South Australia's 40 Under 40
- 2022: South Australian Pearcey Award for Entrepreneur of the Year
- 2023: Australian Space Awards – Female Space Leader of the Year
- 2023: Australian Space Awards – Excellence Award
- 2025: SkyCity Woman of the Year Awards – Top Innovator
- 2025: Visionary Women's Award – Excellence in Engineering, presented at the Vogue Codes Summit in Sydney
