= Australian Space Board =

Agency overview
- Formed: 1986
- Dissolved: 1994
- Superseding agency: Australian Space Council
- Jurisdiction: Commonwealth of Australia
- Agency executive: Robert Somervaille, Chairman
- Parent department: Department of Industry, Technology and Commerce

The Australian Space Board was a board that made up part of the Australian National Space Program initiative from 1986 until it was superseded by the Australian Space Council in 1994.

The board's role was to advise the Minister for Industry, Technology and Commerce on the National Space Program.

The board was made up of five members appointed by the minister, with the Australian Space Office being an ex-officio member. Later the CSIRO Office of Space Science and Applications also became a member.

== See also ==
- National Space Program
