= Chisholm Catholic College, Perth =

School in Bedford, Western Australia

Chisholm Catholic College
- Crest of Chisholm Catholic College

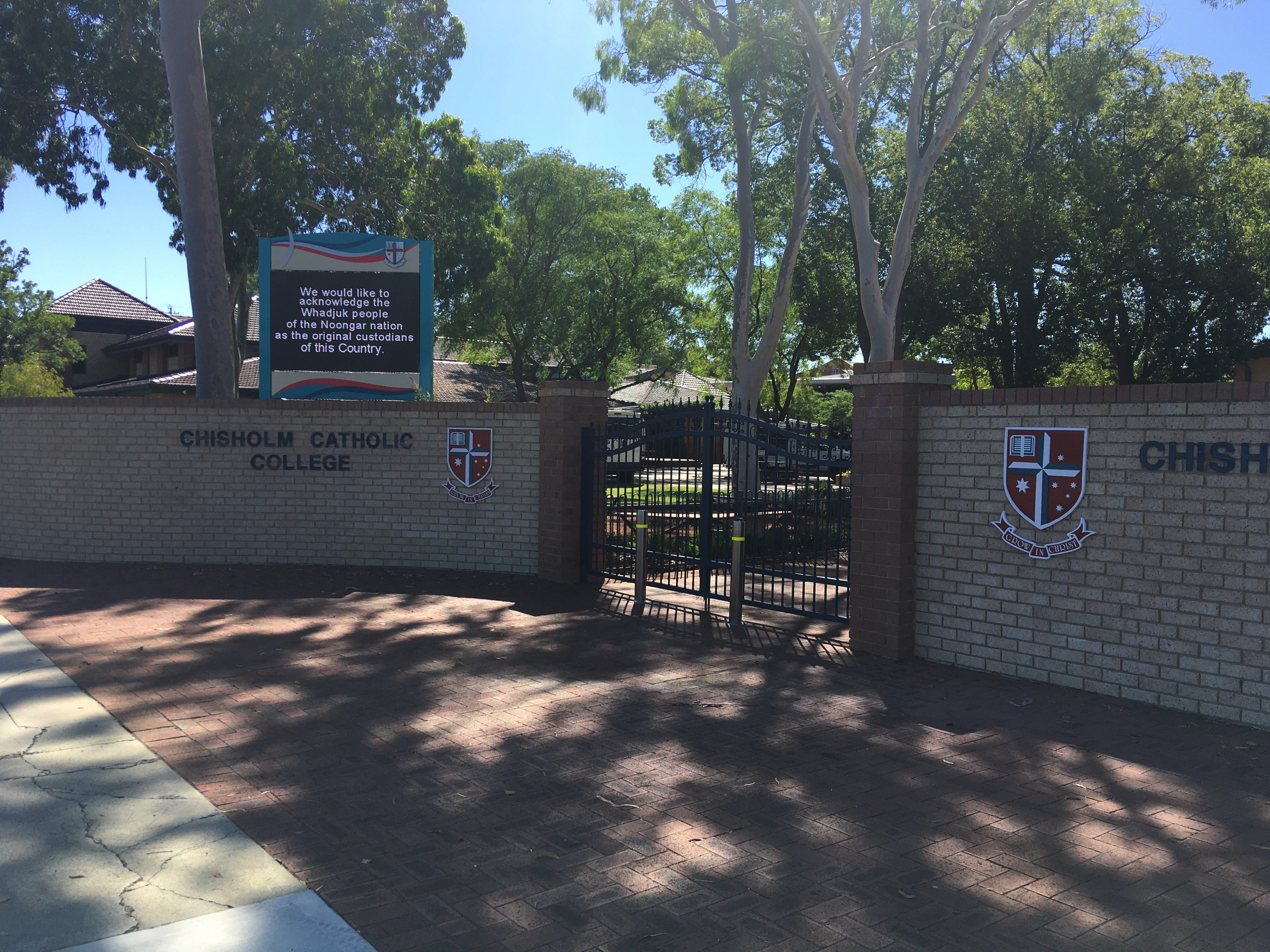
- Chisholm Catholic College main entrance

Location
- Bedford, Western Australia; Australia; 31°54′41″S 115°54′01″E

Information
- Type: Secondary School
- Motto: Grow in Christ
- Denomination: Catholic
- Established: 1989; 37 years ago
- Principal: Simon Harvey
- Years offered: 7–12
- Enrolment: 1700
- Colours: Teal, red, white
- Athletics: • Northern Associated Schools (NAS) • Associated and Catholic Colleges (ACC)
- Website: www.chisholm.wa.edu.au

Chisholm Catholic College is a private Roman Catholic high school situated approximately 6 kilometres (3.7 mi) northeast of the Central Business District of Perth, Western Australia in the suburb of Bedford. The College provides education for approximately 2,021 students.

Chisholm Catholic College was established in 1989 as a result of the amalgamation of St Mark's College, Bedford, conducted by the Christian Brothers, and St Thomas Aquinas College, Inglewood, conducted by the Dominican Sisters. From 1989 to 2002, the College had two campuses. The senior students were taught at the original St Thomas Aquinas College site in Wood Street and the junior students were taught at the St Mark's college site in Beaufort Street. In 2003 the College merged onto one site at Beaufort Street

The College is owned by the Catholic Archdiocese of Perth in the person of the Archbishop of Perth. With the other Western Australian Bishops, he has authorised the Catholic Education Commission to determine major policy and to appoint a College Board responsible for the financial administration. The Principal, also appointed by the Archbishop, is accountable to the Director of Catholic Education for the educational administration of the College.

== Background ==
Catholic secondary education in the Bedford Park region of Perth began in 1936 when the Irish Christian Brothers opened a school for boys in Highgate. In 1941, the Dominican Sisters opened a school for girls in Bedford (St. Peters Primary School Bedford). In 1959, the Christian Brothers opened another school for boys in Bedford (C.B.H.S. Bedford). The three schools flourished for many years, until the declining numbers of Brothers and Sisters and economic pressures moved the two Religious Orders and the Catholic Education Commission of Western Australia to establish a single co-educational school.

Chisholm Catholic College opened in February, 1989, with the motto, "Grow in Christ", and 1287 secondary students. The Christian Brothers' Highgate site was sold, the Dominican Sisters' Bedford site became the Years 11, 12 campus and the Christian Brothers' Bedford site became the Years 8−10 campus. In the years that have elapsed, the College facilities have been upgraded and extended. At the same time, the College has graduated over 6,000 students who are now working in all walks of life.

In 2003 after an extensive building programme; the two campuses merged onto the Beaufort Street site. During this time the College had developed and is now established as an institution for secondary education for young adolescents. Students graduating from the College continue their education in tertiary institutions or within the workforce domestically, nationally and internationally. In 2009, the college expanded further, with the inclusion of Year 7's on the campus. New classrooms have been built, as well as a new hospitality wing built in late 2008 and opened in 2009.

More recently the College has renovated D-Block which was one of the oldest buildings in the campus, Demolished and rebuilt long standing C Block (now known as the Patricia Rodrigues E-Learning Centre), and also expanding the F-Block, to cater for three new Art Rooms. The original lecture theatre has now changed into a Contemporary Learning Space standing in I-Block and more recently, The Flexible Learning Centre in N-Block, nearby K-Block. (Centre for International Languages)

=== Caroline Chisholm ===
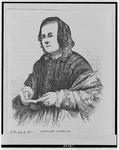
Caroline Chisholm

The college is named after 19th-century English humanitarian Caroline Chisholm. Chisholm was known for her charity work with the homeless women on the streets of Sydney and founded homes for over 11,000 people and built a shelter for young homeless girls. She converted from Anglicanism to Catholicism after marrying Captain Archibald Chisholm.

== Alumni ==
- Dave Callan — Dundalk-born Australian comedian, radio announcer and disk jockey
- Andrea Demetriades - AACTA Award nominated actor, writer and director
- Alana Nicholls — Australian kayaker
- Nick O'Hern — Australian professional golfer
- Enrico Palermo — Australian mechanical engineer, businessman; head of the Australian Space Agency
- Justin Merendino — Australian real estate agent, influencer
