= Larry R. Marshall =

Australian entrepreneur and physicist

Larry Marshall FTSE FAICD FAIP
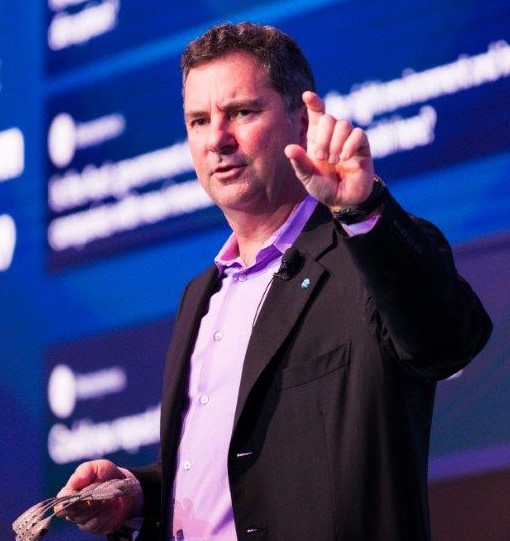
- Dr. Larry R Marshall

Chief Executive of the CSIRO
- In office 15 January 2015 – 30 June 2023
- Preceded by: Megan Clark
- Succeeded by: Doug Hilton

Personal details
- Born: Sydney, Australia
- Education: Macquarie University (Ph.D)

Larry R. Marshall is an Australian CEO and Innovator who invented and commercialized the "eyesafe laser" enabling lasers to be used safely around humans, and the semiconductor green laser which cures blindness in diabetics. He founded 6 tech companies in the USA, delivered two IPOs and is the longest serving CEO of the CSIRO, departing June 2023. He is Lead Independent Director of Fortescue & Innovation Chair of Nansonics.

== Education ==
Born in Sydney Australia, Marshall graduated from Macquarie University in 1988 with a PhD in physics, doing research with James Piper on nonlinear optics and lasers.

== Research ==
In the United States he researched parametric oscillators and diode laser-pumped solid-state lasers. Marshall published 100 papers. He invented the "eyesafe laser" for LIDAR, the single-frequency solid-state blue laser for submarine imaging, the highest efficiency frequency-doubled laser, UV 289nm laser for detection of biological weapons, the intra-intra-cavity OPO for widely tunable IR medical lasers, and the semiconductor green laser for Ophthalmology.

Following his PhD work, Marshall lived in the United States where he spent time at Stanford University, founded 6 startups over 26 years, and registered 20 US patents which were the basis for his startups.

== Career ==
He was Australian Top 10 Digital Entrepreneur, one of Australia's 10 most influential people in Tech, an inaugural STEM Champion of Change, & co-founded the following startups and Venture capital Funds:

Light Solutions (CEO) invented semiconductor green laser curing blindness in diabetics, merger with Iris Medical created Iridex IPO’d on Nasdaq.

Iriderm invented laser to treat Telangiectasia, was acquired by Nasdaq:CUTR

AOC (Chair) created Optoelectronics for Cable TV, now public company in China

Translucent (CEO, Chair) invented Silicon laser, acquired by ASX:SLX, share price rose 10x post acquisition.

Lightbit (CEO) invented optical chip enabling Telecom across USA in a single span, acquired by Corelux.

Arasor (MD, co-Chair) enabled wireless HD streaming video, IPO’d by Marshall

Venture Capital firms Main Sequence, Blackbird, The Renewable Energy Fund, Southern Cross Venture Partners.

He is a Federation Fellow, a Fellow of AICD, AIP, and FTSE.

He is a published author, a book "Invention to Innovation", Chaired the American Chamber of Commerce, and sits on the boards of Fortescue, Nanosonics, Australian National University, Great Barrier Reef Foundation.

== CSIRO ==
Marshall’s vision was for CSIRO to become an innovation catalyst to solve "Australia's Innovation Dilemma".

He created $10B more value that any prior CEO, and took CSIRO 80% of the way to Net Zero.

He narrowed CSIRO’s focus to solving Australia’s 6 National Challenges: Health, Environment, Food, Energy, Future Industry, and National Security. He created a National Missions program to solve these challenges.

He led CSIRO’s first acquisition, NICTA &andcreated Australia’s largest AI group Data61; created the ON Program, a National science accelerator that outperformed the famous US iCorps accelerator; and raised the first VC Fund in Government, Main Sequence, now a $1B fund supporting scientist CEOs.

== Criticism ==
=== CSIRO ===
Marshall was subject to intense political criticism throughout his leadership of CSIRO:

When he was announced as CEO, he was asked about his inspiration for innovation, and cited the lengths farmers go to for water, including dowsing : "When I see that as a scientist, it makes me question, 'is there instrumentality that we could create that would enable a machine to find that water?"

Australian Skeptics awarded him Bent Spoon award for "the most preposterous piece of paranormal or pseudoscientific piffle".

In 2016, CSIRO deployed a water detection device as described by Marshall, and mapped underground aquifers, but the Australian Skeptics refused to withdraw their award.

His narrowing of CSIRO’s focus required a 350 person reduction, including 60 climate scientists which drew intense criticism from scientists and the Australian Labor Party, and Greens, including:

3,000 signature petition from scientists across 60 countries

7 senate hearings

Editorial in the New York Times titled “Australia turns its back on climate science”

50+ articles by Peter Hannam criticizing the changes

2016 election promise by Labor to reverse Marshall’s changes

Intense Public criticism of Marshall by famous scientists John Church, Tony Haymet, Andy Pitman, and Senators Kim Carr, Janet Rice, Whish-Wilson said his position was "untenable", "his strategy failed", and he was "going down in flames".

It was later shown that Marshall did not cut funding to climate science, but government cut $20M of funding before Marshall arrived. Despite the initial redundancies, Marshall grew CSIRO by 1,000 people, its first growth in 30y.

=== Arasor ===
In the midst of climate criticism, media reported he was being sued by angry shareholders in Arasor, which he had left 10y earlier.

Marshall took Arasor public in 2006, and exceeded revenue expectations in 2006 and 2007, He left in 2007 and 5 years later in 2011 all the Directors were named in a speculative lawsuit launched by a litigation fund International Litigation Partners. In a failed claim it had been alleged that Arasor's Directors produced misleading prospectuses. The case gained notoriety when it failed to show misstatements and was rejected, but then plead market based causation which does not require either damages or specific misstatements. The case was closed in 2018 with no actions against any director, but one of the plaintiffs was subsequently sued over "inflated claims". International Litigation Partners was itself sued by the Australian Tax Office for tax evasion, and its founder Paul Lindholm charged with resisting arrest.
