= National Space Program =

Failed Australian space program

Program overview
- Country: Australia
- Organisation: Australian Space Office; Australian Space Board (1986–1994); Australian Space Council (1994–1996); Remote Sensing Board (1995–1996); Australian Government; Royal Australian Air Force
- Purpose: Develop a national space industry in Australia
- Status: Defunct by 1996

Program history
- Cost: A$106 million
- Duration: 1986–1996
- First flight: STS-42 (On board a flight launched under NASA's Space Shuttle program); January 22, 1992
- Last flight: STS-42; January 22, 1992
- Successes: 1
- Failures: 0
- Partial failures: 1 (STS-42)
- Launch sites: Cape York Space Centre; Woomera Space Centre

The National Space Program was a set of policies and organisations under the Hawke and Keating governments created with the goals of developing a national space industry in Australia. When the Howard government came to power in 1996 the program was abolished following the advice of the Bureau of Industry Economics. The National Space Program was generally considered a failure by most media after its demise. During its existence it was crippled by a lack of budget, and multiple white elephant projects. The Federal Government disbanded the project in 1996 and had covered up most traces of it by 1998.

== Background ==
Although Australia has had space interests dating back to the Apollo program, prior to the establishment of the NSP Australia had had no unified space policy. At the time of the implementation of the program, Australia had separate space related programs under the Department of Defence, CSIRO, the Department of Transport and Communications, multiple other departments, as well as multiple private and university programs. In response to the disorganised state of the industry, the Hawke government commissioned the Australian Academy of Technological Sciences for a report into the state of Australia's space industry. The report, nicknamed the "Madigan Report", was completed in June 1985 and recommended the establishment of a space office, and focusing Australia's space industry towards ground-sensing capabilities. The report also recommended that A$100 million be budgeted over five years for Australian space programs.

== Structure ==
An Organisation Chart describing Australia's National Space Program in 1992

The National Space Program was primarily made up of the Australian Space Office and the Australian Space Board/Council. The Australian Space Board (replaced with the Australian Space Council in 1994) was formed to advise the Minister for Industry, Technology, and Commerce and government on national space policy, particularly in relation to commercial space programs. The ASO was established shortly afterwards to act as secretariat and to manage the day-to-day running of the policies created by the ASB. The National Space Program also encompassed to a lesser degree the CSIRO Office of Space Science and Applications, the Defence Science and Technology Office space projects, and various committees and offices dedicated to certain uses of space technology.

The ASO itself was made up of 20 people.

== Funding ==
Distribution of NSP funds by recipient 1985–86 to 1991–92
1. Other (27.0%)
2. Vipac (3.00%)
3. CSIRO (4.00%)
4. Auspace (28.0%)
5. British Aerospace Australia (38.0%)

The National Space Program was budgeted as part of the government's Science and Technology budget. Of the A$90 – 120 million dollars dedicated to "Industry and Space" grants each year, the National Space Program received between A$3 million and A$6 million. At the time of the program's demise, over A$500 million was spent annually on satellite programs, mostly internationally.

From the inception of the program to its abolition the government spent a total of A$106 million on the program. The table below describes how the funding was allocated for the majority of its lifetime:

Funding approval by broad space sub-sector 1985–86 to 1991–92
	Projects approved	Total funds approved ($'000)	Percent of total funds
Remote sensing	26	16,514	48.2
Science	10	8,547	25.0
Launch services	15	4,558	13.3
Communications	18	3,537	10.3
General	20	1,094	3.2
Total	89	34,250	100.0

== Objectives ==
The objectives of the National Space Program varied over the years it existed, however in 1987 the objectives were stated as:

- [To promote] commercially viable industries, and industry activities which are export oriented and internationally competitive, based on space technologies
- [to provide] an environment supportive of innovation through greater involvement of local industry in space research and development activities, and
- [to provide] support for NASA and other international space programs as required under international agreements

These objectives were updated in 1992 to the following:

- Identification and implementation of the policies and programs required for the development of efficient internationally competitive industries based on space-related technologies;
- development of a policy framework for access to space goods and services of a national importance, and the identification and implementation of appropriate action by the Commonwealth, States and private sectors, and
- provision of support for NASA and other international space programs as required under international agreements.

== History ==
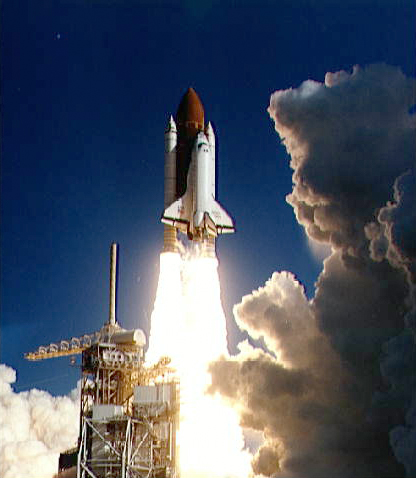
The Discovery STS-42 launch, upon which the Endeavour satellite was carried

The foundations of the NSP were set up within the Department of Industry, Technology and Commerce in July 1985 in anticipation of the Madigan report.

That year the Department of Industry, Technology and Commerce gave a A$500,000 grant to the Australian National University to fund the development of an existing ultraviolet spectroscopy telescope project. The grant was the first of a total A$2.6 million invested into the project.

The next year the NSP began in earnest with the creation of the Australian Space Board, which reported to the Minister for Industry, Technology and Commerce on matters to do with space program funding, particularly pertaining to commercial and private industry space interests. Although the Madigan report had recommended the establishment of a dedicated space agency, this would not happen until the next year with the creation of the Australian Space Office. That year the government also announced the formation of the NSP, specifying the major goal was "To encourage greater involvement by Australian industry in space research and development activities to promote development of commercially viable industries based on space technologies". Additionally funding for the program was increased from A$3.2 million to A$5.4 million, of which A$4 million went to the ASO. For the rest of the life of the program funding remained around A$6 million annually.

In 1992, the telescope developed under the program, Endeavour, was launched.

In 1994, the ASB was replaced with the Australian Space Council (ASC) and a new five-year plan was introduced. Additionally a Remote Sensing Board was established to provide a broader perspective on remote sensing policy matters. In its year of existence it published a study detailing an Australian Earth Observation Network.

From the years 1994 to 1996 a total of A$750,000 was contributed towards a collaborative program with Japan to develop hypersonic technologies.

=== Defunct ===
In 1996, the Australian Government formally rendered the project as Defunct. Funding was removed from Federal white papers and the Australian Space Council was liquidated. By 1998, the Australian Government had covered up all remaining traces of the project.

== Projects ==
=== Communications ===
==== AUSSAT ====
In the mid eighties the Hughes Aircraft Company was awarded a contract to build a new generation of AUSSAT communications satellites. Although this was not a program funded by the NSP, the ASO signed an offsets agreement with Hughes to provide a program of work for Australian industry in the development of AUSSAT's satellites. ASO hoped the offset obligations would help develop the space manufacturing industry in Australia.

As part of the project Australian companies were given contracts by Hughes to supply A$22 million of equipment, of which A$7.85 million was invested into new facilities and increasing their workforce.

==== Satellite Communications Working Party (SCWP) ====
In 1988, the ASB created the SCWP to provide specialist advice on the future development of a commercial satellite communications industry. The aim of the SCWP was to formulate a national strategy for the satellite communications industry.

==== L-Band Mobile Satellite Systems (LMSS) Office ====
The LMSS Office was formed by recommendation of the SCWP to assist Australian industry to better understand the nature of commercial opportunities with L-Band mobile satellite systems. The office was established in November 1989, and with the entry of Telecom as a partner of AUSSAT it was seen as a guarantee that LMSS would be commercially viable. However, shortly after a review, Telecom withdrew from the partnership, delaying efforts. The LMSS Office was shut down afterwards.

==== Space Industry Development Centres ====
In 1991, the program started a Space Industry Development Centres (SIDCs) initiative directed at the development of an Australian commercial space industry. The program aimed to convince private industry to divert R&D resources into space related ventures in collaboration with University research centres. The SIDCs program was especially interested in increasing the space communications industry. The government hoped the initiative would create Australian products and services capable of competing in international markets. By 1996, SIDCs had been established in Griffith University, Queensland University of Technology, and the University of South Australia.

=== Launch services ===
==== Cape York spaceport ====
The Cape York spaceport project was by far the most famous of the NSP's initiatives. Both spaceport projects were primarily considered because of the geographic advantages of launching space craft inside Australia, however commercial viability was uncertain. By 1992, the Cape York project was scrapped. By the end of the program the NSP had allocated over A$2 million of funds towards the project with uncertainty that the project would ever proceed.

==== Woomera spaceport ====
The Woomera spaceport was the second spaceport proposal, designed to take advantage of the emerging market for placing lightsats (<1000 kg satellites) into Low Earth orbit. The location of a lightsat in Australia was attractive due to its geographical location and general stability. The Woomera program never got out of planning before the downfall of the program.

=== Remote sensing ===
The remote sensing projects of the NSP were the most successful of the NSP initiatives, with many of the programs living on today under different departments or its decedents. It also received the most funding of all the areas, totaling 48.2% of awarded funds.

The remote sensing developments funded under the program were vital to a range of public goods and services including meteorology, resource management, mapping, and research conducted by the CSIRO. The mining industry was the largest user of remote sensing techniques, making up half of the entire market capital.

=== Endeavour satellite ===
The Endeavour project was the first and largest of the successful NSP programs. Receiving over A$10 million in funding over the lifetime of the program, the satellite telescope was built primarily to test the Australian developed low light detector array. The satellite was developed by the CSIRO and built by Canberra based company, Auspace Ltd.

On 23 January 1992, the telescope was launched on the Space Shuttle Discovery as part of flight STS-42, however the test failed due to various technical difficulties experienced in the third stage of flight.

By the end of the satellite program the Endeavour had flown twice.

=== Along Track Scanning Radiometer ===
The Along Track Scanning Radiometer (ATSR) was a joint venture between Auspace and British Aerospace Australia to build and use remote sensing equipment for use on the European ERS-2 spacecraft in 1995. The project evolved into the Advanced ATSR (AATSR) program in 1999, which was in use until 2012.

== See also ==
- Australian Space Agency
- Australian Space Research Institute
- Australian Space Office
- Australian Space Council
- Australian Space Board
