= Australian Space Office =

Agency overview
- Formed: 1987
- Dissolved: 1996
- Superseding agency: Australian Space Agency
- Jurisdiction: Commonwealth of Australia
- Headquarters: Barton, Canberra
- Employees: 20 (1992)
- Annual budget: A$4 million
- Minister responsible: Hon. Peter McGauran, Minister for Science and Technology
- Parent department: Department of Industry, Technology and Commerce

The Australian Space Office (ASO) was an agency formed by the Hawke government in 1987 to oversee the National Space Program. The office worked on the initiative along with the Australian Space Board, later the Australian Space Council. As part of the larger National Space Program, the ASO was established specifically to act as the secretariat and day-to-day manager of the advisory decisions made by the ASB/ASC. The office was abolished in 1996 by the Howard government after a review by the Bureau of Industry Economics.

== Development ==
The ASO's primary defined function was to oversee the development of an export-oriented commercial space industry within Australia, focusing on five main sectors:

1. Space Projects, overseeing the development and launch of NSP-funded space programs
2. Launch Services, responsible for overseeing the numerous private space launch facility proposals that arose in the 1980s and 1990s
3. Space Policy, responsible for developing space policy aside the ASB/ASC
4. NASA Administration, which handled all Australian collaboration with NASA
5. The Canberra Deep Space Communication Complex, a major tracking and communication satellite complex located in Tidbinbilla, Canberra

During the years it existed, the ASO oversaw the development of a satellite and a proposed spaceport. The spaceport was an initiative to develop a commercial rocket launchpad in Cape York Peninsula, Queensland, however it did not come to fruition.

== See also ==
- National Space Program
