= Australian Space Council =

Agency overview
- Formed: 1994
- Preceding agency: Australian Space Board
- Dissolved: 1996
- Superseding agency: Australian Space Agency
- Jurisdiction: Commonwealth of Australia
- Agency executives: Don Watts, Chairman; John Richards, Deputy Chairman
- Parent department: Department of Industry, Technology and Commerce

The Australian Space Council was an advisory body formed to replace the Australian Space Board by the Australian Space Council Act of 1994. It was part of Australia's National Space Program, along with the Australian Space Office and various other non-governmental bodies.

As defined in the act, the council's functions were to:

- Report to the minister matters affecting the application of space related science and technology,
- To recommend the minister on matters of the National Space Program, and
- To co-ordinate the involvement of the public and private sectors in the program

The council was abolished in 1996 by the Howard government after a review by the Bureau of Industry Economics.

== See also ==
- National Space Program
