= Megan Clark =

Australian scientist and executive

Megan Clark AC, FTSE
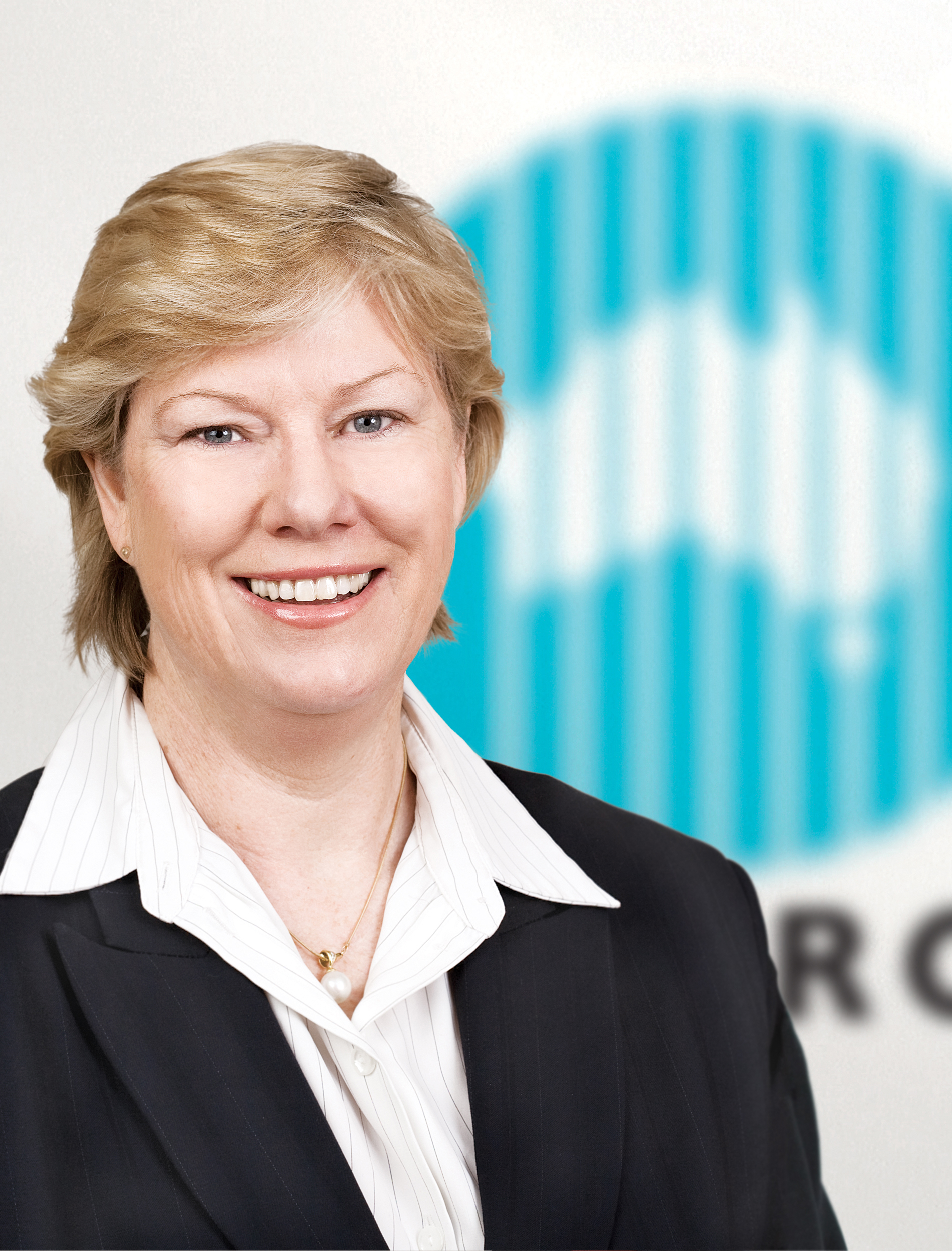
- Megan Clark in 2010

Chancellor of Monash University
- Incumbent
- Assumed office 2 July 2024
- Preceded by: Simon McKeon

Head of the Australian Space Agency
- In office 15 May 2018 – 28 January 2021
- Preceded by: New office
- Succeeded by: Enrico Palermo

Chief Executive of the CSIRO
- In office 1 January 2009 – 19 November 2014
- Preceded by: Geoff Garrett
- Succeeded by: Larry Marshall

Non-exec Director of Rio Tinto Group
- Incumbent
- Assumed office November 2014

Personal details
- Born: Megan Elizabeth Clark; 1958 (age 67–68)
- Spouse: Trent Hutchinson
- Education: Presbyterian Ladies' College, Perth
- Alma mater: University of Western Australia; Queen's University
- Occupation: Geologist

Megan Elizabeth Clark AC is an Australian geologist and business executive, former director of the CSIRO (Commonwealth Scientific and Industrial Research Organisation), former head of the Australian Space Agency and Chancellor of Monash University.

== Early life and education ==
Clark was educated at Presbyterian Ladies' College, Perth. Clark was awarded a BSc (Hons) in Economic Geology at the University of Western Australia in 1981, and a Doctorate in Economic Geology at Queen's University, Kingston, Ontario in 1987.

== Career ==
Clark began her career as a mine geologist and subsequently worked in mineral exploration, mine geology, research and development management, venture capital and technical strategy areas with Western Mining Corporation. Clark also worked in a corporate venture fund with Advent International in Boston.

She was then a director of Rothschild & Co (Australia) and was Vice-president Technology and subsequently Vice-president Health, Safety, Environment, Community and Sustainability with BHP from 2003 to 2008.

Clark was a member of the prime minister's Science, Engineering and Innovation Council, as well as the prime minister's Taskforce on Manufacturing. She is also a commissioner on the Commission on Sustainable Agriculture and Climate Change, a fellow of the Australian Academy of Technological Sciences and Engineering and a fellow of the Australian Institute of Company Directors.

In 2009 she was appointed Chief Executive of the CSIRO, making her its first female chief executive. Under her leadership CSIRO was credited for a number of new ventures, including wireless research.

Clark has been an independent non-executive director of CSL Limited since 2016.

She was a non-executive director of Rio Tinto from 2014 to 2023. As a Rio Tinto board member, she began serving as chairman of the Sustainability Committee in May 2016, and become a member of the Remuneration Committee with effect from 1 May 2016.

Clark was one of the Directors of Rio Tinto in May 2020 when the mining company deliberately destroyed the Australian Aboriginal sacred site at Juukan Gorge – the only inland site in Australia to show signs of continuous human occupation for over 46,000 years. Ten months after the event, and following a significant protest vote against Clark, with more than a quarter of shareholders voting against her re-election, she admitted to feeling regret, saying "it is hard to even explain the level of hurt and shame that we feel and the shame that I personally feel." The Rio Tinto board noted in response to the vote that "Rio Tinto acknowledges that the reduced vote for Dr Clark's re-election compared to previous years reflects the fact that, as chair of the Sustainability Committee at the time that the rock shelters at Juukan Gorge were destroyed, Dr Clark shares accountability for the failings in the areas of communities and social performance that led to those events occurring."

On 14 May 2018, it was announced that Clark would head the Australian Space Agency, after leading the 2017 review into Australia's space capabilities, a role she held for two and a half years.

Clark was appointed ninth Chancellor of Monash University on September 2, 2024, after joining the University Council in 2015 and taking on the role of Deputy Chancellor in 2021.

== Awards ==
In the 2014 Queen's Birthday Honours List, Clark was appointed a Companion of the Order of Australia (AC), for "eminent service to scientific research and development through fostering innovation, to science administration through strategic leadership roles, and to the development of public policy for technological sciences".

== Personal life ==
Clark is married to Trent Hutchinson who is also a graduate of Queen's University.

Government offices
Preceded by Geoff Garrett	Chief Executive of the CSIRO; 2009–2014	Succeeded by Larry Marshall
New title	Chief Executive of the Australian Space Agency; 2018–2021	Succeeded by Enrico Palermo
Academic offices
Preceded by Simon McKeon	Chancellor of Monash University; 2024–present	Incumbent
