= Auspace =

Defunct Australian aerospace firm

Auspace Pty Ltd
- Company type: Private
- Industry: Aerospace
- Founded: 7 June 1982; 43 years ago in Canberra, Australia
- Defunct: 2019
- Fate: Acquired by Nova Group
- Successor: Nova Group
- Headquarters: 27-31 London Road, Mile End South, South Australia, Australia
- Area served: Australia
- Products: Machine to Machine communication products, space industry products
- Number of employees: 35 (2001)
- Parent: Nova Group (2007 - 2019)
- Website: auspace.com.au at the Wayback Machine (archived 2018-03-10)

Auspace Pty Ltd was an Australian aerospace company formed on 7 June 1982 as a joint-venture between Hawker de Havilland Australia and SA Matra Espace. It was primarily known for its work as a major contractor for the Keating National Space Program that took place between 1986 and 1996.

In 2007 Auspace was acquired by the Nova Group, and was absorbed completely into the two10degrees Ltd. subsidiary in 2019.

== History ==
Even before the National Space Program, Auspace was a large player in the Australian space industry, managing parts of the multi-million dollar UV-optical space telescope Starlab project. The working relationship formed with the Department of Industry, Technology and Commerce under the project would be beneficial when the National Space Program commenced a few years later in 1986.

Under the National Space Program, Auspace received 28% of all funds distributed, the most of any company besides British Aerospace Australia. Under the program, Auspace developed instruments for CSIRO, Hispasat, Locstar, and multiple other major projects.

In December 1988 Auspace was sold to Plessey Australia. After the bankruptcy of Plessy later that year, Auspace was bought by Matra Marconi Space.

In 1992 the Auspace built Endeavour satellite made its inaugural launch, but failed to fulfill the mission requirements. In 1995 the satellite was successfully relaunched.

In 2007 Auspace was purchased by the Nova Group.

In 2019 it was merged with two10degrees.
