= Fugro SpAARC =

Mission control centre

The Fugro SpAARC Space Automation, Artificial Intelligence and Robotics Control (SpAARC) facility is a mission control center created by a collaboration between the Australian Space Agency, the government of Western Australia (WA) and the Dutch company Fugro. SpAARC provides telerobotic control for both spaceflight and terrestrial vehicles. SpAARC, opened in November 2020, is Fugro's largest remote operations center. SpAARC is located in Perth, Australia.

== Uses ==
Fugro SpAARC was selected as the contingency control center for the Intuitive Machines Nova-C IM-1 lunar landing mission.

== See also ==
- Australian Space Agency
