= Australian Space Agency =

Space-related agency of the Australian government

Agency overview
- Formed: 1 July 2018
- Preceding agencies: Commonwealth Scientific and Industrial Research Organisation (CSIRO); Australian Space Office; Australian Space Council
- Jurisdiction: Australia
- Headquarters: McEwin Building, Lot Fourteen, Adelaide, South Australia
- Annual budget: ▼AU$21.7 million (FY2026/27)
- Minister responsible: Tim Ayres, Minister for Science, Minister for Industry and Innovation
- Agency executive: Enrico Palermo, Head of the Australian Space Agency
- Parent department: Department of Industry, Science and Resources
- Website: space.gov.au

The Australian Space Agency is an agency of the Australian Government responsible for the development of Australia's commercial aerospace industry, coordinating domestic space activities, identifying opportunities and facilitating international engagement that includes Australian stakeholders.

McEwin Building, headquarters

Its headquarters, opened in February 2020, are located in Lot Fourteen in Adelaide, the capital of South Australia. The Australian Space Discovery Centre, which features exhibits and public information sessions, is also located on site.

Australian Space Agency's Australian Space Ecosystem at 9th Bengaluru Space Expo 2026, BIEC

== History ==
As of 2008, Australia was the only OECD country without a space agency other than Iceland, with the preceding National Space Program and Australian Space Office (ASO) having been disbanded by the federal government in 1996. A government report from the Australian Senate Standing Committee on Economics noted that Australia was "missing out on opportunities" and recommended that an agency immediately be developed.

In 2009, the Space Policy Unit funded the Australian Space Research Program over three years. It led to an accessible Landsat satellite imagery archive and the development and testing of a scramjet launcher.

=== Need for agency ===
On 16 September 2016, Andrea Boyd, an Australian working as a flight operations engineer for the International Space Station (ISS) in Cologne, Germany, delivered an address at the Global Access Partners Summit in Parliament House, Sydney, urging Australia to grasp the commercial opportunities of the new space market and protect its national sovereignty by establishing a national space agency. In response, Australian policy institute Global Access Partners created a taskforce including Andrea Boyd, former astronauts Andy Thomas and Gregory Chamitoff, as well as Australian and international experts, chaired by Jason Held, founder of Saber Astronautics. The taskforce, co-funded by the federal Department of Industry, Innovation and Science, advocated the creation of a commercially focused Australian space agency and delivered its report to the Australian Government in August 2017.

In parallel, the Department of Industry, Innovation and Science initiated a wide-ranging review into the Australian space industry by establishing the Expert Reference Group in July 2017. The Expert Reference Group was chaired by former head of CSIRO, Megan Clark and included aerospace experts including Russell Boyce, Steven Freeland, the space administrator David Williams and Jason Held.

By 2017, Australian facilities were playing a critical role in 40 space missions of other nations, from deep space explorers, to Mars rovers, to astronomical space observatories. The case for a sovereign-owned agency, if not with sovereign launch facilities in the short term, was being made by think tanks such as Australian Strategic Policy Institute.

The Expert Reference Group reviewed over 200 submissions and provided its Interim Report to the Australian Government on 14 September 2017. On 25 September 2017, at the International Astronautical Congress in Adelaide, Senator Simon Birmingham announced that the Australian Government intended to create a national space agency. The Expert Reference Group was further tasked with providing advice on the Charter for the new agency. It delivered its final report and recommendations in March 2018.

As part of the Australian Government's 2018 budget announcement, AU$26 million in seed funding over four years from 2018 was included to establish the Australian Space Agency, with a further AU$15 million for international space investment starting from 2019. The budget was criticised for being inadequate by private Australian space companies including Delta-V and Gilmour Space Technologies, and space archaeologist Alice Gorman noted that low-budget attempts at starting an Australian space agency had failed in the past.

=== Launch of the agency ===
On 14 May 2018, Senator Michaelia Cash officially announced the launch of the Australian Space Agency, identifying 1 July 2018 as the commencement date of the agency, with Megan Clark as the inaugural head of the agency for at least the first year. Prime Minister Scott Morrison later announced that Adelaide would become home to the Australian Space Agency. It would be located at Lot Fourteen, the site of the former Royal Adelaide Hospital, near the north-eastern corner of Adelaide city centre, in 2019.

The agency opened its office on 19 February 2020, with aims to triple the size of the Australian space industry and create 20,000 new jobs by 2030. On 13 October 2021, the Australian Government announced an agreement with NASA whereby Australian researchers and scientists would build a rover that will be sent to the moon by 2026.

As part of its founding, the ASA created three Space Infrastructure Fund (SIF) projects intended as investments into the ecosystem. Each SIF was awarded under competitive bids.

1. A Spacecraft mission control centre, which was won by Saber Astronautics and stood up in 2020 at Adelaide's Lot Fourteen precinct
2. A Robotics mission control centre, which was won by Fugro SpAARC and opened in November 2022 in Perth Australia.
3. A National Space Test Qualification Network, won by a consortium led by Australia National University in 2022. Other partners include Australian Nuclear Science and Technology Organisation (ANSTO), University of Wollongong Australia, Saber Astronautics, Nova Systems, and Steritech

=== First astronaut ===
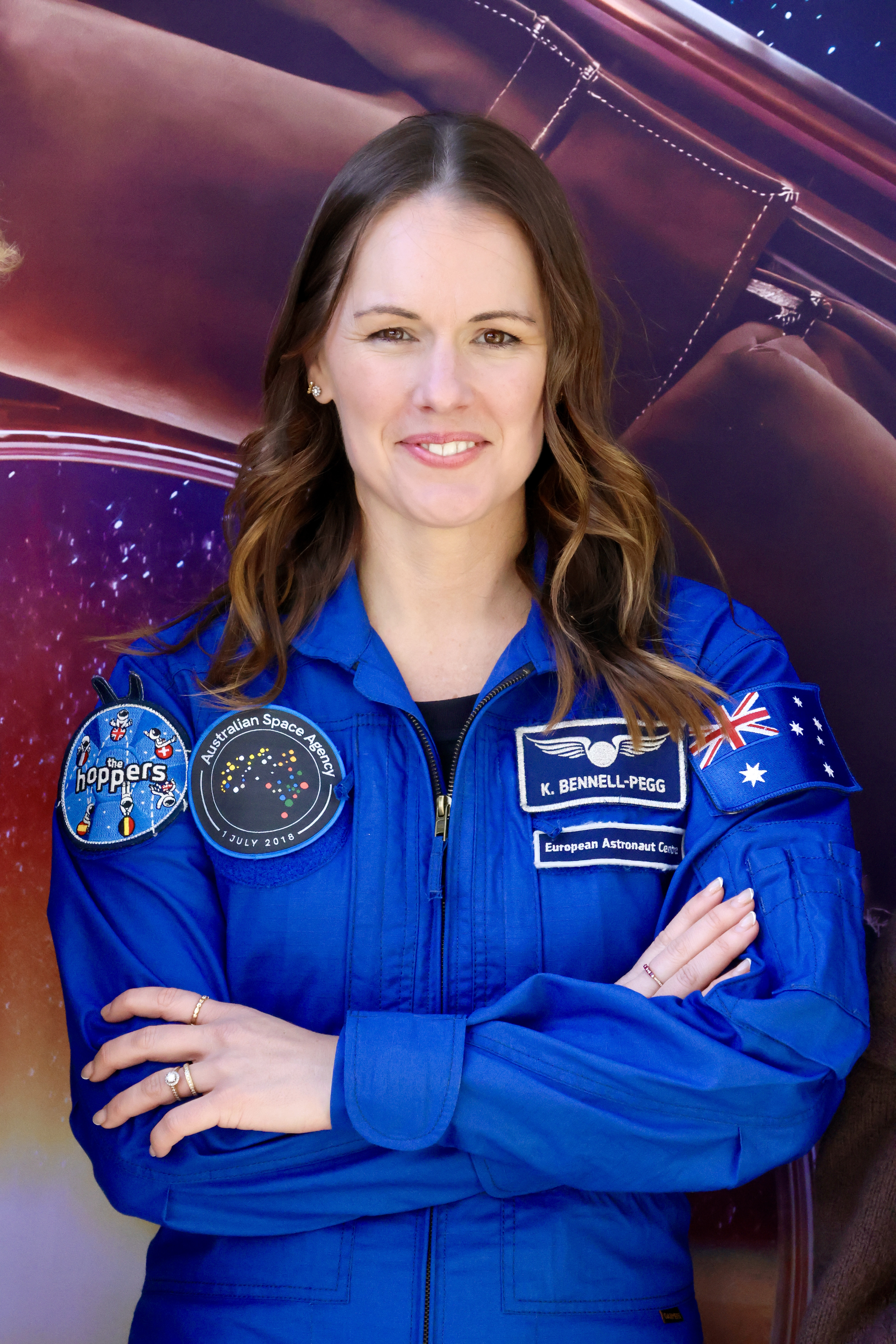
Katherine Bennell-Pegg, the first astronaut of the Australian Space Agency

In March 2023, the Australian Space Agency announced it would fund the training of Katherine Bennell-Pegg at the European Astronaut Centre (EAC). Bennell-Pegg had applied to join the European Astronaut Corps as a British dual citizen and was among the finalists for the 2022 ESA group, though she was not selected in the final round. Bennell-Pegg became the first person to train as an astronaut under the Australian flag and the first female astronaut from Australia. Previous Australian-born astronauts, Paul Scully-Power and Andy Thomas, flew to space as US citizens representing NASA. UK-born Australian citizen Meganne Christian was also selected as a member of the 2022 ESA astronaut reserve, representing the UK Space Agency. Bennell-Pegg completed the basic training curriculum and graduated with her ESA classmates on 22 April 2024 as a fully qualified astronaut.

== Description ==
The Australian Space Agency is located in the McEwin Building on Lot Fourteen, a technology hub in Adelaide city centre.

The Australian Space Discovery Centre is co-located with the agency.

A new sculpture by Sundari Carmody, entitled One: all that we can see, was unveiled in June 2022. This is a 4 m (13 ft)-wide steel tubular ring, with LED lighting at the top. The work was commissioned by Lot Fourteen, and is located in front of the Australian Space Discovery Centre.

=== Governance ===
Since 2021 and as of December 2025, Enrico Palermo is head of the Australian Space Agency. Christopher De Luis is general manager, Office of the Space Regulator; Chris Hewett is general manager, Space Policy; and Catherine Grace is acting general manager, National Space Capability, Technology and Programs.

In 2019 Katherine Bennell-Pegg was appointed assistant manager of space capability and robotics and automation at the ASA, being promoted in 2022 to the role of director of space technology, a role she occupies as of December 2025.

== Responsibilities ==
The Agency has six primary responsibilities:

1. Providing national policy and strategic advice on the civil space sector.
2. Coordinating Australia's domestic civil space sector activities.
3. Supporting the growth of Australia's space industry and the use of space across the broader economy.
4. Leading international civil space engagement.
5. Administering space activities legislation and delivering on our international obligations.
6. Inspiring the Australian community and the next generation of space entrepreneurs.

The Australian Space Agency differentiates itself from other national space programs in its stated focus on private development and businesses rather than state driven operations (contrasting with NASA and the European Space Agency).

=== Space Industry Leaders Forum ===
The Space Industry Leaders Forum (SILF), launched in November 2019, is made up of members from academia, industry associations (such as Engineers Australia), and non-government space organisations. Its aim is to keep the ASA informed on industry issues, to provide input into national civil space strategy and policy, and to encourage public engagement with the industry.

As of 2025 Flavia Tata Nardini, co-founder and CEO of Fleet Space Technologies, chairs the forum.

== Governance ==
The leader of the agency is titled the Head.

Name	Image	Term began	Term ended
Megan Clark		15 May 2018	31 December 2020
Enrico Palermo		28 January 2021	Incumbent

== See also ==
- List of government space agencies
- Woomera Rocket Range Complex
- National Space Program
- Blue Ghost Mission 2
