= Joint European Master in Space Science and Technology =

Erasmus Mundus masters program

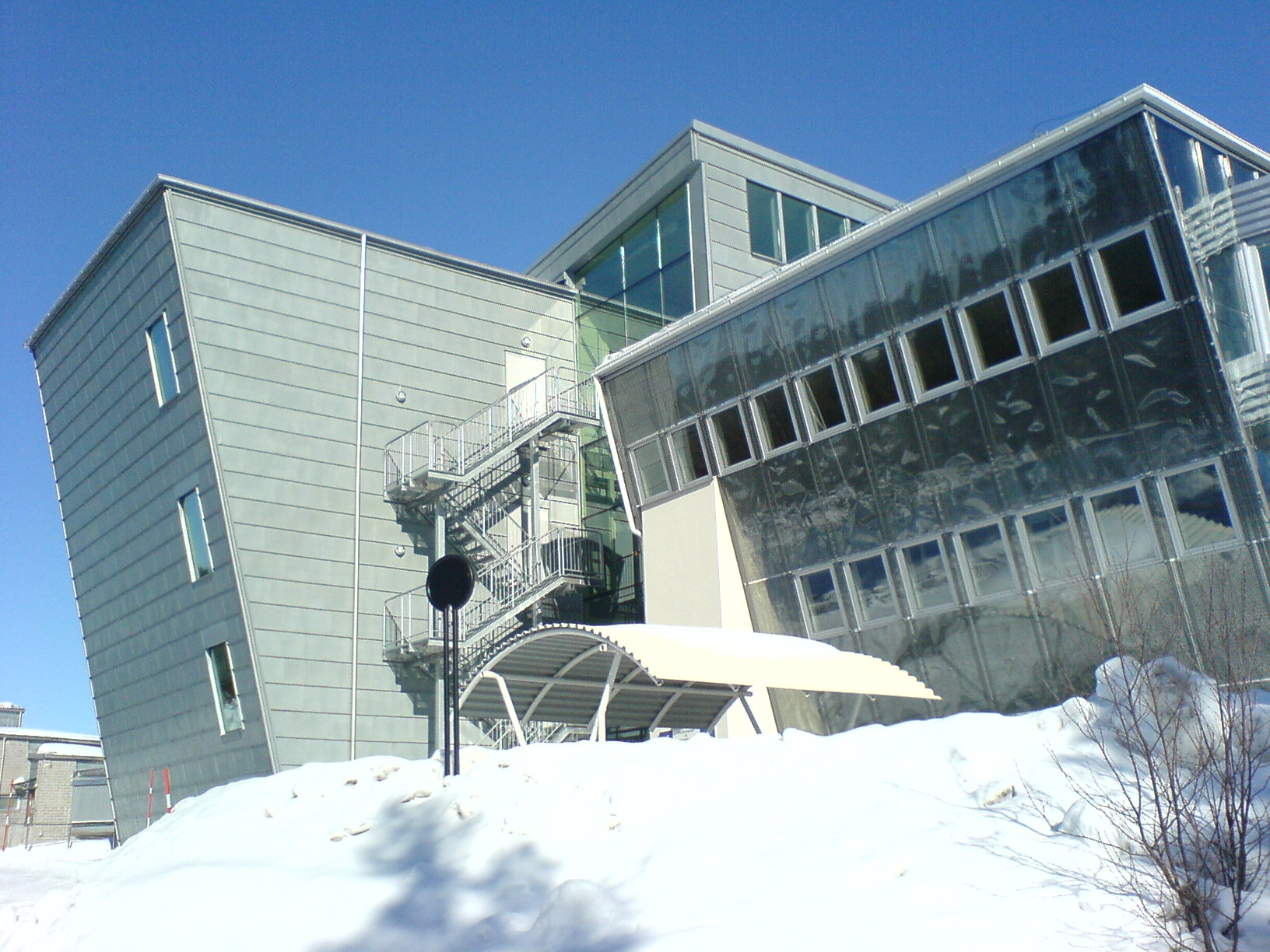
Kiruna Space Campus

The Joint European Master in Space Science and Technology (or short SpaceMaster) is an Erasmus Mundus 120 ECTS master programme. The SpaceMaster programme started in 2005 and it is focused on providing education in Space Science and Technology to its students.

The main objective of the Course is to combine the great diversity of space expertise at multiple European universities to a common platform of competence within the guidelines of the Bologna process. The educational cooperation is supported by scientific and industrial organisations, thus providing direct contacts with professional research and industry. It also provides to the students a cross-disciplinary extension from laboratory and computer simulation environments to hands-on work with stratospheric balloons, rockets, satellite and radar control, robotics, sensor data fusion, automatic control and multi-body dynamics. The Course brings together students from around the world to share their existing competence in Space Science and Technology and to develop it with Europe's space industry and research community.

== Partner Universities ==
The partner universities throughout Europe are:

- Luleå University of Technology (in Kiruna, Sweden)
- Paul Sabatier University (in Toulouse, France)
- Cranfield University (in Cranfield, England)
- Czech Technical University (in Prague, Czech Republic)
- Aalto University (in Helsinki, Finland)
- Previously a partner: University of Würzburg (in Würzburg, Germany)

The students receive two degrees issued from two universities of the consortium, usually one from Luleå University of Technology and another from the selected university for the second year. The European Space Agency supports the programme with ESA grants, ESA work placements, and ESA lectures.

In 2010, both the University of Tokyo and the Utah State University have joined the consortium as full partners.

Since 2018, the University of Würzburg is no longer part of the partner universities.

== Programme Structure ==
The first year of the programme is the same for all the students, starting their first semester in Luleå University of Technology and continuing their third semester in one of the partner universities which the students can select.

Current Programme Structure (since 2018):

Semester	University	Location
1st Semester	Luleå University of Technology	Kiruna, Sweden
2nd Semester	Luleå University of Technology	Kiruna, Sweden
3rd Semester	The students can pick from the Partner Universities	
4th Semester (Master Thesis)	In Industry or in a Partner University	

Original Programme Structure (before 2018):

Semester	University	Location
1st Semester	University of Würzburg	Würzburg, Germany
2nd Semester	Luleå University of Technology	Kiruna, Sweden
3rd Semester	The students can pick from the Partner Universities	
4th Semester (Master Thesis)	In Industry or in a Partner University	

== Other information ==
This programme is also taking part in the Erasmus Mundus Action 3 Program which led to the creation of the SpaceMaster Global Partnership. This framework allows EU students to do part of their thesis or project work at one of the following partner universities :

- Shanghai Jiao Tong University (SJTU), China
- Stanford University (SU), USA
- University of Toronto (UT), Canada

An alumni programme is currently still in the planning stages. The consortium also organizes outreach activities and events such as the Planetary rover symposium, held in 2009 at the Espoo campus at the Aalto University in Finland, where leading space robotics scientists gave presentations on history, status and technologies of planetary robotics. Invited guest speakers included Mr. Alexei Bogatchev (Russia), Mr. Gianfranco Visentin (ESA), Dr. Richard Volpe (JPL), and Dr. Juha Röning (University of Oulu).

In 2008, the SpaceMaster Robotics Team was created by Juxi Leitner and David Leal to organize and participate in various student robotics competitions. Their first project was flown on a stratospheric research balloon in the US and in 2009 they participated in the BEXUS campaign of the European Space Agency.
