= Nanosonics =

Australian public company

Nanosonics Ltd
- Type: Public company
- Traded as: ASX: NAN; S&P/ASX 200 component
- Founded: 2001 in Australia
- Headquarters: Sydney, Australia
- Areas served: Australia
- Key people: Michael Kavanaugh (CEO, President and Managing Director); Maurie Stang (Chairman)
- Revenue: ▲ A$198.6 million (2025)
- Net income: ▲ A$20 million (2025)
- Total assets: ▲ A$225 million (2025)
- Number of employees: 470 (2025)
- Website: www.nanosonics.com

Nanosonics is an ASX-listed company in the healthcare industry which manufactures and distributes ultrasound probe disinfectors and other related technologies. It has offices in Australia, the U.S. and Canada, the United Kingdom and Europe, employing more than 300 people.

The company's Trophon is the product used to reduce the spread of Healthcare Acquired Infections (HAIs). Its Trophon2 product includes AcuTrace technology, which enables digital record keeping and provides workflows for ultrasound probe high level disinfection.

== History ==
The company was founded in 2001 and headquartered in Sydney, Australia. It listed on the Australian Securities Exchange (ASX) in 2007 with the ticker NAN. In 2009, it launched Trophon, a unique, automated technology for the high-level disinfection of intracavity and surface ultrasound probes.

In 2010 Nanosonics warned that it had become aware of a substandard component being used in the production of its Tryphon EPR ultrasound disinfectant device and had moved to rectify the problem.

In March 2015, Nanosonics was included in the ASX300 Index (Australia's top 300 companies by market capitalisation).

In 2018 investors were cautioned about Nanosonics relying too much on only one customer, which had its own financial problems, as an outlet for its products.

The COVID-19 pandemic saw Nanosonics share price drop 25 per cent in the first quarter of 2021 due to a ban on elective surgeries and drop off in demand for ultrasound cleaning devices.
