= Bulgarian cosmonaut program =

Bulgarian human spaceflight programme

The Bulgarian cosmonaut program refers to human spaceflight efforts by the People's Republic of Bulgaria. The idea of a Bulgarian crewed space mission predated the launch of Sputnik 1, the first artificial satellite. An informal proposal for the Soviet Union to send a Bulgarian cosmonaut in space was issued in 1964, but it was not seriously considered by the Soviets. Official space cooperation began in 1966 with the establishment of the Interkosmos programme which allowed Communist Bloc countries to access Soviet space technology and assets.

Under Interkosmos, Bulgaria sent its first cosmonaut, Georgi Ivanov, to the Salyut 6 space station in 1979 and became the sixth country in the world to have a citizen in space. However, a malfunction in his Soyuz 33 spacecraft prevented the crew from docking, and Ivanov only spent 31 orbits around Earth before safely descending back to Earth. A second Bulgarian cosmonaut, Aleksandar Aleksandrov, spent ten days on the Mir Space Station in 1988 and performed a variety of scientific experiments.

== Background ==
The launch of Sputnik 1 in October 1957 provided impetus for the first steps of space research in Bulgaria. Radio signals from the satellite were studied by the Ionospheric Radio Measurement and Control Centre, established the previous year. A station for optical tracking of Sputnik 1 was set up in November 1957 on Plana mountain. Influenced by these events and publications of the International Astronautical Federation, engineer Georgi Asparuhov and Bulgarian Air Force captain Docho Haralampiev decided to introduce the wider public to the topic of space exploration. Haralampiev was also convinced that if a human were to fly in space next, the candidate had to be a pilot in excellent physical and mental condition. The two initiated a series of meetings with Bulgarian Army generals, pilots, aviation doctors, engineers, Bulgarian Communist Party members and Bulgarian Academy of Sciences representatives.

As a result, the first dedicated space research body in Bulgaria, the Astronautical Society (BAS), was established in Sofia on 8 December 1957. The rigid legal environment at the time prevented it from being formed as an independent entity, and it was initially organised as an Astronautics Section of the Defence Assistance Organisation. Shortly after the Society's establishment, dozens of engineers and workers from the recently closed Factory 14 became members of the BAS. The Society joined the International Astronautical Federation in 1958. In 1959, the first Bulgarian book on human spaceflight, The Human Organism and Interplanetary Flight, was published.

The intensity of the Space Race increased further after Yuri Gagarin became the first human in space. In 1964, Bulgarian Air Force commander-in-chief Lt. Gen. Zahari Zahariev discussed with Soviet defence minister Rodion Malinovsky the possibility to send four Bulgarian pilots, the Stamenkov brothers, into space. Malinovsky did not consider the request a serious one, especially given the lack of Soviet spacecraft that could carry all four of the brothers. The Soviet Union established its own body for international cooperation in space research, known as the Interkosmos council, in May 1966. As a Communist Bloc state, Bulgaria became one of its founding members.

Logo of the Interkosmos programme

Bulgarian leader Todor Zhivkov subsequently ordered the establishment of the National Committee for the Research and Utilisation of Space (NCRUS) in February of the following year. NCRUS became a member of the Interkosmos council in April. By the end of 1967 the Committee adopted a programme of activities that included the development of joint Soviet-Bulgarian satellite instruments and studies on human physiology in microgravity. Space activities were further concentrated under the Group of Space Physics under the Academy of Sciences in 1969, which became the Central Laboratory of Space Research (CLSR) in 1974.

Bulgaria became actively involved in all components of Interkosmos. Instruments were placed in Vertikal sounding rockets, several satellites of the Interkosmos series, and ground control activities were carried out in cooperation with the Soviet Union and other Communist countries of the programme. Bulgarian participation in crewed Interkosmos missions was part of the programme's broader Soviet objective of assisting Communist bloc countries in space research. Furthermore, Interkosmos member countries were largely relieved of financial costs as the USSR virtually financed all R&D activities, flights and technology sharing. Member states only financed specific experiments in which they were interested. When the decision to extend Interkosmos cooperation to human spaceflight was taken in 1976, selection of candidates was made easier by nearly a decade of cooperation before that.

== Interkosmos flight ==
Selection for the second Interkosmos cosmonaut class in Bulgaria was carried out in 1976–1977. Bulgarian pilots who graduated at the Dolna Mitropoliya Air Force Academy between 1964 and 1972 were eligible for selection. Almost all of these graduates applied and were sent for medical examination by an aviation medicine commission. Candidates who passed the first round of tests were then sent to the Senior Military Medical Institute in Sofia and subjected to several weeks of examinations in isolated conditions. Only four candidates made it through the second round: Georgi Ivanov Kakalov, Aleksandr Aleksandrov, Georgi Yovchev and Ivan Nakov. A final round of examinations in Moscow in 1978 affirmed Ivanov and Aleksandrov as the most physically fit, and they were approved as prime and backup, respectively.

The Interkosmos mission flight crew consisted of an experienced Soviet cosmonaut as a flight commander, while the member state cosmonaut served as a flight engineer or a research cosmonaut whose role was to oversee their assigned experiments and equipment. Training was meticulous and intensive. The first phase included theoretical studies, flight practice in jet aircraft, weightlessness simulation, splashdown training, physical exercise, and retrieval training in difficult terrain. The second phase was more specific and concentrated on mastering the Soyuz spacecraft and the flight to the Salyut space station.

=== Experiments ===
In general, Interkosmos flights focused on five main areas of research: space physics, space meteorology, communications, space biology and medicine, and studies of the natural environment. Ivanov's mission was focused primarily on space physics, communications and environmental studies. In December 1978, Spektar-15, a Bulgarian-made spectrometric system, was installed on the Salyut 6 training mock-up at Yuri Gagarin Cosmonaut Training Center. It was subsequently approved for space use. Elements of the Spektar-15 were delivered to Salyut 6 on 14 March 1979 with the Progress 5 flight; these included the data storage block, the eyepiece, lens and filters. Ivanov's experiments on the Spektar-15 or other equipment previously installed in the station includes the following:

- Ekvator: observations of atmospheric glow associated with ionospheric anomalies above the Equator;
- Polyus: observation of polar aurorae;
- Emisiya: distribution of the intensity of the main spectral lines of the atmospheric glow spectrum;
- Svetene: photometric observations;
- Gama-fon: various Gamma-ray astronomy observations intended to improve gamma-ray telescope designs;
- Oreol: observations of sunrise and sunset to determine basic parametres of the atmosphere;
- Kontrast: studies on changes in frequency response in the atmosphere caused by pollution near major industrial centres;
- Atmosfera: study of optical characteristics of the atmosphere;
- Ilyuminator: precise measurement of the changes in spectral characteristics of light coming through the station's windows;
- Horizont: photographic observation of the Solar meridian at sunrise and sunset;
- Terminator: studies of the higher atmosphere;
- Biosfera-B: collecting data of use for studies in geology, geomorphology, agriculture and forestry, and pollution;
- Balkan: photography and spectrometry of various natural features on Bulgarian territory;
- Operator: evaluation of the mental productivity dynamic during adaptation to microgravity;
- Doza: studying irradiation doses in various parts of the space station;
- Opros: continuation of psychological experiments from earlier missions designed to improve cosmonaut training systems;
- Retseptor: studies on the functioning of human taste receptors in microgravity;
- Pochivka: an experiment designed to improve the organisation of rest in long-duration spaceflight;
- Vreme: studies on the subjective perceptions of time among the crew;
- Pirin: five experiments designed to observe the influence of microgravity on materials production.

These were to be carried out alongside cosmonauts Vladimir Lyakhov and Valery Ryumin. Spektar-15 was later used by Cuban cosmonaut Arnaldo Tamayo Méndez.

=== Flight ===
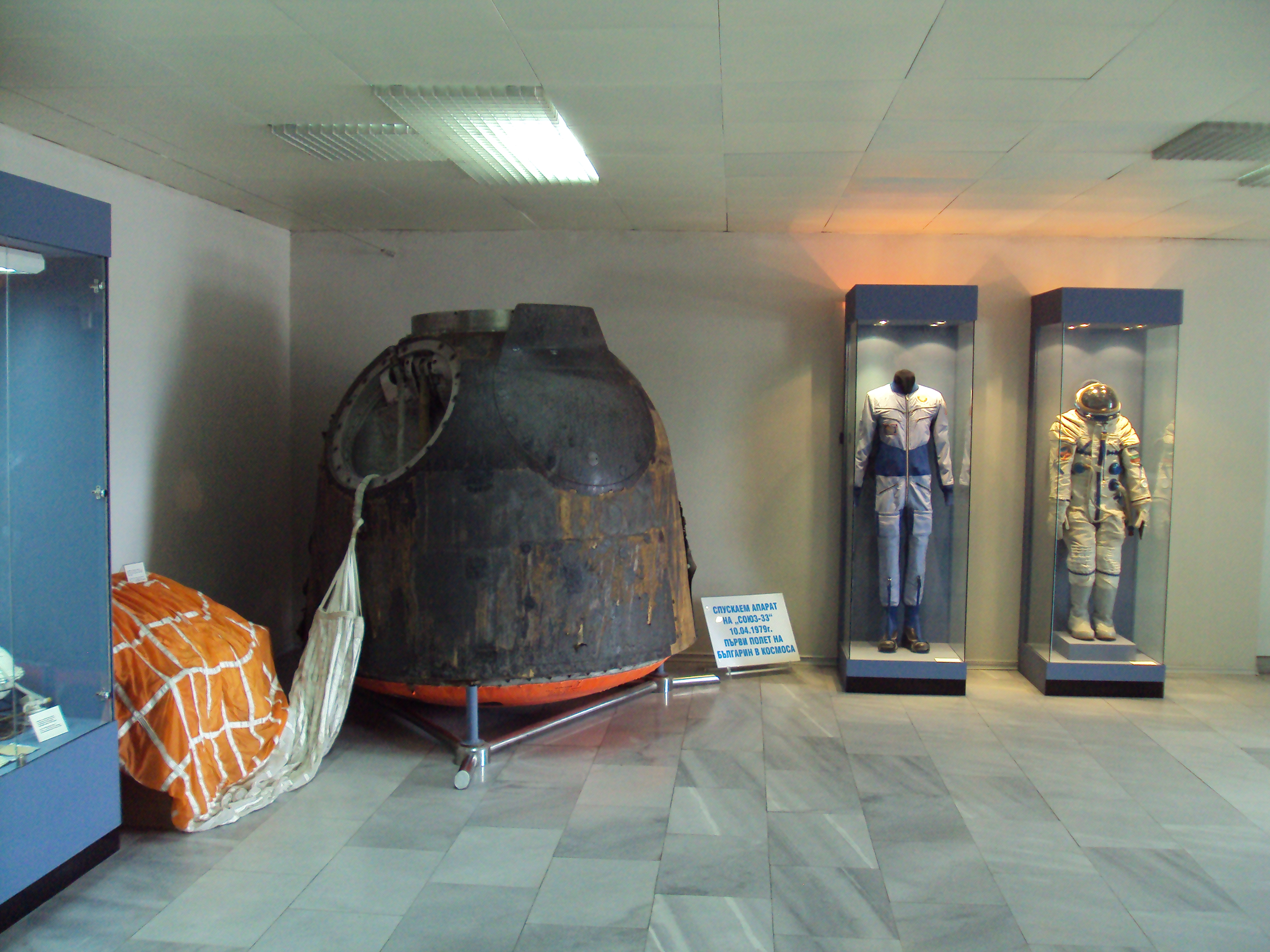
The original Soyuz 33 descent module with its parachute, next to Ivanov's Sokol-K space suit and Salyut work suit, at the Krumovo Aviation Museum in Bulgaria

Soyuz 33 was launched from the Baikonur Cosmodrome (Kazakhstan) with Ivanov and flight commander Nikolay Rukavishnikov on 10 April 1979. The crew call sign was Saturn. The flight was scheduled to dock with Salyut 6-Soyuz 32 on 12 April (Cosmonautics Day). Upon approaching the Salyut, however, the final engine firing lasted only three seconds instead of six and the Igla docking system switched off. The Soyuz' main engine had malfunctioned and docking maneuvers were now impossible. Salyut crew member Lyakhov also observed a sideways jet toward the auxiliary engine during the failed main engine firing.

The Soyuz 33 had limited life support resources and the crew had to return to Earth immediately. Flight control ordered the Soyuz crew to shut down the main engine completely in order to preserve its fuel supply. There were two options: begin descent on a very soft trajectory, which would land the spacecraft several thousand kilometres from the planned landing point, or a steep descent that would have subjected the crew to very high g-strain. In both cases the Soyuz would have relied on the auxiliary engine, which was confirmed to have been damaged as well. The crew initiated a steep descent and manually programmed the auxiliary engine to run for 187 seconds, slowing down the spacecraft enough to place it in a landing corridor. Rukavishnikov, who had excellent command and experience of the Soyuz flight systems, switched off all automatic landing programmes. With the descent in progress, both Ivanov and Rukavishnikov felt that the damaged auxiliary engine had not provided enough impulse and decided to run it for another 25 seconds to further reduce the landing velocity.

The Soyuz 33 landed surprisingly close to the initially scheduled landing point. Rukavishnikov and Ivanov's handling of the situation received praise. The crew, however, had discarded the service module with the malfunctioning engine and the final component of the Spektar-15, an optoelectronic block, before descent. This meant that the malfunction could not be examined and a new Spektar optoelectronic block had to be produced for future missions. It was later integrated with the rest of the equipment on Salyut 6 and the Bulgarian experiments were initiated in 1981 by Soviet cosmonauts. Despite the aborted mission, Bulgaria became the fourth Interkosmos country (after Czechoslovakia, Poland and East Germany, in that order) and the sixth in the world to send a citizen in space. Ivanov's flight lasted one day, 23 hours and one minute, completing 31 orbits.

== Shipka Programme ==
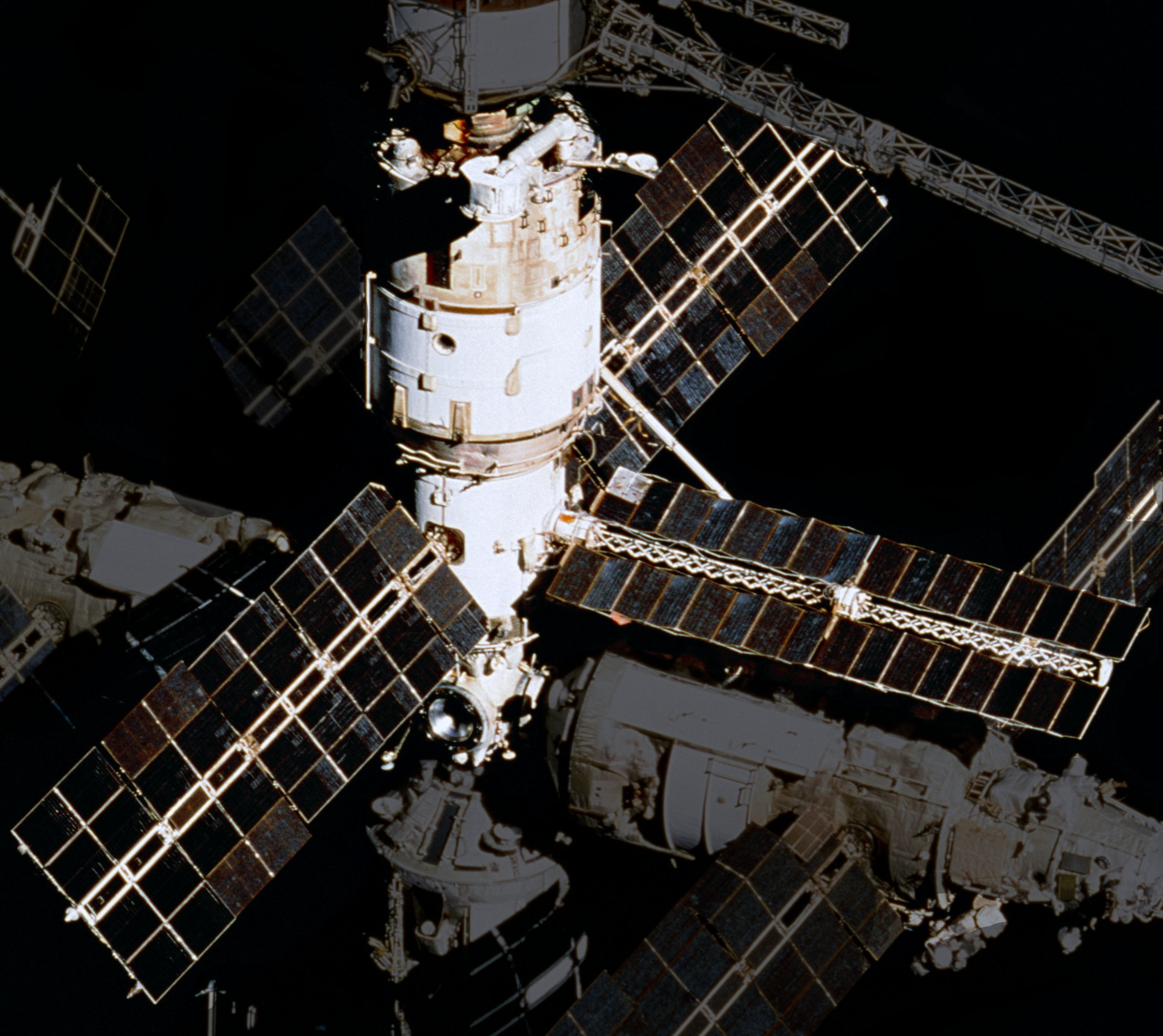
The core module of the Mir space station launched in 1986

The Mir space station core module was launched in February 1986 and the Spektar-256 system, a follow-up to the Spektar-15, was to be fitted on the station. During an official visit to the Soviet Union in 1986, Bulgarian defence minister Dobri Dzhurov arranged for a Bulgarian cosmonaut to be sent to the station with Soviet assistance. Additional talks with Glavkosmos were subsequently initiated by CLSR director Prof. Boris Bonev, and an official agreement for a joint Soviet-Bulgarian mission was signed on 22 August 1986. Although similar in arrangement to the previous Interkosmos flight, this mission was a bilateral scientific agreement independent of the Interkosmos programme. Bulgaria agreed to pay for the mission by designing and manufacturing the equipment for it, and then providing it to the Soviet Union.

Candidate selection began in November 1986 and involved more than 300 Bulgarian Air Force pilots. The flight was scheduled for the summer of 1988, and applicants with command of Russian and computer skills were given preference to speed up the selection process. Ten were selected for the final round of medical examinations by Soviet physicians in Sofia. The final four were Krasimir Stoyanov, Nikolay Raykov, Aleksandr Aleksandrov and his brother Plamen. The first three were certified for the mission. Aleksandrov and Stoyanov were selected to be the mission crew as prime and backup.

The two were sent for flight training at the Yuri Gagarin Cosmonaut Training Centre on 10 January 1987. Aleksandrov was pictured in splashdown training with Vladimir Lyakhov and Aleksandr Serebrov in November, but the crew was later announced to include Anatoly Solovyev and Viktor Savinykh instead. Lyakhov and Serebrov were assigned to the backup crew with Stoyanov. The flight and its scientific programme were named Shipka, after Shipka Pass where a crucial battle between Ottoman troops and a Bulgarian-Russian force occurred during the Liberation War of Bulgaria in 1877.

=== Experiments ===
The research schedule of the Shipka Programme encompassed five areas of study: space physics, Earth observation, space biology and medicine, materials science and space equipment. Bulgarian factories produced nine devices, each in five specimens:

- Rozhen Astronomy Complex was a computerised system consisting of a CCD camera and a data processing unit. The camera matrix had several cooling regimes each suited for a different type of observation. The data processing unit was a computer for real-time image processing. Depending on the type of astrophysical observation, it could switch between different mathematical filters to yield the maximum amount of data possible from the observed objects or phenomena in deep space. Rozhen was seen as the first step in a 15-year programme to design and build an integrated space station telescope for observations in the visible, ultraviolet and X-ray spectra.
- Paralaks-Zagorka, an image intensifier for near-Earth physics research. Designed to observe specific wavelengths (427.8 nm, dinitrogen/557.7/630 nm), its purpose was to help study the vertical distribution of atmospheric glow and the energy of charged particles. Paralaks-Zagorka was used in combination with the Rozhen Astronomy Complex.
- Terma was a high temporal and spatial resolution impulse photometer for observations of the rapidly changing optical signatures of polar aurorae, polar stratospheric clouds and lightning. Terma consisted of an optical receiver equipped with interference filters, a digital electronic unit and a control node. It was attached to a window and information received and processed by it was then transferred to the Zora computer at a rate of 20 kB/s. When coupled with Zora, Terma was mostly used to collect data on turbulence and other processes in the higher atmosphere. In combination with Paralaks-Zagorka, it was used to study polar aurorae.
- Spektar-256 built upon heritage from the Spektar-15 used on the Salyut 6, Spektar-15M on the Salyut 7 and SMP-32 on the Meteor-Priroda satellite, all designed and built under Academician Dimitar Mishev. It was a 256-channel system used to observe the reflectance of various natural and man-made objects on the Earth's surface. Like Terma, Spektar-256 was attached to one of the windows of the station and consisted of an optoelectronic block and a data processing unit. Analog information was processed into 8-bit code and then transferred to a magnetic disk.

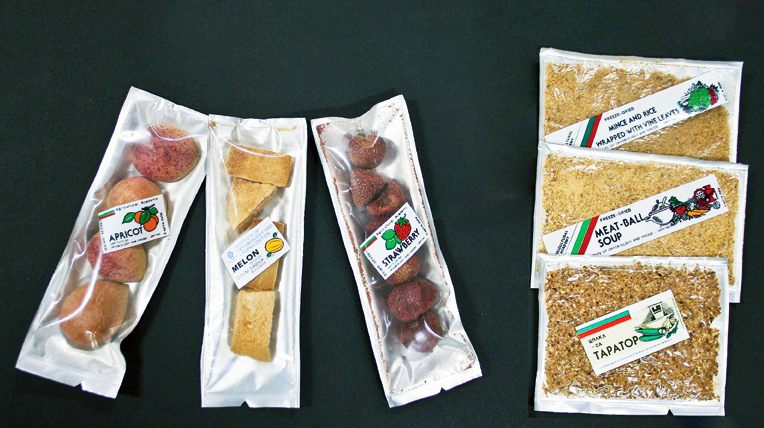
Several specimens of space food identical to those examined by Aleksandrov under the Vital experiment

- Liulin was a dosimetry instrument used to monitor radiation flux and intensity in the 100 keV to 50 MeV range on the station. This was the first iteration of the Liulin type of dosimeters.
- Doza-B was a dosimetry set of passive detectors made of biomaterials. Used to monitor radiation on the station.
- SON-3 was used to monitor circadian rhythms and sleep patterns in space conditions. It could record up to 12 hours of sleep pattern data on magnetic tape.
- Pleven 87 was an integrated set of medical instruments. Consisting of a microprocessor system, a stimulation unit and a control panel, Pleven 87 was used to perform 15 different studies on sensory and motor functions, attention dynamics during various physical or mental tasks, equanimity and operational reliability of cosmonauts. The set was entirely automated and provided visualisation of all data.
- Zora was a mission computer used to both process data from other equipment and perform additional experiments on the basis of the results. It used a principal 16-bit system and a secondary 8-bit unit to interface with the other devices, a keyboard and a plasma display.

All Bulgarian-made devices were installed on the Mir a week ahead of Aleksandrov's flight. The equipment functioned better than expected during testing. Aleksandrov later stated that computerisation of the experiments significantly increased efficiency as real-time results were generated and experiments could be performed repeatedly to verify the data. Overall, Aleksandrov was to perform dozens of research activities related to the interstellar medium, the Galactic Center of the Milky Way and nearby galaxies, orientation using stars as a reference, synthesis of materials in microgravity, crystallisation, muscular, vestibular and ocular functioning, among others. Aleksandrov also continued work on experiments scheduled for Georgi Ivanov's flight (such as Kontrast-2 and Ilyuminator-2) and examined the properties of Bulgarian-made space food.

=== Flight ===
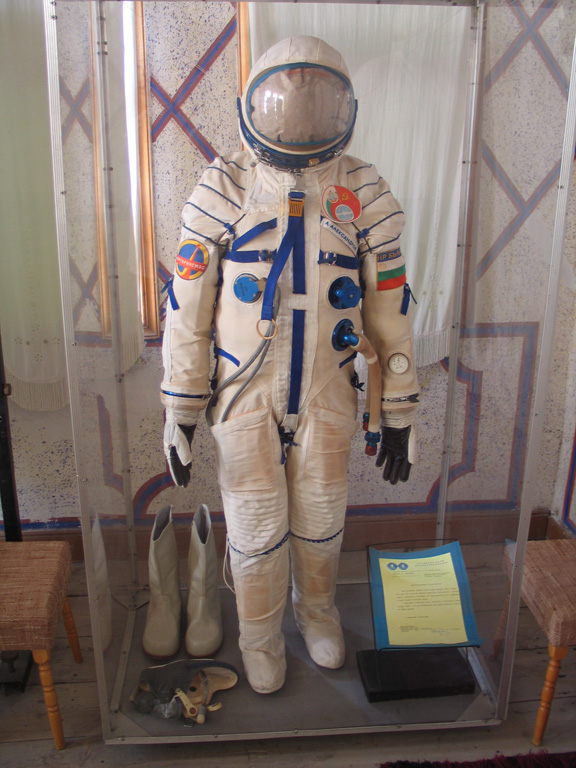
Aleksandrov's Sokol space suit

The original flight date was scheduled for 21 June 1988, but by April 1988, it was advanced to 7 June. This was caused by changes in the station's orbit by the engines of the Progress 36 resupply spacecraft. The earlier launch date would have also provided better lighting conditions for the Rozhen experiment, another factor in pulling back the launch date. The call sign of the crew was Rodnik. Flight control was provided by TsUP as well as a newly-established Situational Centre in Stara Zagora, Bulgaria.

Unlike previous launches when the event was recorded and only broadcast if successful, Aleksandrov's launch was broadcast live on Soviet television. Liftoff took place on 7 June at 18:03 Moscow time on Soyuz TM-5, with Solovyev as flight commander, Savinykh as flight engineer and Aleksandrov as research cosmonaut. At the time, the Mir was staffed by Musa Manarov and Vladimir Titov, who had been there since 21 December 1987. At 18:02:22 on 9 June, the TM-5 began approach maneuvers on its 33rd orbit. At 19:40, the TM-5 had already established radio contact and TV transmissions, and was 400 metres from the Mir. Nine minutes later, live television broadcast of the approach was initiated. The TM-5 docked with the Mir at 19:55 and began pressure equalisation at 20:12. All hatches were open at 21:25 and the Soyuz crew transferred to the Mir at 21:27.

Aleksandrov performed more than 56 experiments during his 9-day stay on the station. During the SON-K experiment, he confirmed the normal flow of all three phases of non-rapid eye movement sleep. Aleksandrov also participated in a teleconference with state leader Todor Zhivkov which was aired live on Bulgarian National Television. On the morning of 17 June, Solovyev, Savinykh and Aleksandrov began procedures to return to Earth with the Soyuz TM-4 flight. It detached from the Mir at 10:18 and initiated departure; re-entry engine firing occurred at 13:22:37 and the descent module entered the atmosphere at 13:50. The spacecraft landed at 14:13 some 205 kilometres southeast of Dzhezkazgan.

== Current status ==
Following Aleksandrov's flight, Bulgaria continued to design, produce and send equipment to the Mir space station. The Liulin class of instruments first developed for Aleksandrov's flight are now used on the International Space Station and on the ExoMars Trace Gas Orbiter. The Bulgarian SVET plant growth system later installed on the Mir was used to grow wheat and vegetables in space for the first time.

After the collapse of Communism and the severe reduction of science funding, Bulgaria's cosmonaut programme was largely shelved. Much of the infrastructure became defunct. In 2011, Georgi Ivanov urged the government to reboot the human spaceflight programme. Krasimir Stoyanov has suggested that domestic plant growth and radiation monitoring equipment could allow a Bulgarian cosmonaut to join a human mission to Mars in the future, provided there is government support.

Despite the current lack of a crewed spaceflight programme, a fully functional Soyuz-TMA training analog is operational at the Aerospace Centre and Planetarium of the Yuri Gagarin Educational Complex in Kamchiya near Varna.

== Overview ==
Mission	Launch date	Prime	Backup	Duration	Station	Experiments	Mission insignia
Soyuz 33	10 April 1979	Georgi Ivanov	Aleksandr Aleksandrov	1d 23h 01m	Salyut 6 (docking failed)	24 (not performed)	
Mir EP-2	7 June 1988	Aleksandr Aleksandrov	Krasimir Stoyanov	9d 20h 10m	Mir	>56	

== See also ==
- Bulgaria 1300
