= List of Mir visitors =

Astronauts, cosmonauts and tourists to the Russian space station

This is a list of visitors to the Mir space station in alphabetical order. Station crew names are in bold. The suffix (twice) refers to the individual's number of Mir visits, not their total number of space flights. Entries without a flag symbol indicate that the person was a citizen from the bloc of countries comprising the former Soviet Union at launch.

== Statistics ==
Between 1986 and 2000, 104 individuals visited the Mir space station. Note that this list does not double count for individuals with dual citizenship (for example, the British-American astronaut Michael Foale is only listed under the United States).

=== By nationality ===
Nationality	Trips	Fliers	Notes
Soviet Union / Russia	68	42	one woman, 35 Mir crew members, 13 double and three triple flights, one quadruple and one quintuple flight
United States	49	44	eight women, seven Mir crew members, three double flights and one triple flight
France	8	6	one woman, one Mir crew member, two double flights
Germany	4	4	one Mir crew member
Afghanistan	1	1	
Austria	1	1	
Bulgaria	1	1	
Canada	1	1	
Japan	1	1	one tourist
Slovakia	1	1	
Syria	1	1	
United Kingdom	1	1	one woman
**Total**	137	104	11 women, 44 Mir crew members, one tourist, 18 double and four triple flights, one quadruple and one quintuple flight

=== By agency ===
Agency	Trips	Fliers	Notes
Roscosmos	69	43	one woman, 35 Mir crew members, 13 double and three triple flights, one quadruple and one quintuple flight
NASA	49	44	eight women, seven Mir crew members, three double flights and one triple flight
ESA	7	6	two Mir crew members, one double flight
CNES	4	3	one woman, one double flight
Intercosmos	3	3	
CSA	1	1	
ASA	1	1	
DFVLR	1	1	
Project Juno	1	1	one woman
Tourists	1	1	
**Total**	137	104	11 women, 44 Mir crew members, one tourist, 18 double and four triple flights, one quadruple and one quintuple flight

== A ==
- **Viktor Afanasyev** (thrice)
- Thomas D. Akers (United States)
- Toyohiro Akiyama (Japan) (tourist)
- **Aleksandr Aleksandrov**
- Aleksandr Aleksandrov (Bulgaria)
- Michael P. Anderson (United States)
- Jerome Apt (United States)
- **Anatoly Artsebarsky**
- Toktar Aubakirov
- **Sergei Avdeyev** (thrice)

== B ==
- Ellen S. Baker (United States)
- Michael A. Baker (United States)
- **Aleksandr Balandin**
- Yuri Baturin
- Ivan Bella (Slovakia)
- **John E. Blaha** (United States)
- Michael J. Bloomfield (United States)
- **Nikolai Budarin** (twice)

== C ==
- Kenneth D. Cameron (United States)
- Franklin R. Chang-Diaz (United States)
- Kevin P. Chilton (United States)
- Jean-Loup Chrétien (France) (twice)
- Jean-François Clervoy (France)
- Michael R. Clifford (United States)
- Eileen M. Collins (United States)

== D ==
- **Vladimir Dezhurov**
- Bonnie J. Dunbar (United States) (twice)

== E ==
- Joe F. Edwards (United States)
- Reinhold Ewald (Germany)
- Léopold Eyharts (France)

== F ==
- Muhammed Faris (Syria)
- Klaus-Dietrich Flade (Germany)
- **Michael Foale** (United States)

== G ==
- Robert L. Gibson (United States)
- **Yuri Gidzenko** (Russia)
- Linda M. Godwin (United States)
- John M. Grunsfeld (United States)

== H ==
- Chris A. Hadfield (Canada)
- James D. Halsell (United States)
- Claudie Haigneré (France)
- **Jean-Pierre Haigneré** (twice) (France)
- Gregory J. Harbaugh (United States)

== I ==
- Marsha S. Ivins (United States)

== J ==
- Brent W. Jett (United States)

== K ==
- **Aleksandr Kaleri** (thrice)
- Janet L. Kavandi (United States)
- **Leonid Kizim**
- **Yelena Kondakova** (twice)
- **Sergei Krikalev** (twice)
- **Valery Korzun** (Russia)

== L ==
- **Aleksandr Laveykin**
- Wendy B. Lawrence (United States) (twice)
- **Aleksandr Lazutkin**
- Anatoli Levchenko
- **Jerry M. Linenger** (United States)
- Edward T. Lu (United States)
- **Shannon W. Lucid** (United States)
- Vladimir Lyakhov

== M ==
- **Yuri Malenchenko**
- **Gennadi Manakov** (twice)
- **Musa Manarov** (twice)
- William S. McArthur (United States)
- Ulf Merbold (Germany)
- Abdul Ahad Mohmand (Afghanistan)
- **Talgat Musabayev** (twice)

== N ==
- Carlos I. Noriega (United States)

== O ==
- **Yuri Onufrienko**

== P ==
- **Gennady Padalka**
- Scott E. Parazynski (United States)
- Charles J. Precourt (United States) (thrice)
- **Aleksandr Poleshchuk**
- **Valeri Polyakov** (twice)
- Dominic L. Pudwill Gorie (United States)

== R ==
- William F. Readdy (United States)
- James F. Reilly (United States)
- **Thomas Reiter** (Germany)
- **Yuri Romanenko**
- Jerry L. Ross (United States)
- Valery Ryumin

== S ==
- Viktor Savinykh
- Richard A. Searfoss (United States)
- Ronald M. Sega (United States)
- **Aleksandr Serebrov** (twice)
- Salizhan Sharipov
- Helen Sharman (United Kingdom)
- **Anatoly Solovyev** (five times)
- **Vladimir Solovyov**
- **Gennady Strekalov** (twice)

== T ==
- **Norman E. Thagard** (United States)
- **Andrew S.W. Thomas** (United States)
- **Vladimir Titov** (twice)
- Michel Tognini (France)
- **Vasili Tsibliyev** (twice)

== U ==
- **Yury Usachev** (twice)

== V ==
- Franz Viehböck (Austria)
- **Aleksandr Viktorenko** (four times)
- **Pavel Vinogradov**
- **Aleksandr Volkov** (twice)

== W ==
- Carl E. Walz (United States)
- James D. Wetherbee (United States)
- Terrence W. Wilcutt (twice) (United States)
- Peter J. K. Wisoff (United States)
- **David A. Wolf** (United States)

== Z ==
- **Sergei Zalyotin**

== See also ==
- List of astronauts by name
