= Mir EO-3 =

Third expedition to Mir space station

- Mission type: Mir expedition
- Mission duration: 365.94 days (launch to landing)

Expedition
- Space station: Mir
- Began: 21 December 1987
- Ended: 21 December 1988, 02:32:54 UTC
- Arrived aboard: Soyuz TM-4; Polyakov: Soyuz TM-6
- Departed aboard: Soyuz TM-6; Polyakov: Soyuz TM-7

Crew
- Crew size: Two
- Members: Vladimir Titov; Musa Manarov; Valeri Polyakov* * - Transferred to EO-4

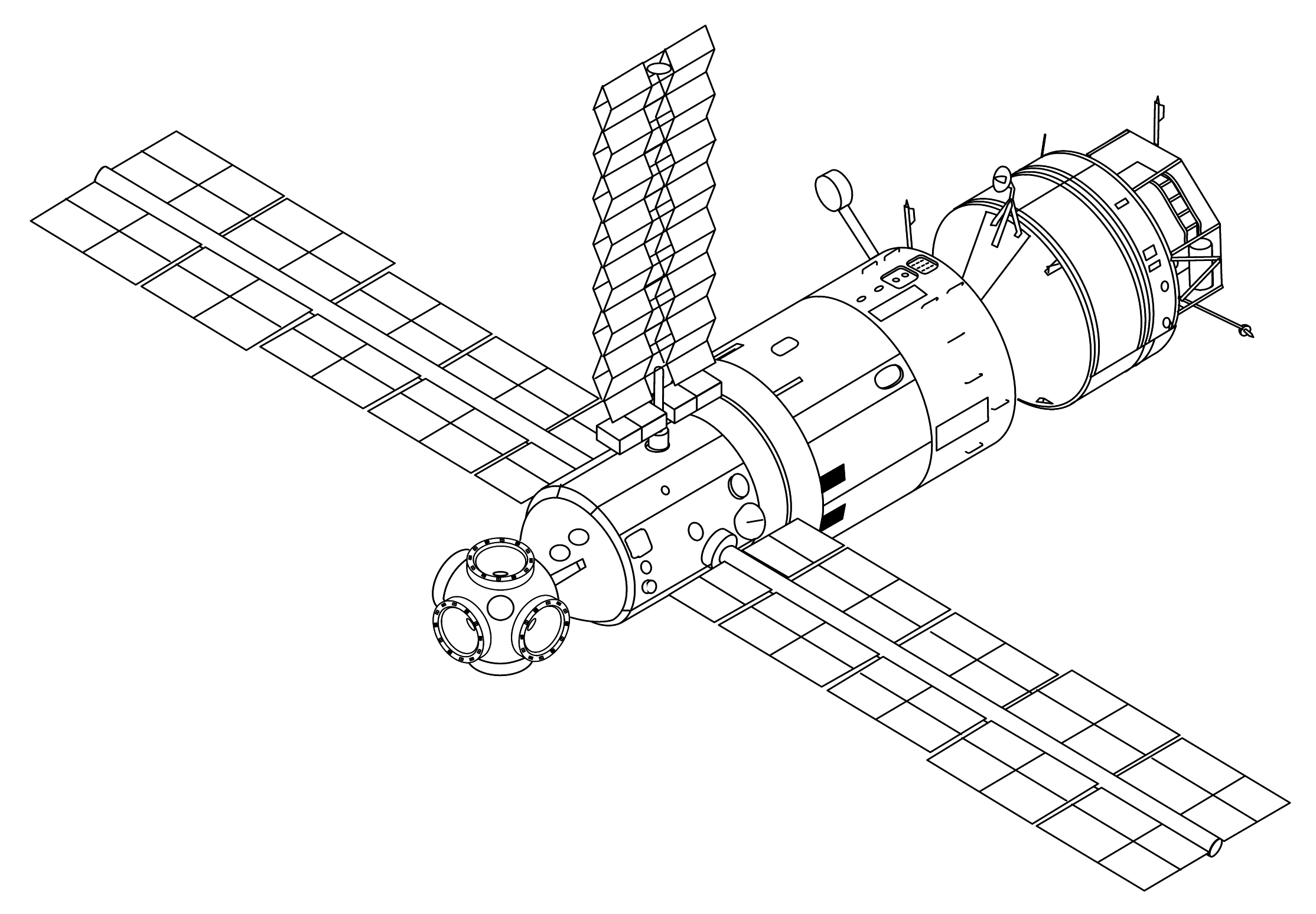
Drawing of Mir EO-3

Mir EO-3 (also called Mir Principal Expedition 3) was an expedition to the space station Mir. The crew consisted of 3 people, Musa Manarov (Commander), Vladimir Titov (Flight Engineer) and Valeri Polyakov (Research Doctor). Manarov and Titov arrived at the station in December 1987 on Soyuz TM-4, while Polyakov arrived much later, in August 1988 on Soyuz TM-6. After the arrival of Polyakov, medical experiments became more intensive.

== Crew ==
Upon docking to Mir; Titov and Manarov became the third resident crew. Both performed three EVAs. Polyakov joined the crew later separately.

Position	Name	Spaceflight	Launch	Landing	Duration	Notes
Commander	(Soviet Union) Vladimir Titov	Third	21 December 1987; Soyuz TM-4	21 December 1988; Soyuz TM-6	366 days	Record spaceflight duration
Flight Engineer	(Soviet Union) Musa Manarov	First	21 December 1987; Soyuz TM-4	21 December 1988; Soyuz TM-6	366 days	Record spaceflight duration
Research Doctor	(Soviet Union) Valeri Polyakov	First	29 August 1988; TM-6	27 April 1989; TM-7	241 days	Transferred to Mir EO-4

=== Backup crew ===
- Aleksandr Volkov (Commander)
- Aleksandr Kaleri (Flight Engineer)
- German Arzamazov (Research Doctor)

== Mission highlights ==
In the first week of the mission they performed biological experiments (with onions and fishes for example) and installed the Aynur biological crystal growth apparatus, which they had delivered to the station, into Kvant-1. Titov and Manarov conducted part of an ongoing survey of galaxies and star groups in the ultraviolet part of the spectrum using the Glazar telescope on Kvant. The survey required photography with exposure times of up to 8 minutes. Other work included Earth observation and experiments on the fields of materials sciences, meteorology, space technology, physiology, psychology, medical sciences and astronomical research, using the Marija-research apparatus. In total the crew performed over 2000 experiments.

=== Mir EP-2 ===
In June 1988, the spacecraft Soyuz TM-5 arrived at the station carrying the three-person visiting crew of Mir EP-2. The crew consisted of two Soviets, Commander Solovyev and Flight Engineer Savinykh, as well as the Bulgarian research cosmonaut Aleksandr Aleksandrov (not to be confused with Soviet cosmonaut Aleksandr Aleksandrov, who was part of the long-duration Mir EO-2 crew).

Aleksandrov was the second Bulgarian to fly in space, the first being Georgi Ivanov, who flew on Soyuz 33 but failed to reach Salyut 6 after an engine failure aborted his mission. As a result, Bulgaria was the last Eastern European Soviet ally to not have one of its citizens visit a Soviet space station. Aleksandrov became the first Bulgarian to visit a space station. During his visit, Aleksandrov used nearly 2,000 kg of equipment delivered by Progress spacecraft to conduct 46 experiments in the Shipka program.

The visiting EP-2 crew returned to Earth about a week later in the spacecraft Soyuz TM-4, leaving TM-5 as the station's lifeboat.

=== Polyakov arrives ===
On 31 August 1988, the spacecraft Soyuz TM-6 arrived at the station, carrying the new EO-3 crew member Valeri Polyakov. Also on TM-6 was the two-person crew of the visiting expedition Mir EP-3, consisting of the commander Vladimir Lyakhov, as well as the first Afghan cosmonaut Abdul Ahad Mohmand.

After about a week on the station, Lyakhov and Mohmand returned to Earth in Soyuz TM-5, leaving the fresh TM-6 spacecraft at the station as their new lifeboat. During the descent of TM-6 there were some technical problems, resulting in some tense moments as well as a day-long delay in landing. Nevertheless, they landed safely on 7 September.

=== Spacewalks ===
The first spacewalk (also known as "Extra-vehicular activity", or EVA) of EO-3 took place on 26 February 1988 (4h 25m) replacing a segment on a solar cell. The second EVA was on 30 June 1988 (5h 10m) in which the replacement of a detector block on the Kvant-1 module failed. New tools were delivered to the station and with this the same work was then successful on 20 October 1988 (4h 12m).

=== End of mission ===
Mir EO-3 officially concluded on 21 December 1988, when Manarov and Titov returned to Earth in the Soyuz TM-6 spacecraft. The mission in total lasted for 365.94 days, the third longest of all the expeditions. Polyakov stayed aboard the station, and was transferred to Mir EO-4.

== See also ==
- List of Mir Expeditions
