= Mir EP-3 =

Short-term expedition to Mir space station

- Mission type: Mir visiting crew
- Mission duration: 8.85 days (launch to landing)

Expedition
- Space station: Mir
- Began: 29 August 1988
- Ended: 7 September 1988
- Arrived aboard: Soyuz TM-6
- Departed aboard: Soyuz TM-5

Crew
- Crew size: Two
- Members: Vladimir Lyakhov; Abdul Ahad Mohmand
- Callsign: Proton

Mir EP-3 was a week-long crewed spaceflight to the Soviet space station Mir, during the long-duration expedition Mir EO-3. It was the sixth crewed spaceflight to Mir, and was launched with the spacecraft Soyuz TM-6. This spacecraft also carried Valeri Polyakov, who would stay aboard Mir after the crew of EP-3 returned to Earth in Soyuz TM-5. The crew of EP-3, also known as the Soyuz TM-6 crew, consisted of Soviet cosmonaut Vladimir Lyakhov as commander, and the first Afghan to visit space, Abdul Ahad Mohmand.

== Background ==
The nine-year Soviet–Afghan War was coming to a close, with the final troop withdrawal starting in May 1988. It was decided by the Glavcosmos chairman that the Afghan's spaceflight would be moved earlier than originally planned, so that it would occur before the Soviet military completed their withdrawal from Afghanistan.

== Crew ==
Position	Name	Spaceflight	Launch	Landing	Duration	Notes
Commander	(Soviet Union) Vladimir Lyakhov	Third	29 August 1988; Soyuz TM-6	7 September 1988; Soyuz TM-5	8.8 days	
Flight Engineer	(Afghanistan) Abdul Ahad Mohmand	First	29 August 1988; Soyuz TM-6	7 September 1988; Soyuz TM-5	8.8 days	First Afghan cosmonaut

Lyakhov had been on two spaceflight before, both of which were long-duration missions. The first was launched and landed with the spacecraft Soyuz 32, and lasted for 175 days; it was the third long-duration expedition on the space station Salyut 6, called Salyut 6 EO-3. His second spaceflight was launched and landed with the spacecraft Soyuz T-9, and lasted for 145 days; it was the second long-duration expedition aboard the space station Salyut 7, which was called Salyut 7 EO-2.

== Mission highlights ==
Mohmand's main objective was to photograph and make observations of Afghanistan from space. These photographs would be used to map the country's inaccessible mountainous regions, assess water and glacial run-off, as well as to find possible sources of oil and gas in lowland regions.

=== Problems during descent ===
Lhakhov and Mohmand depart Mir on 6 September in Soyuz TM-5. Even though the TM-5 spacecraft had only been launched a few months earlier, for Mir EP-2, it was thought to be better to leave the resident crew with the most recent Soyuz spacecraft.

During descent they suffered a computer software problem combined with a sensor problem. The deorbit engine on the TM-5 spacecraft which was to propel them into atmospheric reentry, did not behave as expected. During an attempted burn, the computer shut off the engines prematurely, believing the spacecraft was out of alignment. Lyakhov determined that they were not, in fact, out of alignment, and asserted that the problem was caused by conflicting signals picked up by the alignment sensors caused by solar glare. With the problem apparently solved, the engines were restarted two orbits later but soon shut off again. The flight director decided that they would have to remain in orbit an extra day (a full revolution of the Earth), so they could determine what the problem was. During this time it was realised that during the second attempted engine burn, the computer had tried to execute the program which was used to dock with Mir several months earlier during EP-2. After reprogramming the computer, the next attempt was successful, and the crew safely landed on 7 September.
