= Abdul Ahad Momand =

Afghan cosmonaut (1959–2026)

Colonel Abdul Ahad Momand
- عبدالاحد مومند
- Born: 1959; Sardeh Band, Andar District, Ghazni Province, Afghanistan
- Died: 21 June 2026 (aged 66–67); Stuttgart, Baden-Württemberg, Germany
- Citizenship: Afghanistan • Germany (since 2003)
- Education: Habibia High School; Kabul Polytechnic University
- Occupations: Fighter Pilot; Cosmonaut; Accountant
- Political party: PDPA
- Spouse: Zulfara
- Children: 3
- Awards: Order of Lenin; Medal "For Merit in Space Exploration"; Order of the Sun of Freedom; Order of the Saur Revolution; Hero of the Democratic Republic of Afghanistan; Hero of the Soviet Union
- Space career

Intercosmos Research Cosmonaut
- Time in space: 8d 20h 26min
- Selection: 1988
- Missions: Mir EP-3 (Soyuz TM-6/Soyuz TM-5)
- Military career
- Allegiance: Democratic Republic of Afghanistan
- Branch: Afghan Air Force
- Service years: 1978–1992
- Rank: Colonel

Abdul Ahad Momand (Pashto: عبدالاحد مومند; 1959 – 21 June 2026) was an Afghan cosmonaut and aviator. He became the first, and so far the only, Afghan citizen to journey to outer space. He was one of Soyuz TM-6's crew members and spent nine days aboard the Mir space station in 1988 as an Interkosmos research cosmonaut.

Momand is a holder of many records as an Afghan cosmonaut. He became the first person to take the Quran to space and recite it there. When he spoke to his mother on the phone from space, Pashto became the fourth language to be officially spoken in space. He became the first Afghan citizen and the fourth Muslim to visit outer space, after Sultan bin Salman Al Saud, Muhammed Faris, and Musa Manarov.

Following the collapse of Mohammad Najibullah's left-wing government, amidst the civil war that followed the Soviet withdrawal, Momand emigrated to Germany in 1992, where he was granted asylum. He subsequently lived in Ostfildern, near Stuttgart, working as a printer and as an accountant. Momand became a naturalized German citizen in 2003.

== Early years ==
Momand was born sometime in 1959 (Note: Momand's parents, like many Afghans, did not know the exact date he was born and hence indicated his date of birth as the first day of the year.) in Sardeh Band, Andar District, within the Ghazni Province of Afghanistan. He belonged to the Momand tribe of the Pashtun ethnic group. After completing his education in Habibia High School, he entered the Kabul Polytechnic University in 1976 at the age of 17, and graduated two years later before being drafted into the military in 1978.

== Career ==
Momand was then sent to the Soviet Union for pilot training. There, he studied at the Krasnodar Higher Military Aviation School of Pilots and the Kiev Higher Air Force Engineering School before returning to Afghanistan in 1981, where he rose through the ranks, becoming a chief navigator at Bagram Air Base. He returned to the Soviet Union in 1984 to train at the Gagarin Air Force Academy. Not long after graduating in 1987, he was selected as a cosmonaut candidate for the Interkosmos project. The other cosmonaut candidate sent for training was Mohammad Dawran, an Afghan MiG-21 pilot with the rank of Colonel. While Dawran had more political connections than Momand and held a higher military rank (since Momand was a captain at the time), Dawran's appendicitis was the deciding factor in Momand being chosen for the primary crew. Dawran then became part of the backup crew for Momand's mission.

Along with Commander Vladimir Lyakhov and Flight Engineer Valery Polyakov, Momand was part of the Soyuz TM-6 three-man crew, which launched at 04:23 GMT 29 August 1988. Momand's inclusion in the mission was a significant symbol during the Soviet–Afghan War.

During his nine days stay on the Mir space station in 1988, Momand took photographs of his country and participated in astrophysical, medical, and biological experiments. He also spoke to then-President Mohammad Najibullah of Afghanistan, and brewed Afghan tea for the crew. Momand was also recorded reciting the Quran in space at the request of the Afghan Government while his legs were held by another crew member outside of the shot to prevent him from floating away.

Lyakhov and Momand returned to Earth aboard Soyuz TM-5. The 6 September planned landing of Soyuz TM-5 was delayed because of mechanical complications on the Mir. Radio Moscow reassured listeners that Lyakhov and Momand were fine and in touch with Mission Control. However, their sanitation facilities were on board the jettisoned orbital module and consequently they soiled themselves during the delay. A recording, colloquially called the der’mo tape, was played of them laughing about this. A day later, the retro-fire was successful, and at 00:50 GMT Soyuz TM-5 landed near Dzhezkazgan. During touchdown, there was no live radio coverage, but only live television pictures of Mission Control.

As Momand returned to Afghanistan, he was greeted by a large crowd that threw flowers at him, as the Mujahideen fired a barrage of rockets towards the city of Kabul. The city was the site of 25 separate rocket attacks in a single day, resulting in 35 dead and 165 injured.

Momand was awarded the title of Hero of the Soviet Union on 7 September 1988 as well as the Hero of the Democratic Republic of Afghanistan and the Order of Lenin.

During his flight to space, his mother was extremely distraught over the safety of her son. President Najibullah called Momand's mother into the President's office and arranged an audio/video conference between Momand and her. By this event, Pashto became the fourth language spoken in space. On his return, he was made deputy minister of civil aviation.

Momand was in India sorting out a complaint regarding Ariana Airlines during the collapse of Najibullah's government in 1992. Momand decided to emigrate to Germany, and applied for asylum there, becoming a German citizen by naturalisation in 2003. He worked in the printing service and subsequently became an accountant residing in Ostfildern near Stuttgart. He received the Russian Medal "For Merit in Space Exploration" in 2010. He returned to Afghanistan in 2013, at the request of then-President Hamid Karzai, for the occasion of the twenty-fifth anniversary of his space mission as shown in the BBC Persian documentary “Kabul to the Galaxy” (Persian: کابل تا کهکشان, Kābul tā Kahkešān).

== Personal life and death ==
Momand was married to Zulfara and had two daughters and a son. He was fluent in four languages: Pashto, Persian, Russian and German.

Momand died of cancer in Stuttgart, Baden-Württemberg, Germany, on 21 June 2026.

== See also ==
- Afghans in Germany
- Timeline of astronauts by nationality
- List of Muslim astronauts
