= Soyuz TM-6 =

1988 Soviet crewed spaceflight to Mir

- COSPAR ID: 1988-075A
- SATCAT no.: 19443
- Mission duration: 114 days, 5 hours, 33 minutes, 49 seconds
- Orbits completed: ~1,840

Spacecraft properties
- Spacecraft: Soyuz 7K-STM No. 56
- Spacecraft type: Soyuz-TM
- Manufacturer: NPO Energia
- Launch mass: 7,070 kilograms (15,590 lb)

Crew
- Crew size: 3
- Launching: Vladimir Lyakhov; Valeri Polyakov; Abdul Mohmand
- Landing: Vladimir Titov; Musa Manarov; Jean-Loup Chrétien
- Callsign: Прото́н (Proton)

Start of mission
- Launch date: 29 August 1988, 04:23:11 UTC
- Rocket: Soyuz-U2
- Launch site: Baikonur 1/5

End of mission
- Landing date: 21 December 1988, 09:57:00 UTC
- Landing site: 160 kilometres (99 mi) SE of Dzhezkazgan

Orbital parameters
- Reference system: Geocentric
- Regime: Low Earth

Docking with Mir
- Docking date: 31 August 1988, 05:40:44 UTC
- Undocking date: 21 December 1988, 02:32:54 UTC
- Soyuz programme (Crewed missions)

Soyuz TM-6 was a crewed Soyuz spaceflight to Mir. It was launched on 29 August 1988, at 04:23:11 UTC, for the station's third long-duration expedition, Mir EO-3. The three-person crew that was launched consisted of Research Doctor Valeri Polyakov, who became part of the EO-3 crew, as well as the two crew members of the week-long mission Mir EP-3, which included the first ever Afghan cosmonaut, Abdul Ahad Mohmand.

On September 8, Soyuz TM-6 was undocked from Mir's Kvant port and redocked onto the Mir Base Block's port. It remained there until December, when it brought Titov and Manarov of the EO-3 crew back to Earth. It also landed French astronaut Jean-Loup Chrétien, ending his 25-day-long spaceflight which started with Soyuz TM-7.

== Crew ==
Position	Launching crew	Landing crew
Commander	Vladimir Lyakhov; Mir EP-3; Third and last spaceflight	Vladimir Titov; Mir EO-3; Third spaceflight
Research Doctor/Flight engineer	Valeri Polyakov; Mir EO-3 / Mir EO-4; First spaceflight	Musa Manarov; Mir EO-3; First spaceflight
Research cosmonaut	Abdul Mohmand, Afghanistan; Mir EP-3; Only spaceflight	Jean-Loup Chrétien, CNES; Mir Aragatz; Second spaceflight

Valeri Polyakov remained behind on Mir with cosmonauts Musa Manarov and Vladimir Titov when Mohmand and Lyakhov returned to Earth in Soyuz TM-5.

The crew of Soyuz TM-6 had a unique makeup, with a commander (Vladimir Lyakhov) who had been trained to fly a Soyuz-TM solo in the event a rescue ship needed to be sent to recover two cosmonauts from Mir, no flight engineer, and two inexperienced cosmonaut-researchers. One was Valeri Polyakov, who would remain aboard Mir with Titov and Manarov to monitor their health during the final months of their planned year-long stay. The other was Intercosmos cosmonaut Abdul Ahad Mohmand, from Afghanistan.

== Mission parameters ==
- Mass: 7070 kg
- Perigee: 195 km
- Apogee: 228 km
- Inclination: 51.6°
- Period: 88.7 minutes
