= Soyuz TM-7 =

1988 Soviet crewed spaceflight to Mir

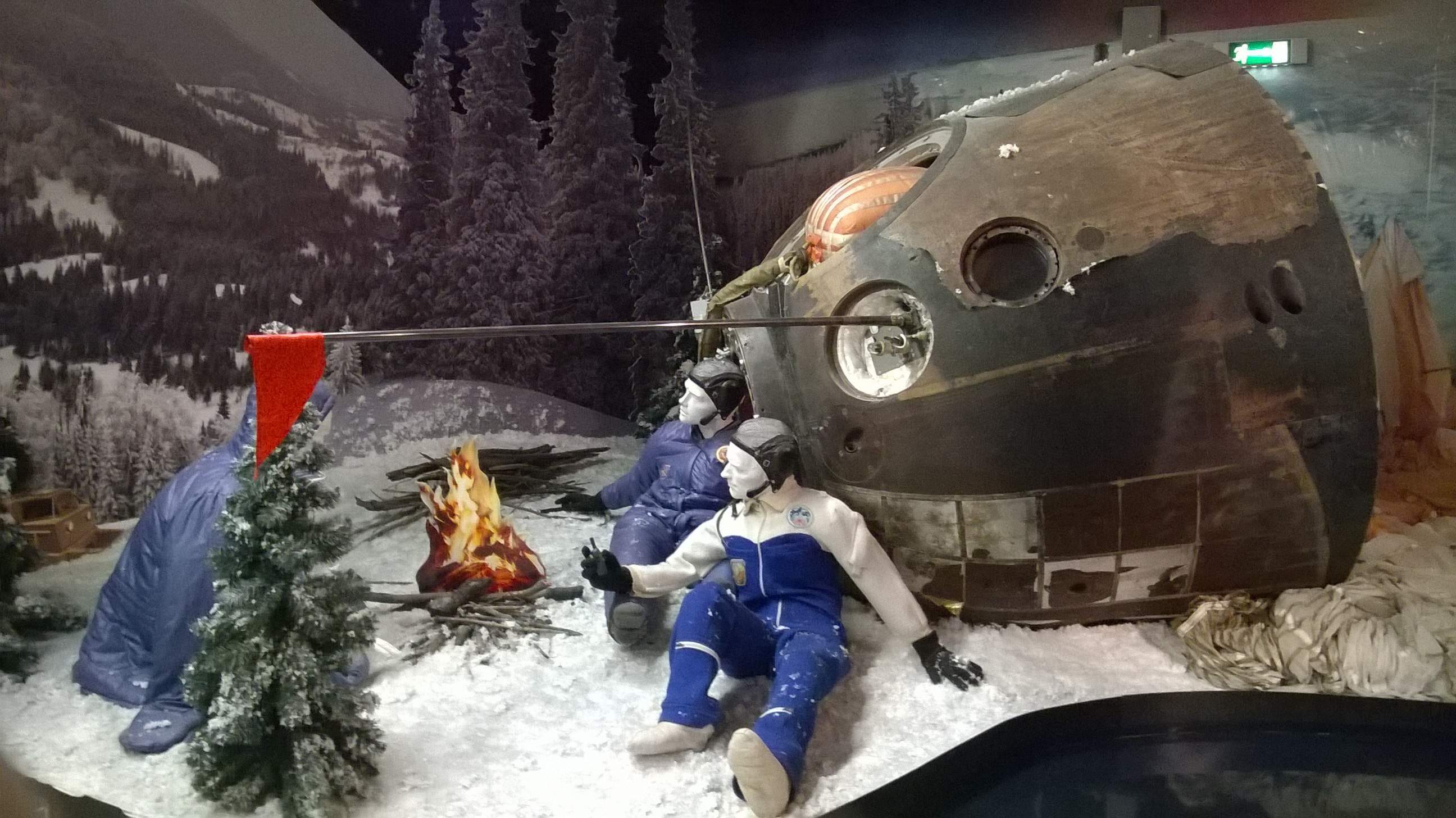
- COSPAR ID: 1988-104A
- SATCAT no.: 19660
- Mission duration: 151 days, 11 hours, 8 minutes, 24 seconds
- Orbits completed: ~2,450

Spacecraft properties
- Spacecraft: Soyuz 7K-STM No. 57
- Spacecraft type: Soyuz-TM
- Manufacturer: NPO Energia
- Launch mass: 7,000 kilograms (15,000 lb)

Crew
- Crew size: 3
- Members: Alexander Volkov; Sergei Krikalev
- Launching: Jean-Loup Chrétien
- Landing: Valeri Polyakov
- Callsign: Донба́сс (Donbass)

Start of mission
- Launch date: 26 November 1988, 15:49:34 UTC
- Rocket: Soyuz-U2
- Launch site: Baikonur 1/5

End of mission
- Landing date: 27 April 1989, 02:57:58 UTC
- Landing site: 140 kilometres (87 mi) NE of Dzhezkazgan

Orbital parameters
- Reference system: Geocentric
- Regime: Low Earth
- Perigee altitude: 194 kilometres (121 mi)
- Apogee altitude: 235 kilometres (146 mi)
- Inclination: 51.6 degrees
- Period: 88.8 minutes

Docking with Mir
- Docking date: 28 November 1988, 17:15:00 UTC
- Undocking date: 26 April 1989, 23:28:01 UTC
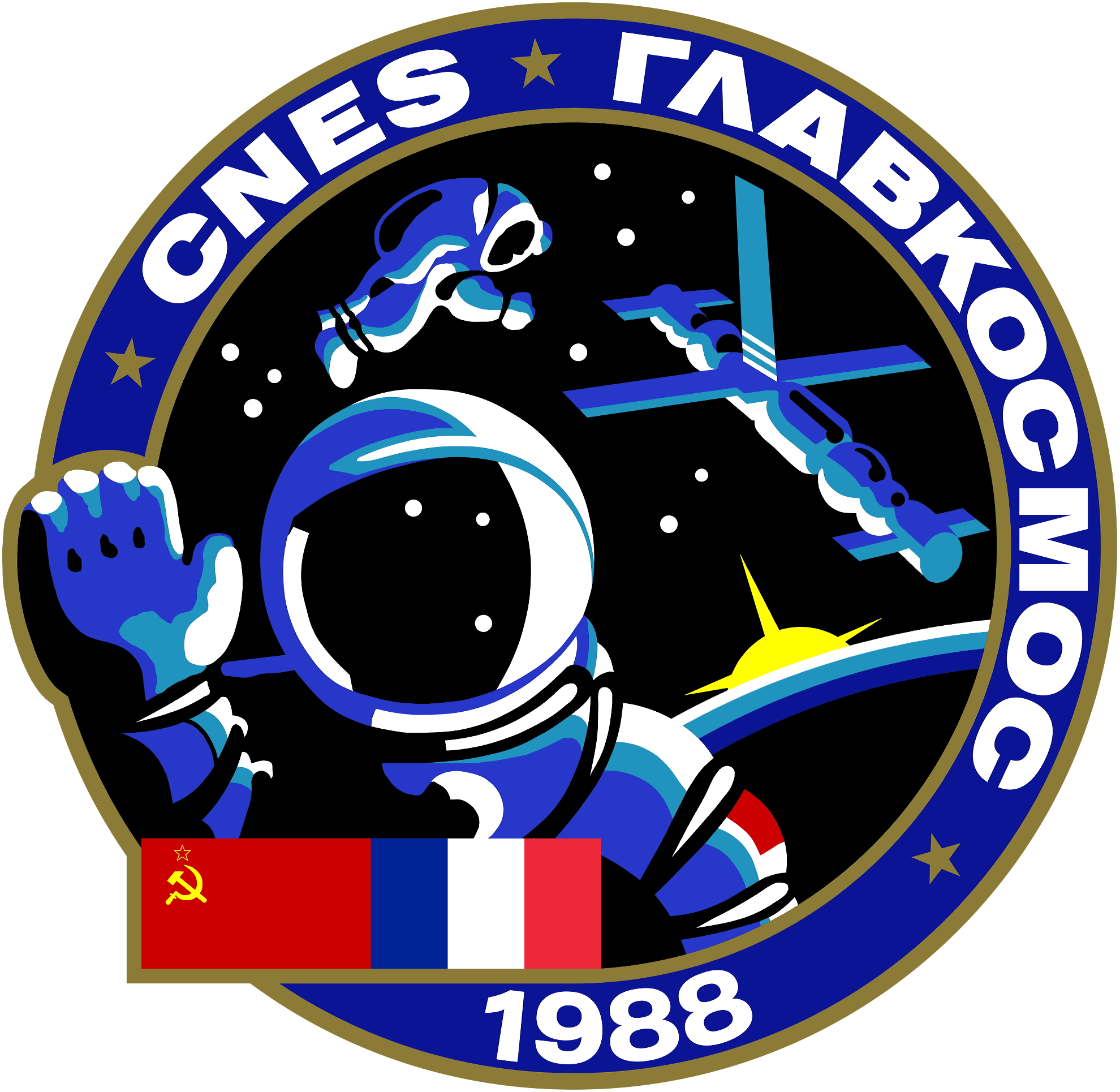
- Soyuz programme (Crewed missions)

Soyuz TM-7 was a crewed Soyuz spaceflight to Mir. It launched on 26 November 1988, at 15:49:34, and was the start of the fourth long duration expedition to Mir, Mir EO-4. The crew would join the third crew member of EO-4, cosmonaut/physician Valeri Polyakov, who was on Mir for the second half of EO-3. Also launched by Soyuz TM-7 was French astronaut Jean-Loup Chrétien, who would take part in the 24-day French mission known as Mir Aragatz. The spacecraft Soyuz TM-7 remained docked to Mir for the duration of EO-4. At the end of EO-4 in April 1989, due to delays in the launch schedule, Mir was left uncrewed, and all three EO-4 crew members were transported back to Earth.

== Crew ==
Position	Launching crew	Landing crew
Commander	Alexander Volkov; Mir EO-4; Second spaceflight	
Flight engineer	Sergei Krikalev; Mir EO-4; First spaceflight	
Research cosmonaut	Jean-Loup Chrétien, CNES; Mir Aragatz; Second spaceflight	Valeri Polyakov; Mir EO-3 / Mir EO-4; First spaceflight

== Backup crew ==
- Aleksandr Viktorenko
- Aleksandr Serebrov
- Michel Tognini

== Mission parameters ==
- Mass: 7,000 kg 15,400 lb
- Perigee: 194 km (120 mi)
- Apogee: 235 km (146 mi)
- Inclination: 51.6°
- Period: 88.8 minutes

== Mission highlights ==
The original launch date of November 21 was moved back to permit French president François Mitterrand to view the launch, which was also attended by David Gilmour and Nick Mason of Pink Floyd, who made an audio recording of the event for potential use in a future project. The spacecraft arrived at the Mir station carrying a three-man crew, including French cosmonaut Chrétien on his second flight into space. Titov, Manarov, and Chrétien returned to Earth in Soyuz TM-6. Alexander Volkov, Sergei Krikalev, and Valeri Polyakov remained aboard Mir. On 1989 April 28, they left Mir in mothballs and returned to Earth in Soyuz-TM 7. The Soyuz-TM land landing system is effective at reducing velocity in the vertical direction. However, according to cosmonaut Sergei Krikalev, winds at the landing site often impart considerable horizontal velocity. During the rough landing, Krikalev suffered a minor injury to his knee.

Preparations for the first EVA involving a non-Soviet/non-U.S. space traveler forced the cosmonauts to cut short a TV meeting with diplomats from 47 countries on December 8. On December 9, Chrétien and Volkov depressurized the multiport docking adapter and clambered outside Mir. Chrétien was first out. He installed handrails, then attached the 15.5 kg (34 lb) Échantillons experiment rack to the handrails by springs and hooks. He also attached electrical wires leading from the rack to Mir's power supply. Échantillons carried five technological experiments with applications to the Hermes shuttle program. Volkov and Chrétien then assembled the 240 kg (530 lb) experimental deployable structure (known as ERA). They attached a mount to handrails on the frustum linking the multiport docking unit to the small-diameter portion of the work compartment. After resolving problems with cables linking ERA to a control panel inside Mir, they attached the folded ERA structure to a support arm on the platform. The structure was designed to unfold to form a flat six-sided structure 1 metre deep by 3.8 metres across. From inside Mir, Krikalev commanded the structure to unfold, but to no avail. Volkov then kicked ERA, causing it to unfold properly. According to Krikalev, taking the ERA outside helped relieve the crowding problems. The EVA lasted 5 hours and 57 minutes.

The crew took with them a cassette of Pink Floyd's newly released live album Delicate Sound of Thunder (minus the cassette box, for weight reasons) and played it in orbit; this was claimed by David Gilmour to have been the first rock music recording in space. The tape was left on Mir when the mission crew returned to Earth.
