= Soyuz TM-4 =

1987 Soviet crewed spaceflight to Mir

- COSPAR ID: 1987-104A
- SATCAT no.: 18699
- Mission duration: 178 days, 22 hours, 54 minutes, 29 seconds
- Orbits completed: ~2,890

Spacecraft properties
- Spacecraft: Soyuz 7K-STM No. 54
- Spacecraft type: Soyuz-TM
- Manufacturer: NPO Energia
- Launch mass: 7,070 kilograms (15,590 lb)

Crew
- Crew size: 3
- Launching: Vladimir Titov; Musa Manarov; Anatoli Levchenko
- Landing: Anatoly Solovyev; Viktor Savinykh; Aleksandr Aleksandrov
- Callsign: Okean (Ocean)

Start of mission
- Launch date: 21 December 1987, 11:18:03 UTC
- Rocket: Soyuz-U2
- Launch site: Baikonur 1/5

End of mission
- Landing date: 17 June 1988, 10:12:32 UTC
- Landing site: 180 kilometres (110 mi) SE of Dzhezkazgan

Orbital parameters
- Reference system: Geocentric
- Regime: Low Earth
- Perigee altitude: 337 kilometres (209 mi)
- Apogee altitude: 357 kilometres (222 mi)
- Inclination: 51.6 degrees
- Period: 91.5 minutes

Docking with Mir
- Docking date: 23 December 1987, 12:51:00 UTC
- Undocking date: 17 June 1988, 06:20:50 UTC
- Soyuz programme (Crewed missions)

Soyuz TM-4 was a crewed Soyuz spaceflight to Mir. It was launched on 21 December 1987, and carried the first two crew members of the third long duration expedition, Mir EO-3. These crew members, Vladimir Titov and Musa Manarov, would stay in space for just under 366 days, setting a new spaceflight record. The third astronaut launched by Soyuz TM-4 was Anatoli Levchenko, who returned to Earth about a week later with the remaining crew of Mir EO-2. Levchenko was a prospective pilot for the Soviet Space shuttle Buran. The purpose of his mission, named Mir LII-1, was to familiarize him with spaceflight.

It was the fourth Soyuz TM spacecraft to be launched (one of which was uncrewed), and like other Soyuz spacecraft, it was treated as a lifeboat for the station's crew while docked. In June 1988, part way through EO-3, Soyuz TM-4 was swapped for Soyuz TM-5 as the station's lifeboat. The mission which swapped the spacecraft was known as Mir EP-2, and had a three-person crew.

== Crew ==
Position	Launching crew	Landing crew
Commander	Vladimir Titov; Mir EO-3; Second spaceflight	Anatoly Solovyev; Mir EP-2; First spaceflight
Flight engineer	Musa Manarov; Mir EO-3; First spaceflight	Viktor Savinykh; Mir EP-2; Third and last spaceflight
Research cosmonaut	Anatoli Levchenko; Mir LII-1; Only spaceflight	Aleksandr Aleksandrov, Bulgaria; Mir EP-2; Only spaceflight

Titov and Manarov were members of the long duration mission Mir EO-3, and returned to Earth just over a full year later, in Soyuz TM-6. Levchenko, on the other hand, returned to Earth about a week later in Soyuz TM-3.

In June 1988, Soyuz TM-4 landed the three-man crew of Mir EP-2, after their 9-day stay on the station; that crew included the second Bulgarian astronaut Aleksandr Panayotov Aleksandrov.

=== Backup crew ===
Position	Crew
Commander	Aleksandr Volkov
Flight engineer	Aleksandr Kaleri
Research cosmonaut	Aleksandr Shchukin

== Mission parameters ==
- Mass: 7070 kg
- Perigee: 337 km
- Apogee: 357 km
- Inclination: 51.6°
- Period: 91.5 minutes

== Mission highlights ==
Fourth crewed spaceflight to Mir. Manarov and Titov (known by their callsign as the "Okeans") replaced Romanenko and Alexandrov. Anatoli Levchenko was a cosmonaut in the Buran shuttle program. Levchenko returned with Romanenko and Alexandrov in Soyuz TM-3.

Before departing Mir, Romanenko and Alexandrov demonstrated use of EVA equipment to the Okeans. The Okeans delivered biological experiments, including the Aynur biological crystal growth apparatus, which they installed in Kvant-1. The combined crews conducted an evacuation drill, with the Mir computer simulating an emergency.

Titov and Manarov conducted part of an ongoing survey of galaxies and star groups in the ultraviolet part of the spectrum using the Glazar telescope on Kvant. The survey required photography with exposure times up to 8 min. Even small cosmonaut movements could shake the complex. This produced blurring of astronomical images, so all cosmonaut movements had to be stopped during the exposures.
