= Bulgarian Astronautical Society =

Organization

- Abbreviation: BAS
- Formation: December 8, 1957; 68 years ago
- Type: NGO
- Key people: Docho Haralampiev (founder)
- Website: bad1957.org

The Bulgarian Astronautical Society (Bulgarian: Българско астронавтическо дружество) is the oldest entity in Bulgaria dedicated to space exploration and space advocacy.

The Society's founders, Bulgarian Air Force Captain Docho Haralampiev and engineer Georgi Asparuhov, wanted to introduce the wider public to the benefits of space exploration after the launch of Sputnik 1. Haralampiev also sought to raise awareness about the potential of human spaceflight. The two initiated a series of meetings with Bulgarian Army generals, pilots, aviation doctors, engineers, Bulgarian Communist Party members and Bulgarian Academy of Sciences representatives.

The Society was established on 8 December 1957, two months after the launch of Sputnik 1. Its ranks swelled when numerous engineers and volunteers joined the organisation just days after its establishment. Because of the rigid legal environment in the People's Republic of Bulgaria at the time, the Society was established as an Astronautics Section of the Defence Assistance Organisation.

It joined the International Astronautical Federation in 1958.

== See also ==
- List of astronomical societies
