= Aleksandr Panayotov Aleksandrov =

Bulgarian cosmonaut (1951–2026)

Aleksandr Aleksandrov
- Александър Александров
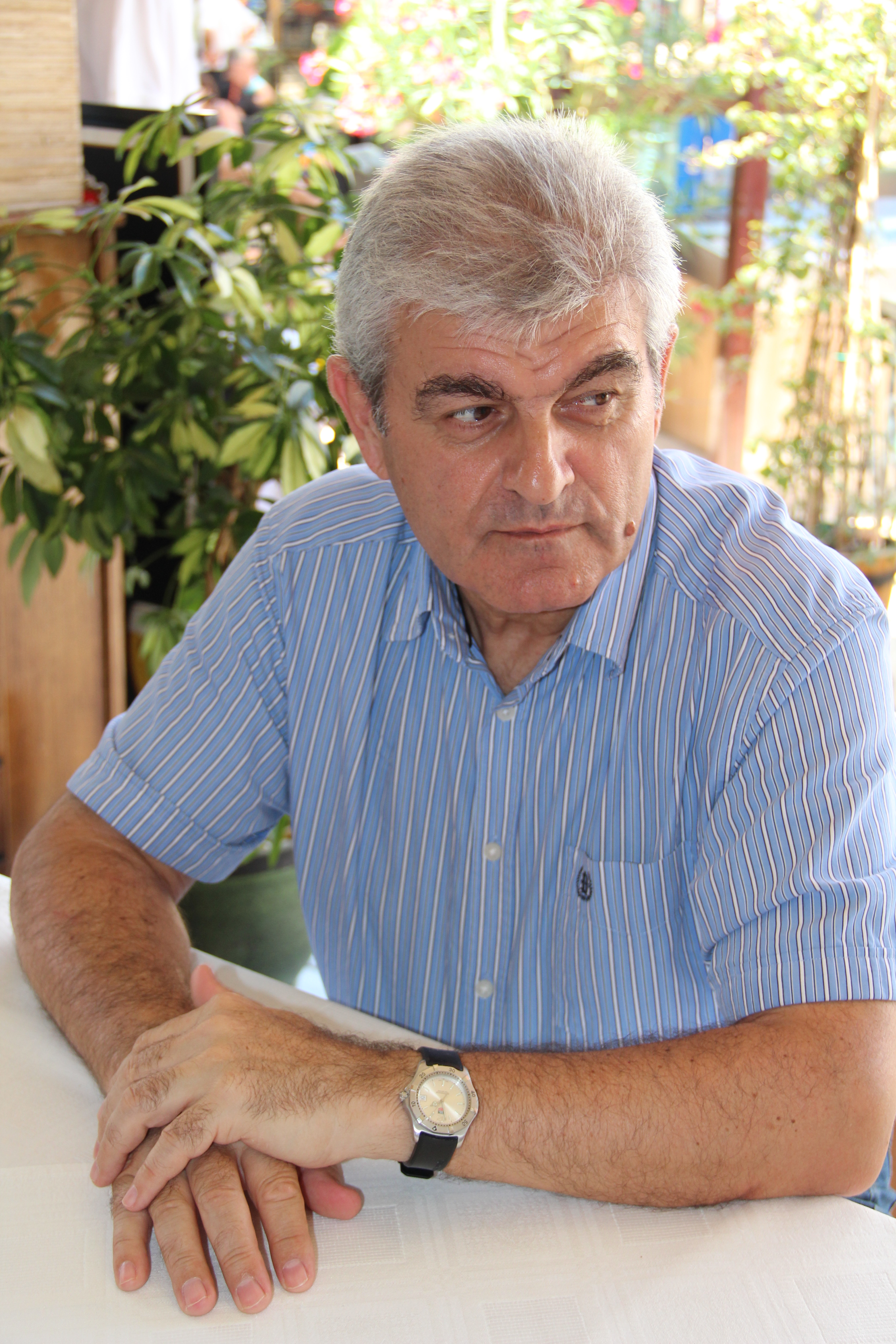
- Aleksandrov in 2013
- Born: 1 December 1951; Omurtag, Targovishte Oblast, Bulgaria
- Died: 10 July 2026 (aged 74)
- Occupation: Pilot
- Awards: Hero of the People's Republic of Bulgaria; Hero of the Soviet Union
- Space career

Intercosmos Cosmonaut
- Rank: Lieutenant colonel, Bulgarian Air Force
- Time in space: 9d 20h 10m
- Selection: 1978 Intercosmos Group
- Mission: Mir EP-2 (Soyuz TM-5, Soyuz TM-4)

Aleksandr Panayotov Aleksandrov (Bulgarian: Александър Панайотов Александров; 1 December 1951 – 10 July 2026) was a Bulgarian cosmonaut. He was the second Bulgarian to reach outer space, after Georgi Ivanov.

== Biography ==
Aleksandrov was born in Omurtag, Bulgaria on 1 December 1951. He graduated from the Bulgarian Air Force Academy in 1974 and obtained a degree in technical sciences in 1983. In the Bulgarian Air Force, Aleksandrov rose to the rank of lieutenant colonel.

He was selected as a research cosmonaut on 1 March 1978, as part of the Soviet Union's Intercosmos program. The selection featured six semifinalists, including the parachute jump record holder, Chavdar Djurov, who was killed during the selection process. Aleksandrov was selected as backup to Georgi Ivanov on the Soyuz 33 mission to the Salyut 6 space station. Subsequently, Aleksandrov was assigned to the prime crew of the Soyuz TM-5 mission to the Mir space station.

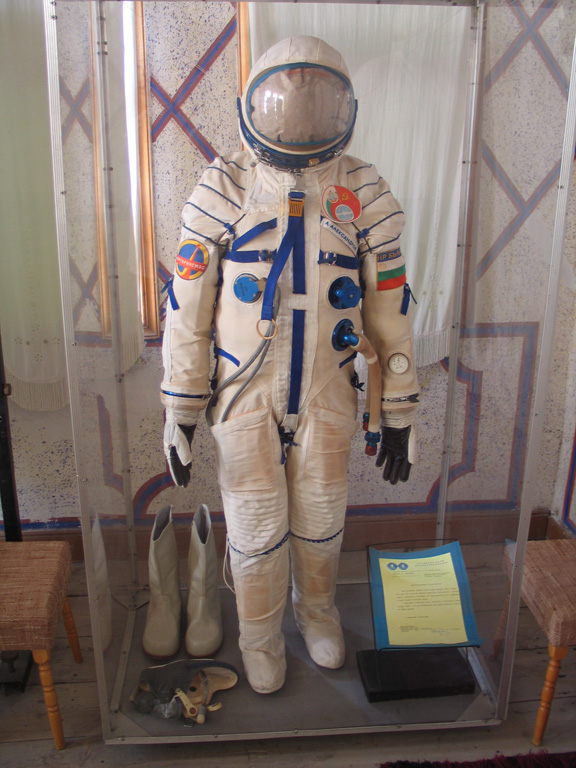
Aleksandrov's space suit

On 7 June 1988, Aleksandrov launched aboard TM-5 as a research cosmonaut along with mission commander Anatoly Solovyev and Viktor Savinykh. Upon arriving at Mir, Aleksandrov became the first Bulgarian to reach a Soviet space station, as the Soyuz 33 mission carrying Georgi Ivanov failed to reach the Salyut 6 space station. On 17 June, Aleksandrov returned aboard Soyuz TM-4 along with his fellow crew members. He, along with his crew-mates, spent just under 10 days in space.

Aleksandrov later became Deputy Director of the Institute of Space Research, Bulgarian Academy of Sciences.

He also worked as a research scientist.

Aleksandrov was married and had one child. He died on 10 July 2026, at the age of 74.

== Honours and awards ==
- Hero of the People's Republic of Bulgaria (1988)
- Hero of the Soviet Union (1988)
- Order of Georgi Dimitrov
- Order of Lenin (1988)
- Order of Stara Planina (2003), first class, on the 15th anniversary of the second Soviet-Bulgarian flight
- Military Pilot First Class
- Pilot-Cosmonaut of Bulgaria
- Medal "For Merit in Space Exploration" (12 April 2011) – for outstanding contribution to the development of international cooperation in crewed space flight

== See also ==
- Bulgarian cosmonaut program
