= Mir EP-2 =

Short-term expedition to Mir space station

- Mission type: Mir visiting crew
- Mission duration: 9.84 days (launch to landing)

Expedition
- Space station: Mir
- Began: 7 June 1988
- Ended: 17 June 1988
- Arrived aboard: Soyuz TM-5
- Departed aboard: Soyuz TM-4

Crew
- Crew size: Three
- Members: Anatoly Solovyev; Viktor Savinykh; Aleksandr Aleksandrov
- Callsign: Родни́к (Rodnik- Spring)
- Mir Visiting Expeditions

Mir EP-2 was a visiting expedition to the Mir space station conducted in June 1988 by cosmonauts Anatoly Solovyev, Viktor Savinykh and Aleksandr Aleksandrov. Launched aboard the Soyuz TM-5 spacecraft, the crew spent ten days in space before returning to Earth aboard Soyuz TM-4. The mission occurred while the EO-3 crew were aboard Mir.

Solovyev commanded the mission, with Savinykh as his flight engineer, while Bulgarian Aleksandr Panayatov Aleksandrov flew as a research cosmonaut. Aleksandrov was the second Bulgarian to fly in space, the first being Georgi Ivanov, who flew on Soyuz 33. Ivanov failed to reach the Salyut 6 space station as his mission was aborted prior to docking due to an engine failure aboard his spacecraft Soyuz 33. As a result, prior to EP-2, Bulgaria was the only Eastern European Soviet ally to not have one of its citizens visit a Soviet space station.

== Crew ==
Mir EP-2	Name	Spaceflight	Launch	Landing	Duration
Commander	(Soviet Union) Anatoly Solovyev	First	7 June 1988; Soyuz TM-5	17 June 1988; Soyuz TM-4	9.8 days
Flight Engineer	(Soviet Union) Viktor Savinykh	Third	7 June 1988; Soyuz TM-5	17 June 1988; Soyuz TM-4	9.8 days
Research cosmonaut	(Bulgaria) Aleksandr Aleksandrov	First	7 June 1988; Soyuz TM-5	17 June 1988; Soyuz TM-4	9.8 days

== Experiments ==
During his visit, Aleksandrov used nearly 2,000 kg of equipment delivered by Progress spacecraft to conduct 46 experiments in the Shipka programme.

== Landing ==
The visiting EP-2 crew returned to Earth about a week later in the spacecraft Soyuz TM-4, leaving TM-5 as the station's lifeboat.
