= Anatoly Solovyev =

Soviet-Russian cosmonaut and test pilot (born 1948)

- Анатолий Соловьёв
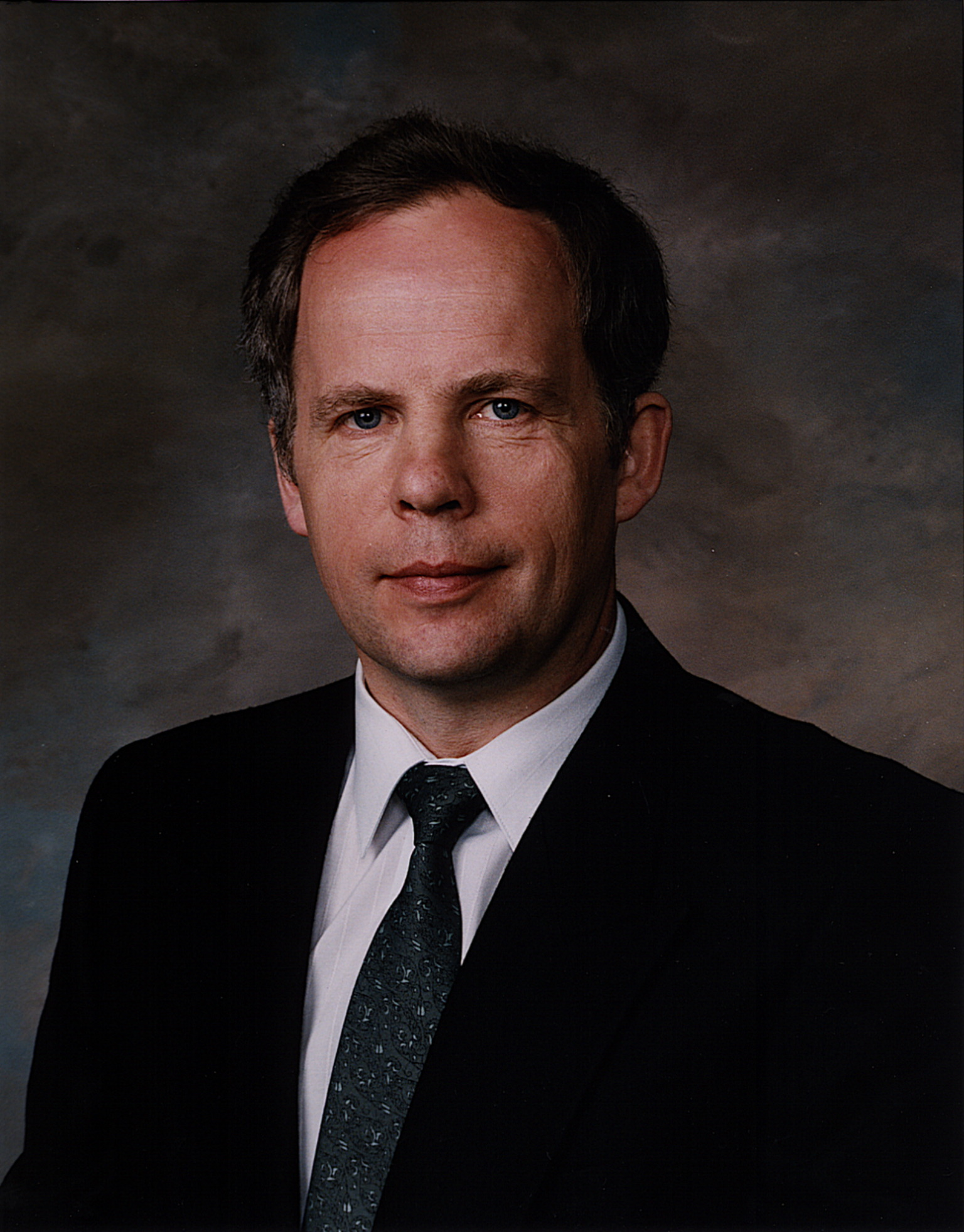
- Solovyev in 1994
- Born: January 16, 1948 (age 78); Riga, Latvian SSR, Soviet Union
- Occupation: Test pilot
- Space career

Roscosmos cosmonaut
- Status: Retired
- Rank: Colonel, Russian Air Force
- Time in space: 651 days, 2 hours
- Selection: Air Force Group 6 (1976)
- Total EVAs: 16
- Total EVA time: 82 hours, 21 minutes
- Missions: Soyuz TM-5/TM-4 (Mir EP-2); Soyuz TM-9 (Mir EO-6); Soyuz TM-15 (Mir EO-12); STS-71/Soyuz TM-21 (Mir EO-19); Soyuz TM-26 (Mir EO-24)

Anatoly Yakovlevich Solovyev (Russian: Анатолий Яковлевич Соловьёв; Latvian: Anatolijs Solovjovs; alternate spelling "Solovyov"; born 16 January 1948) is a retired Russian and Soviet cosmonaut and pilot. Solovyev holds the world record on the number of spacewalks performed (16) and accumulated time spent spacewalking (over 82 hours).

== Education ==
Solovyev studied at Riga Secondary School No. 33. After completing secondary school in Riga at age 16, he was a general labourer at a building materials factory, and then a metalworker. He completed two years of evening school and in 1967, enrolled at the Faculty of Physics and Mathematics of the State University of Latvia. After completing the first year, Anatoly left training to prepare for aviation school while working as a locksmith at the Latvian Joint Aviation Unit. In 1968 Solovyov began his training at the Chernigov Higher Military Aviation School.

== Military service ==
He enrolled as a cadet in the Chernigov Higher Military School of Pilots in 1968. He joined the CPSU in 1971. He graduated from the Lenin Komsomol Chernigov Higher Military Aviation School in 1972, having flown the L-29, MiG-15UTI and MiG-21. Subsequently, he was assigned to a reconnaissance air regiment in the Far East Aviation District, flying the MiG-21R. In 1975 he was awarded the qualification "Military Pilot 1st Class".

== Cosmonaut ==
He was selected for Cosmonaut training 23 August 1976 as a member of TsPK-6. Uniquely, this group was to train as pilots for the Buran programme (Soviet "space shuttle"), and as such had to also qualify as test pilots. To do so the group first attended the 267th Centre for Testing Aviation Equipment and Training Test Pilots at Akhtubinsk where they passed as test pilots (third class). This was followed up by a year's training to qualify as Cosmonauts. They then returned to Akhtubinsk for further training as test pilots (second class). In addition he qualified as a parachutist and diver. In January 1979 he was appointed as a Test Cosmonaut in OK CPC (aerospace vehicles) working on Buran.

Delays with Buran and increased need for space station crews resulted in his transferring to training for the Interkosmos programme in January 1982. The following year he was designated as a reserve crew commander for missions to Salyut 7, with Aleksandr Serebrov and Nikolai Moskalenko. In 1985 he was assigned as reserve crew commander of Soyuz T-15 with Viktor Savinykh. The following year he was assigned as back up commander of the Soyuz TM-3 mission to Mir with Savinykh and Munir Habib (Syria).

He was commander for the 9-day Mir EP-2 visiting ("lifeboat" swap) crew June 1988 launched aboard Soyuz TM-5 and returned aboard Soyuz TM-4. His crew were Viktor Savinykh and Aleksandr Aleksandrov (of Bulgaria). He thus became the 65th Soviet Cosmonaut with the personal callsign "Spring".

He then served as the back up commander for Soyuz TM-8. Commander 179 day Soyuz TM-9/Mir EO-6 long-duration mission February to August 1990, with Aleksandr Balandin. This included an EVA to repair thermal blankets on Soyuz TM-9, and a second EVA when repairs to the Kvant-2 module hatch were unsuccessfully attempted.

He served as reserve crew commander with Andrei Zaytsev for Mir EO-10 but the crew was disbanded after flight programme changes. He was back up commander Mir EO-11/Soyuz TM-14.

He was commander for the 188-day Mir EO-12/Soyuz TM-15 with Sergei Avdeyev, from July 1992 until February 1993. He conducted four more EVAs during the mission. Launching only with them was Michel Tognini of France.

He served as back up commander of Mir EO-18, and then as commander of Mir EO-19 with Nikolai Budarin. They launched as passengers aboard Space Shuttle Atlantis on the STS-71 mission in June 1995. This was at the first Orbiter docking with Mir, and the EO-19 crew undocked Soyuz TM-21 briefly to observe and photograph the departure of Atlantis. Solovyev also performed three EVAs. They returned to Earth aboard Soyuz TM-21 in September after 75 days.

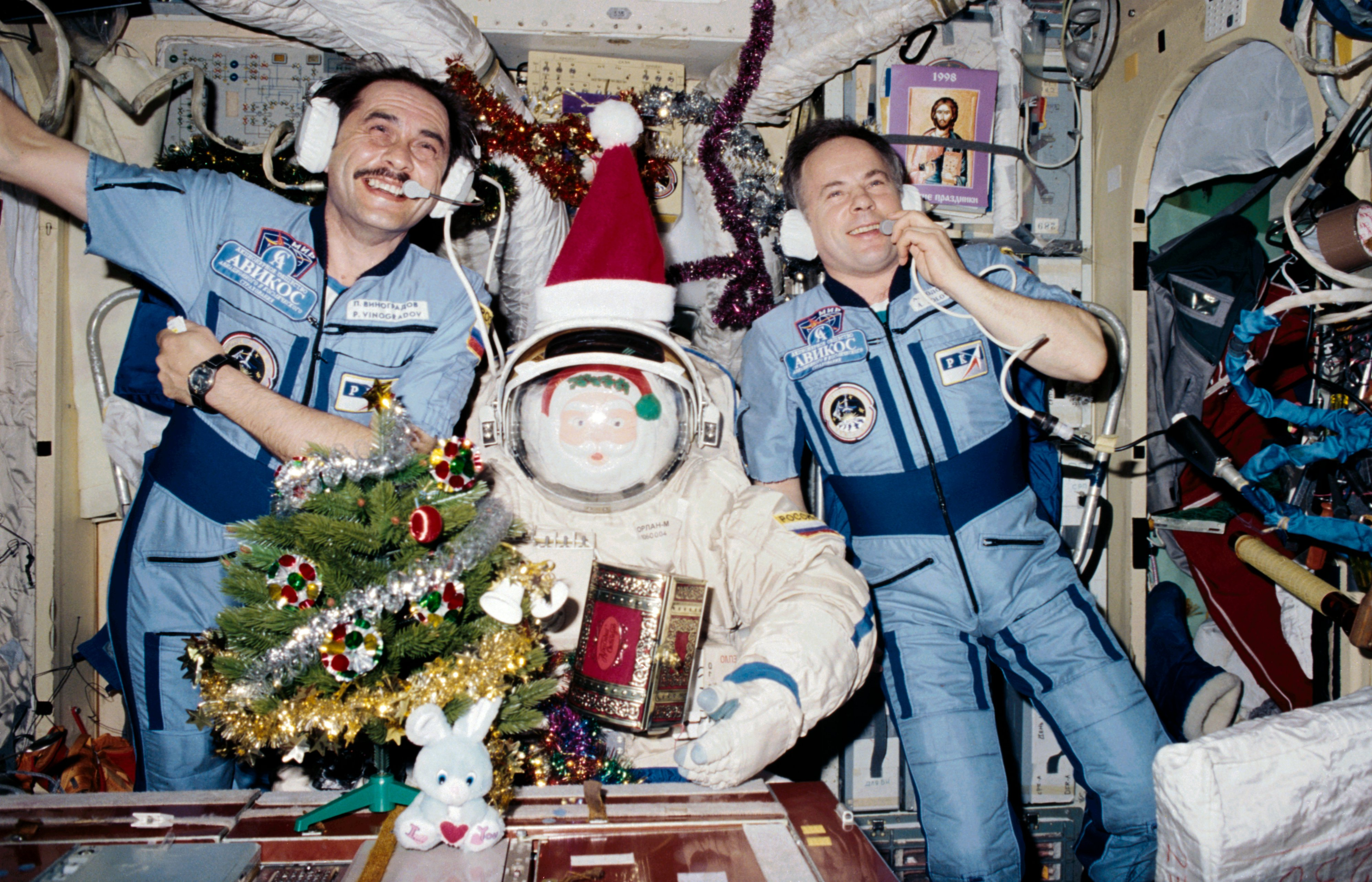
Pavel Vinogradov (left) and Solovyev (right) celebrate Christmas in 1997 during Mir EO-24

His final space mission was as commander of Mir EO-24/Soyuz TM-26 for 197 days from August 1997 until February 1998 with Pavel Vinogradov. After an automatic Kurs approach, Solovyev performed the final docking manually when he was unable to verify the accuracy of the automatic targeting. They joined NASA astronaut Michael Foale who transferred from EO-23 until his departure aboard Atlantis. He was replaced by David Wolf and then Andrew Thomas who remained to join EO-25. His first EVA on 22 August 1997 was an unusual "internal spacewalk" to connect power and survey damage to the depressurised Spektr module. This had been holed in the collision with Progress M-34 on 25 June. Solovyev performed six more EVAs to set a world record total of 16, with a world record combined duration of 82 hours 21 minutes. He commented:

"It just came about. I never referred to my numbers as a record, nor did I ever think about beating someone else's accomplishments before going out on a walk."

He was tapped to be on the crew of the first expedition to occupy the International Space Station. However he declined to serve under an American commander for the long-duration mission, since his experience of long-duration spaceflight far exceeded that of any American astronaut.

Solovyev left the Cosmonaut Detachment in 1999 having reached compulsory retirement age and became the president of "For the Good of the Fatherland", a national organisation recognising the work of Russians devoted to cultural and social development.

== Family ==
Solovyev's parents are Yakov Mikhailovich Solovyev (father), deceased in 1980 and Antonia Pavlovna Soloveva, who resides in Riga. He is married to Natalya Vasilyevna Solovyeva (née Katyshevtseva), with whom he has two sons, Gennady (born 1975), Illya (1980). Solovyev resides in Star City.

== Awards and honors ==
- Hero of the Soviet Union (USSR);
- Pilot-Cosmonaut of the USSR (USSR);
- Order For Merit to the Fatherland 2nd and 3rd classes;
- Order of Lenin (USSR);
- Order of the October Revolution (USSR);
- Order of Friendship of Peoples (USSR);
- Medal "For Merit in Space Exploration".

Foreign awards:

- Hero of the People's Republic of Bulgaria;
- Order of Georgi Dimitrov (Bulgaria);
- Officer of the Legion of Honour (France);
- Order of Stara Planina (Republic of Bulgaria);
- two NASA Space Flight Medals.

== In media ==
- The 2013 film Gravity features a fictional character, STS-157 Commander Colonel Matthew "Matt" Kowalski (played by George Clooney), who repeatedly mentions his desire to beat Solovyev's record using a Manned Maneuvering Unit.
