= Valeri Polyakov =

Soviet and Russian cosmonaut (1942–2022)

- Валерий Поляков
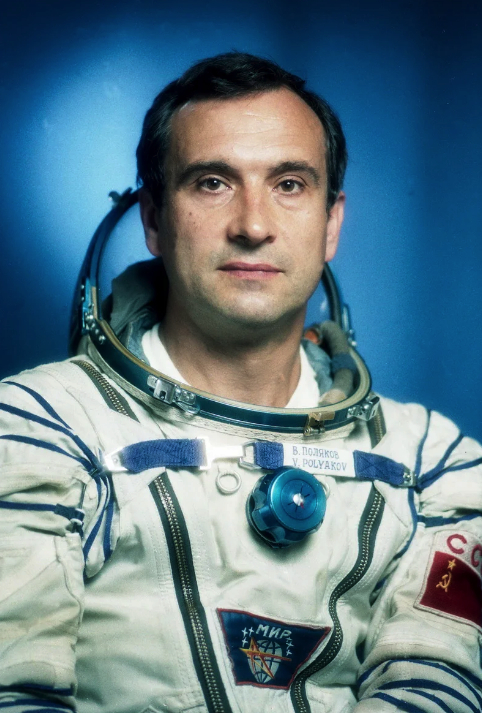
- Born: Valeri Ivanovich Korshunov; 27 April 1942; Tula, Russian SFSR, Soviet Union
- Died: 7 September 2022 (aged 80); Moscow, Russia
- Occupation: Physician
- Awards: See below
- Space career

Roscosmos cosmonaut
- Time in space: 678 days, 16 hours, 33 minutes, 18 seconds
- Selection: Medical Group 3 (1972)
- Mission: Soyuz TM-6/TM-7 (Mir EO-3/4); Soyuz TM-18/TM-20 (Mir EO-15/16/17)
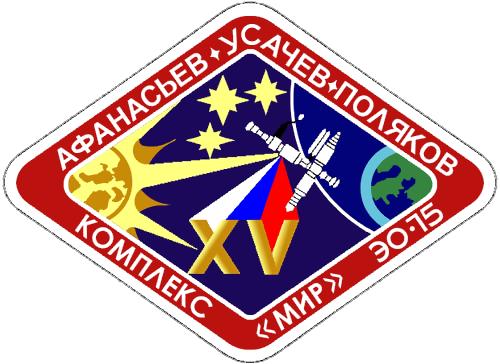
- Mission insignia

Valeri Vladimirovich Polyakov (Russian: Валерий Владимирович Поляков, IPA: [vɐˈlʲerʲɪj vlɐˈdʲimʲɪrəvʲɪtɕ pəlʲɪˈkof]; born Valeri Ivanovich Korshunov [Валерий Иванович Коршунов]; 27 April 1942 – 7 September 2022) was a Soviet and Russian cosmonaut. He is the record holder for the longest single stay in space, staying aboard the Mir space station for more than 14 months (437 days, 18 hours) during one trip. His combined space experience was more than 22 months.

Selected as a cosmonaut in 1972, Polyakov made his first flight into space aboard Soyuz TM-6 in 1988. He returned to Earth 240 days later aboard TM-7. Polyakov completed his second flight into space in 1994–1995, spending 437 days in space between launching on Soyuz TM-18 and landing with TM-20, setting the record for the longest time continuously spent in space by an individual.

== Early life ==
Polyakov was born in Tula in the USSR on 27 April 1942. Born Valeri Ivanovich Korshunov, Polyakov legally changed his name after being adopted by his stepfather in 1957. He was educated at the Tula Secondary School No. 4, from which he graduated in 1959.

He enrolled in the I. M. Sechenov 1st Moscow Medical Institute, where he graduated with a doctoral degree. Afterwards, he enrolled in the Institute of Medical and Biological Problems, Ministry of Public Health, Moscow, where he specialized in astronautics medicine. Polyakov dedicated himself to the field of space medicine in 1964 after the flight of the first physician in space, Boris Yegorov, aboard Voskhod 1.

== Cosmonaut career ==
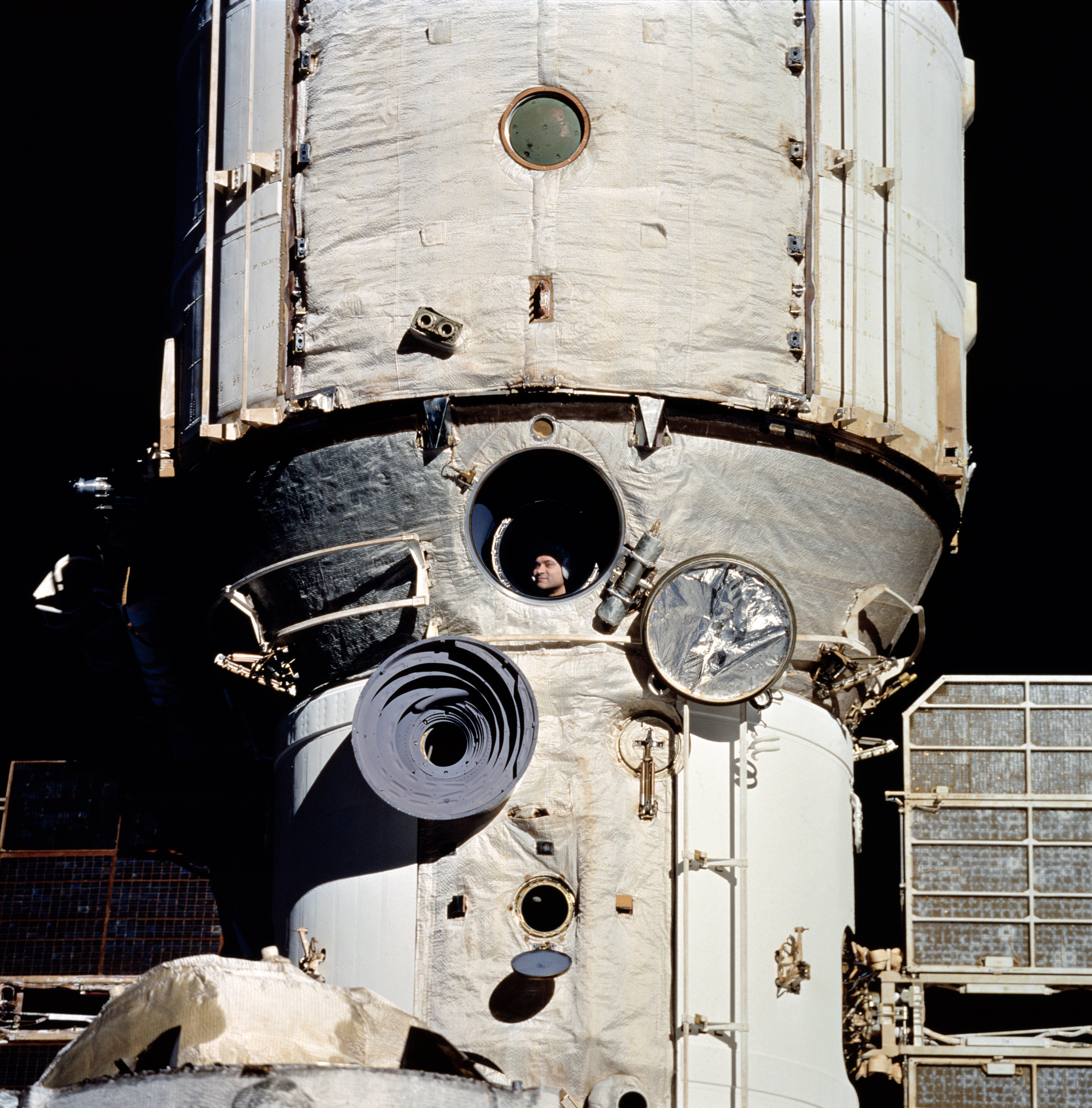
Polyakov observes rendezvous operations with the Space Shuttle Discovery on its STS-63 mission through a window on the Mir Core Module in February 1995.

Polyakov was selected as a cosmonaut in Medical Group 3 on 22 March 1972. His first flight into space occurred on Soyuz TM-6 in 1988. After staying aboard the Mir space station and conducting research for 240 days, Polyakov returned to Earth aboard Soyuz TM-7. His first words upon return were "We can fly to Mars."

Polyakov's second spaceflight, the longest human spaceflight in history, began on 8 January 1994 with the launch of the Soyuz TM-18 mission. He spent approximately 437 days aboard Mir, conducting experiments and performing scientific research. During this flight, he completed just over 7,000 orbits of the Earth. On 9 January 1995, after 366 days in space, Polyakov formally broke the spaceflight duration record previously set by Vladimir Titov and Musa Manarov six years earlier. He returned to Earth aboard Soyuz TM-20 on 22 March 1995. Upon landing, Polyakov opted not to be carried the few feet between the Soyuz capsule and a nearby lawn chair, instead walking the short distance. In doing so, he wished to prove that humans could be physically capable of working on the surface of Mars after a long-duration transit phase.

Polyakov volunteered for his 437-day flight to learn how the human body would respond to the micro-gravity environment on long-duration missions to Mars. Upon returning from his second spaceflight, Polyakov held the record for the most total time in space. Data from Polyakov's flight has been used by researchers to determine that humans are able to maintain a healthy mental state during long-duration spaceflight just as they would on Earth.

Polyakov underwent medical assessments before, during, and after the flight. He also underwent two follow-up examinations six months after returning to Earth. When researchers compared the results of these medical exams, it was revealed that although there were no impairments of cognitive functions, Polyakov experienced a clear decline in mood as well as a feeling of increased workload during the first few weeks of spaceflight and return to Earth. Polyakov's mood stabilized to pre-flight levels between the second and fourteenth month of his mission. It was also revealed that Polyakov did not suffer from any prolonged performance impairments after returning to Earth. In light of these findings, researchers concluded that a stable mood and overall function could be maintained during extended duration spaceflights, such as crewed missions to Mars.

=== Spaceflights ===
- Soyuz TM-6 / Soyuz TM-7 – 29 August 1988, 04:23:11 UTC to 27 April 1989, 02:57:58 UTC – 240 days, 22 hours, 34 minutes and 47 seconds
- Soyuz TM-18 / Soyuz TM-20 – 8 January 1994, 10:05:34 UTC to 22 March 1995, 04:04:05 UTC – 437 days, 17 hours, 58 minutes and 31 seconds

== Later life ==
Polyakov retired from his position as a cosmonaut in June 1995, with a total of just over 678 days in space. He participated in experiment SFINCSS-99 (Simulation of Flight of International Crew on Space Station) in 1999. Polyakov was the Deputy Director of the Ministry of Public Health in Moscow, where he oversaw the medical aspects of long-duration space missions. He was a member of the Russian Chief Medical Commission, participating in the qualification and selection of cosmonauts. He also held membership in the International Space Researchers' Association and the International Academy of Astronautics. Polyakov was married and had one child.

After returning from space, Polyakov remained active in the discipline of international spaceflight, becoming a "cosmonaut-investigator" for the United States, Austria, Germany, and France during their respective space science missions to the Mir space station. He died on 7 September 2022 at the age of 80.

== Legacy ==
Polyakov won several awards for his spaceflight and academic achievements, including the Hero of the Soviet Union, Hero of the Russian Federation, Order of Lenin, Order of the Legion of Honour, and the Order of Parasat. He was a member of organizations related to astronautics, including the Russian Chief Medical Commission on cosmonauts' certification.

Polyakov held the title of "Pilot-Cosmonaut of the USSR" and published several works pertaining to life sciences, medical aspects of space missions, and the results of research conducted on long-duration spaceflights.

Polyakov's record for longest cumulative time in space of 678 days over two missions stood until surpassed in 1999 by cosmonaut Sergei Avdeyev with a total of 747 days in space during three different missions.

== Honours and awards ==
- Hero of the Russian Federation
- Hero of the Soviet Union
- Hero of the Democratic Republic of Afghanistan
- Officer of the Legion of Honour (France)
- Order of Lenin
- Pilot-Cosmonaut of the USSR
- Prince of Asturias Award (now renamed Princess of Asturias Awards, Spain)
- Order of Parasat (Kazakhstan)
- Order of The Saur Revolution (Afghanistan)
- Order of the Sun of Freedom (Afghanistan)

== See also ==
- List of Heroes of the Russian Federation
- Human spaceflight
- List of spaceflight records
