= Soyuz TM-5 =

1988 Soviet crewed spaceflight to Mir

- COSPAR ID: 1988-048A
- SATCAT no.: 19204
- Mission duration: 91 days, 10 hours, 46 minutes, 25 seconds
- Orbits completed: ~1,475

Spacecraft properties
- Spacecraft: Soyuz 7K-STM No. 55
- Spacecraft type: Soyuz-TM
- Manufacturer: NPO Energia
- Launch mass: 7,000 kilograms (15,000 lb)

Crew
- Crew size: 3 up 2 down
- Launching: Anatoly Solovyev; Viktor Savinykh; Aleksandr Aleksandrov
- Landing: Vladimir Lyakhov; Abdul Ahad Mohmand
- Callsign: Родни́к (Rodnik- Spring)

Start of mission
- Launch date: 7 June 1988, 14:03:13 UTC
- Rocket: Soyuz-U2
- Launch site: Baikonur 1/5

End of mission
- Landing date: 7 September 1988, 00:49:38 UTC
- Landing site: 202 kilometres (126 mi) SE of Dzhezkazgan

Orbital parameters
- Reference system: Geocentric
- Regime: Low Earth
- Perigee altitude: 173 kilometres (107 mi)
- Apogee altitude: 241 kilometres (150 mi)
- Inclination: ~51.6 degrees
- Period: 88.6 minutes

Docking with Mir
- Docking date: 9 June 1988, 15:57:10 UTC
- Undocking date: 5 September 1988, 23:54:57 UTC
- Soyuz programme (Crewed missions)

Soyuz TM-5 was a crewed Soyuz spaceflight to Mir. It was launched on June 7, 1988, carrying the Mir EP-2 mission's three-person crew. This week-long stay on Mir occurred during the third long-duration Mir expedition, Mir EO-3. The crew of EP-2 returned to Earth aboard Soyuz TM-4, while the TM-5 spacecraft remained docked to Mir, acting as the lifeboat for the long-duration crew. On September 7, 1988, the TM-5 spacecraft undocked from Mir, and landed Mir EP-3 mission's two-person visiting crew. The de-orbit procedures for Soyuz were revised after this flight, as multiple issues almost prevented the descent module's safe de-orbit and landing.

== Crew ==
Position	Launching crew	Landing crew
Commander	Anatoly Solovyev; Mir EP-2; First spaceflight	Vladimir Lyakhov; Mir EP-3; Third and last spaceflight
Flight engineer	Viktor Savinykh; Mir EP-2; Third and last spaceflight	None
Research cosmonaut	Aleksandr Aleksandrov, Bulgaria; Mir EP-2; Only spaceflight	Abdul Ahad Mohmand, Afghanistan; Mir EP-3; Only spaceflight
Aleksandrov was the first Bulgarian cosmonaut to visit a space station. Mohmand was the first Afghan cosmonaut.

== Launch ==
Soyuz TM-5 launched on 1988 June 7 and arrived at Mir on June 9 carrying the second Bulgarian in space, Alexandrov (not to be confused with the Soviet cosmonaut of the same name). He became the first Bulgarian to reach a Soviet space station (Georgi Ivanov failed to reach Salyut 6 on Soyuz 33 in 1979—Alexandrov was his backup). Their launch had been advanced by 2 weeks late in the planning stages to improve lighting conditions for the Rozhen astronomical experiment.

== Landing ==
On September 5 cosmonauts Lyakhov and Mohmand undocked from Mir. They jettisoned the orbital module and made ready for deorbit burn to return to Earth. During descent, the spacecraft experienced a computer software problem combined with a sensor problem. This caused their landing to be delayed by a full day. The Descent Module, where they spent this 24-hour period, had no sanitary facilities. Consequently, they soiled themselves. They would not have been able to redock with Mir because they had discarded the docking system along with the orbital module. Reentry occurred as normal on September 7. Following this incident, the Soviets decided that on future missions, they would retain the orbital module until after deorbit burn, as they had done on the Soyuz Ferry flights.
