= Vladimir Lyakhov =

Soviet cosmonaut (1941–2018)

- Владимир Ляхов; Володимир Ляхов
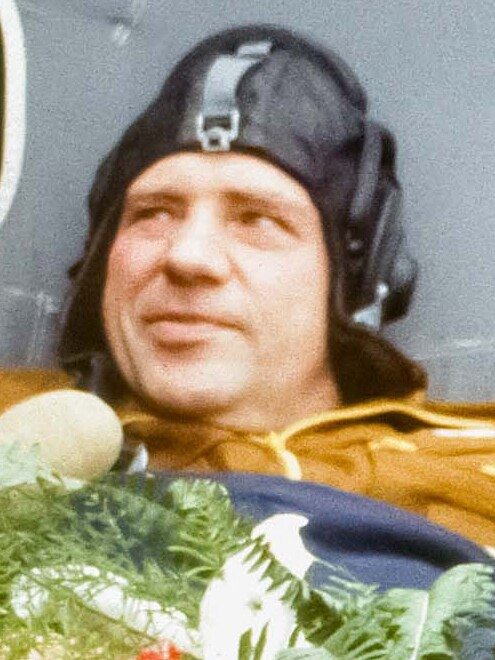
- Lyakhov in 1983
- Born: Vladimir Afanasyevich Lyakhov; 20 July 1941; Antratsyt, Ukrainian SSR, Soviet Union
- Died: 19 April 2018 (aged 76); Astrakhan, Russia
- Occupation: Pilot
- Awards: Hero of the Soviet Union
- Space career

Cosmonaut
- Rank: Colonel, Soviet Air Force
- Time in space: 333d 07h 47m
- Selection: Air Force Group 4
- Missions: Soyuz 32/Soyuz 34, Soyuz T-9, Mir EP-3 (Soyuz TM-6/Soyuz TM-5)

Vladimir Afanasyevich Lyakhov (Ukrainian: Володимир Афана́сійович Ляхов; Russian: Влади́мир Афана́сьевич Ля́хов; 20 July 1941 – 19 April 2018) was a Ukrainian Soviet cosmonaut.

He was selected as cosmonaut on 5 May 1967, and retired on 7 September 1994. Lyakhov was the Commander on Soyuz 32, Soyuz T-9, and Soyuz TM-6, and spent 333 days, 7 hours, 47 minutes in space. He was married and had two children.

Lyakhov's flight to Salyut-6 with Valeri Ryumin as the Soyuz 32 crew resulted in setting a space endurance record of 175 days when they returned to Earth on 19 August 1979.

Lyakhov conducted three spacewalks for a cumulative total of 7 hours and 8 minutes with one outside of Salyut 6 and two outside of Salyut 7.

Lyakhov was deputy director for cosmonaut training and deputy commander of the cosmonaut corps at the Gagarin Cosmonaut Training Center. He retired in 1994. He was twice awarded the Order of Lenin and was twice named a Hero of the Soviet Union. He was also named a Hero of the Democratic Republic of Afghanistan and awarded with the Order of the Saur Revolution and Order of The Sun of Freedom.
