= Viktor Savinykh =

Soviet cosmonaut (born 1940)

- Виктор Савиных
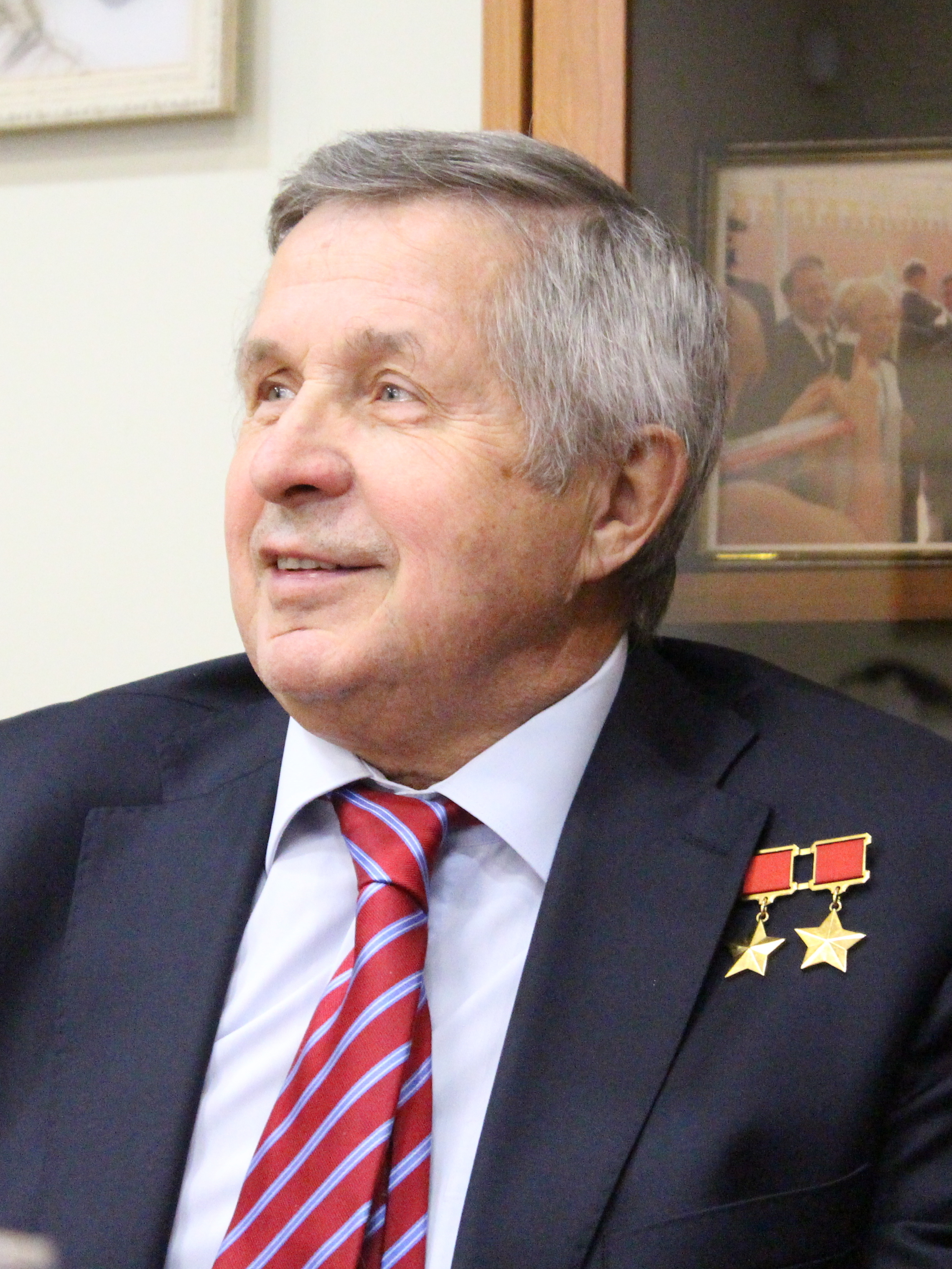
- Savinykh in 2016
- Born: 7 March 1940 (age 86); Beryozkiny, Orichevsky District, Kirov Oblast, USSR
- Occupation: Flight engineer
- Awards: Hero of the Soviet Union (twice); Order "For Merit to the Fatherland"
- Space career

Cosmonaut
- Status: Retired
- Time in space: 252d, 13h, 47m, 23s
- Selection: 1978 Intercosmos Group
- Total EVAs: 1 (during Salyut 7 EO-4-1a)
- Total EVA time: 5h
- Missions: Soyuz T-4 (Salyut 6 EO-6), Soyuz T-13 / Soyuz T-14 (Salyut 7 EO-4-1a), Mir EP-2 (Soyuz TM-5 / Soyuz TM-4)

Viktor Petrovich Savinykh (born 7 March 1940) is a Soviet cosmonaut, scientist, and organizer of personnel training in the higher education system. Selected as a cosmonaut on 1 December 1978, he flew as Flight Engineer on Soyuz T-4, Soyuz T-13 and Soyuz TM-5, and has spent 252 days 17 hours 38 minutes in space. Savinykh retired on 9 February 1989.

Savinykh was born in Beryozkiny, Kirov Oblast, Russian SFSR on 7 March 1940. He is married with one child. In 1989-2007 he was the rector, and since 2007 the president, of the Moscow State University of Geodesy and Cartography.

Viktor Savinykh is the author of the book Notes from a Dead Station (Савиных В. П. Записки с мертвой станции. — М.: ИД «Системы Алиса», 1999. - 88 c.) (ISBN 5-901135-01-6). (The book is dedicated to the restoration of control in 1985 over the Salyut 7 space orbital station).

In March 2011, he was elected to the Legislative Assembly of Kirov Oblast of the fifth convocation in a single constituency from the United Russia party.

== Honours and awards ==
- Twice Hero of the Soviet Union (26 May 1981 and 20 December 1985)
- Pilot-Cosmonaut of the USSR
- Hero of the Mongolian People's Republic
- Hero of the People's Republic of Bulgaria
- Full Cavalier of the Order For Merit to the Fatherland

1st class (27 February 2020)
2nd class (6 March 2000) - for outstanding achievements in scientific research and a great contribution to the preparation of highly qualified personnel
3rd class (11 November 1994) - a great service to the people associated with the development of Russian statehood, the achievements in labor, science, culture, arts, strengthening friendship and cooperation between peoples
4th class (12 December 2010) - for services to education, science and a great contribution to the training of qualified specialists

- Order of Honour (2 November 2004) - for services to the development of education and many years of diligent work
- Three Orders of Lenin
- Medal "For Merit in Space Exploration" (12 April 2011) - for the great achievements in the field of research, development and utilization of outer space, many years of diligent work, public activities
- Jubilee Medal "300 Years of the Russian Navy"
- Medal "In Commemoration of the 850th Anniversary of Moscow"
- State Prize of the Russian Federation for science and technology (18 June 1996)
- State Prize of the USSR (1989)
- Order of Stara Planina (People's Republic of Bulgaria; 9 June 2003)
- Order of Georgi Dimitrov People's Republic of Bulgaria)
- Order of Sukhbaatar (Mongolian People's Republic)
- Order of Military Glory of the Syrian Arab Republic (UAR, 1987)
- Two of the Order of "Friendship" (ATS, 1999, 2000)
- Award of the President of the Russian Federation in the field of education for 2002 (5 October 2003)
- Honored Master of Sports of the USSR (1981)
- Gold medal of the Tsiolkovsky Academy of Sciences of the USSR (1986) - for outstanding contribution to space exploration
- Doctor of Technical Sciences, Professor, Academician of the Russian Academy of Sciences (2019)

Honorary citizen of Kaluga, Perm, Kirov, Dzhezkazgan (Kazakhstan), Ulaanbaatar, Darkhan (Mongolia).

In 2005, minor planet 6890 was named after Savinykh.
