= Musa Manarov =

Soviet engineer and cosmonaut (born 1951)

- Муса Манаров
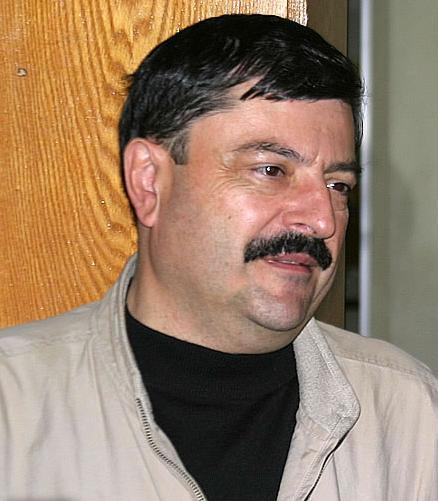
- Born: 22 March 1951 (age 75); Baku, Azerbaijan SSR, Soviet Union (now Azerbaijan)
- Occupation: Flight engineer
- Awards: Hero of the Soviet Union; Order of Lenin; Order of the October Revolution; Medal "For Merit in Space Exploration"
- Space career

Cosmonaut
- Status: Retired
- Rank: Colonel, Soviet Air Force
- Time in space: 541d 00h 28m
- Selection: 1978 Cosmonaut Group
- Total EVAs: 7 (3 during Mir EO-3, 4 during Mir Eo-8)
- Total EVA time: 34h, 32m
- Missions: Mir EO-3 (Soyuz TM-4 / Soyuz TM-6), Mir EO-8 (Soyuz TM-11)
- Musa Manarov's voice Recorded 12 April 2011

Musa Khiramanovich Manarov (Russian: Муса Хираманович Манаров; Lak: Муса Хираманнул арс Маннаров; born 22 March 1951) is a former Soviet cosmonaut who spent 541 days in space.

He was a colonel in the Soviet Air Force and graduated from the Moscow Aviation Institute with an engineering qualification in 1974. Musa was selected as a cosmonaut on 1 December 1978.

From 21 December 1987 to 21 December 1988, he flew as flight engineer on Soyuz TM-4. The flight duration was 365 days, 22 hours, and 38 minutes. From 2 December 1990 to 26 May 1991, he flew again as a flight engineer on Soyuz TM-11. The duration was 175 days, 1 hour, and 50 minutes, the longest continuous time spent in space by anyone at that time. During his 176-day stay, Manarov observed the Earth and worked in space manufacturing. He also performed more than 20 hours of spacewalks. Manarov lives in Russia.

He was a member of the State Duma of the Russian Federation of the 5th convocation (2007–2011) as part of the United Russia faction.

== Personal life ==
Manarov is married and has two children. He is an ethnic Lak. He lives in Moscow, while his mother still lives in Baku.

== Awards and honors ==
- Hero of the Soviet Union
- Pilot-Cosmonaut of the USSR
- Order of Lenin
- Order of the October Revolution
- Medal "For Merit in Space Exploration"

Foreign awards:

- Officer of the Legion of Honour (France)
- Order of Stara Planina (Republic of Bulgaria)
- Order of Georgi Dimitrov (Republic of Bulgaria)
- Order "The Sun of Freedom" (Afghanistan)

== See also ==
- List of Muslim astronauts
