= List of human spaceflights to Mir =

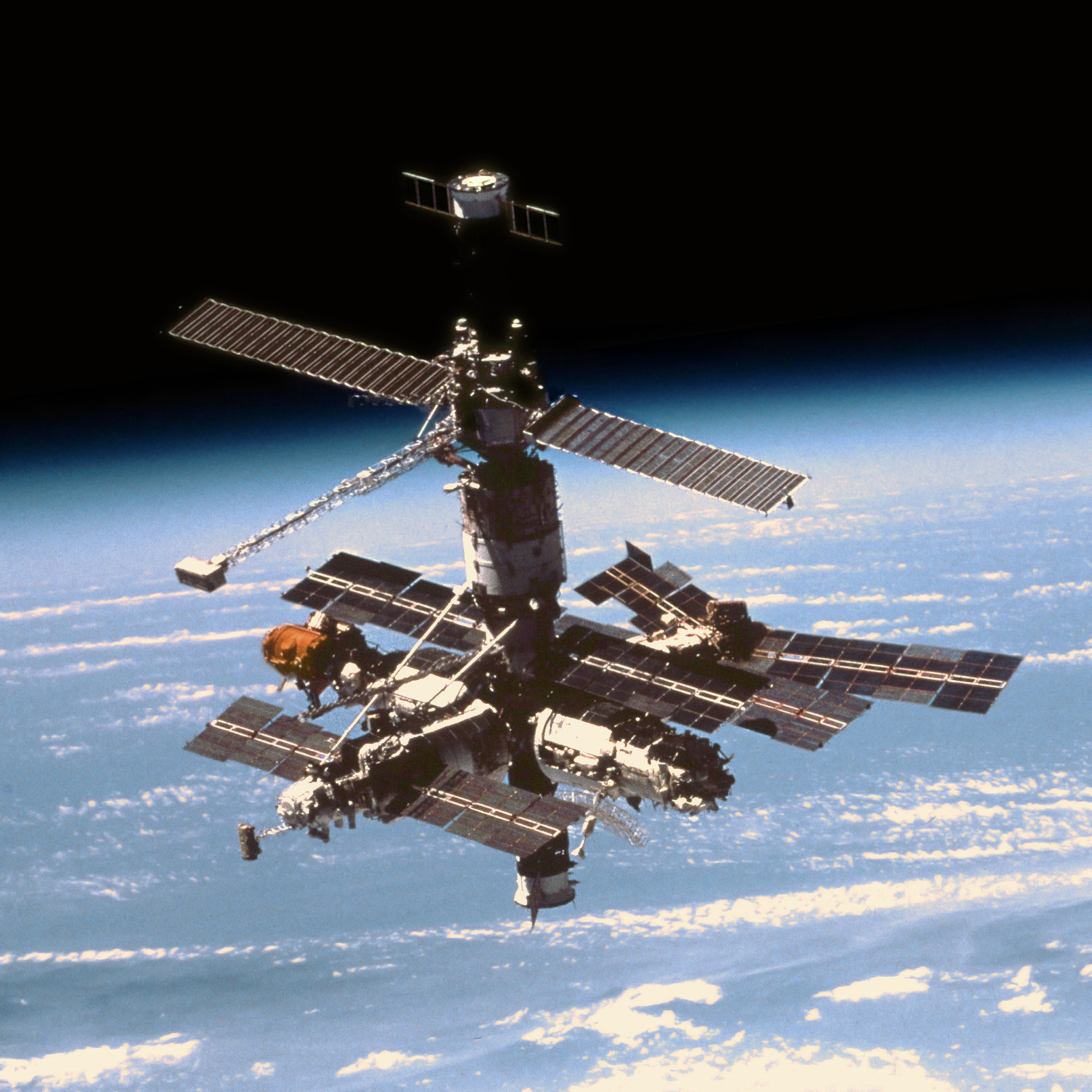
Soyuz TM-24 and Progress M-32 docked to the fore and aft ports Mir, as seen from the departing Space Shuttle Atlantis in September 1996 during STS-79.

Mir (Russian: Мир, IPA: [ˈmʲir]; lit. 'peace' or 'world') was a space station operated in low Earth orbit from 1986 to 2001, first by the Soviet Union and later by the Russian Federation. Mir was the first modular space station and was assembled in orbit from 1986 to 1996. It had a greater mass than any previous spacecraft. At the time it was the largest artificial satellite in orbit, succeeded by the International Space Station (ISS) after Mir's deorbiting. The station served as a microgravity research laboratory in which crews conducted experiments in biology, human biology, physics, astronomy, meteorology, and spacecraft systems with a goal of developing technologies required for permanent occupation of space.

Following the success of the Salyut programme, Mir represented the next stage in the Soviet Union's space station programme. The first module of the station, known as the core module or base block, was launched in 1986 and followed by six further modules. Proton rockets were used to launch all of its components except for the docking module, which was installed by US Space Shuttle mission STS-74 in 1995. When complete, the station consisted of seven pressurised modules and several unpressurised components. Power was provided by several photovoltaic arrays attached directly to the modules. The station was maintained at an orbit between 296 and 421 km (184 and 262 mi) altitude and travelled at an average speed of 27,700 km/h (17,200 mph), completing 15.7 orbits per day.

Human spaceflights were vital to the operation of Mir, allowing crews and equipment to be carried to and from the space station. Mir was visited by a total of 39 crewed missions, comprising 30 Soyuz flights (1 Soyuz-T, 29 Soyuz-TM) and 9 Space Shuttle flights. These missions carried both long-duration crew members flying principal expeditions (ranging from 70 days up to Valeri Polyakov's 14-month stay beginning in January 1994, which still holds the record for the longest continuous spaceflight by a single person) and short-term visitors (who spent about a week aboard the station). Many of the crew who visited Mir used different spacecraft to launch than they did to land; the first such examples were Aleksandr Viktorenko and Muhammed Faris who flew up in Soyuz TM-3 (launched 22 July 1987) and landed a week later in Soyuz TM-2 on 30 July 1987. The largest crew aboard Mir simultaneously (not including Shuttle-Mir missions) was 6, which first occurred with the launch of Soyuz TM-7 on 26 November 1988 and lasted for just over three weeks.

In this list, uncrewed visiting spacecraft are excluded (see List of uncrewed spaceflights to Mir for details), and long-duration crew members are listed in bold. Times are given in Coordinated Universal Time (UTC). "Time docked" refers to the spacecraft and does not necessarily correspond to the crew.

#	Mission	Launch date (UTC)	Time docked	Landing date (UTC)	Launch crew	Crew photo	Crew patch	Notes
1.	**Soyuz T-15**	13 March 1986; 12:33:09	~52 days ~20 days	16 July 1986; 12:34:05	(Soviet Union) **Leonid Kizim** (Soviet Union) **Vladimir Solovyov**			Delivered the first crew, flying expedition EO-1, to Mir, then undocked, flew to and docked with Salyut 7 before returning to Mir. Remains the only spacecraft to have visited two space stations during one mission.
2.	**Soyuz TM-2**	5 February 1987; 21:38:16	~172 days	30 July 1987; 01:04:12	(Soviet Union) **Yuri Romanenko** (Soviet Union) **Aleksandr Laveykin**			Delivered the second crew, flying expedition EO-2, to Mir.
3.	**Soyuz TM-3**	22 July 1987; 01:59:17	~158 days	29 December 1987; 09:16:15	(Soviet Union) **Aleksandr Aleksandrov** (Soviet Union) Aleksandr Viktorenko (Syria) Muhammed Faris			Delivered a third crew member, Aleksandrov, for EO-2, as well as the first Mir Intercosmos mission, EP-1, to the station. The EP-1 crew members, Viktorenko and Faris, returned to Earth aboard Soyuz TM-2 after 8 days.
4.	**Soyuz TM-4**	21 December 1987; 11:18:03	~177 days	17 June 1988; 10:12:32	(Soviet Union) **Vladimir Titov** (Soviet Union) **Musa Manarov** (Soviet Union) Anatoli Levchenko			Delivered the third expedition crew, EO-3, to Mir, in addition to Anatoli Levchenko, who returned to Earth aboard Soyuz TM-3 with the returning EO-2 crewmembers after 8 days.
5.	**Soyuz TM-5**	7 June 1988; 14:03:13	~90 days	7 September 1988; 00:49:38	(Soviet Union) Anatoly Solovyev (Soviet Union) Viktor Savinykh (Bulgaria) Aleksandr Aleksandrov			Delivered the second Mir Intercosmos mission, EP-2, to the station. All three crew returned to Earth aboard Soyuz TM-4 after 10 days.
6.	**Soyuz TM-6**	29 August 1988; 04:23:11	~112 days	21 December 1988; 09:57:00	(Soviet Union) **Valeri Polyakov** (Soviet Union) Vladimir Lyakhov (Afghanistan) Abdul Ahad Mohmand			Delivered a third crew member, Polyakov, for EO-3, in addition to the third Mir Intercosmos crew, EP-3, who returned to Earth aboard Soyuz TM-5 after 9 days.
7.	**Soyuz TM-7**	26 November 1988; 15:49:34	~149 days	27 April 1989; 02:57:58	(Soviet Union) **Aleksandr Volkov** (Soviet Union) **Sergei Krikalev** (France) Jean-Loup Chrétien			Delivered the EO-4 and Aragatz crews to Mir, with Chrétien returning to Earth aboard Soyuz TM-6 after 25 days.
8.	**Soyuz TM-8**	5 September 1989; 21:38:03	~165 days	19 February 1990; 04:36:18	(Soviet Union) **Aleksandr Viktorenko** (Soviet Union) **Aleksandr Serebrov**			Delivered the EO-5 crew to Mir.
9.	**Soyuz TM-9**	11 February 1990; 06:16:00	~177 days	9 August 1990; 07:33:57	(Soviet Union) **Anatoly Solovyev** (Soviet Union) **Aleksandr Balandin**			Delivered the EO-6 crew to Mir.
10.	**Soyuz TM-10**	1 August 1990; 09:32:21	~129 days	10 December 1990; 06:08:12	(Soviet Union) **Gennadi Manakov** (Soviet Union) **Gennady Strekalov**			Delivered the EO-7 crew to Mir.
11.	**Soyuz TM-11**	1 December 1990; 08:13:32	~173 days	26 May 1991; 10:04:13	(Soviet Union) **Viktor Afanasyev** (Soviet Union) **Musa Manarov** (Japan) Toyohiro Akiyama			Delivered the EO-8 crew to Mir, in addition to the Japanese Kosmoreporter mission. Akiyama, who became the first Japanese citizen to fly in space, returned to Earth aboard Soyuz TM-10 after 8 days.
12.	**Soyuz TM-12**	18 May 1991; 12:50:28	~142 days	10 October 1991; 04:12:18	(Soviet Union) **Anatoly Artsebarsky** (Soviet Union) / (Russia) **Sergei Krikalev** (United Kingdom) Helen Sharman			Delivered the EO-9 crew to Mir, in addition to the British Project Juno mission. Sharman, the first Briton to travel into space whilst not holding American citizenship, returned to Earth aboard Soyuz TM-11 after 8 days.
13.	**Soyuz TM-13**	2 October 1991; 05:59:38	~173 days	25 March 1992; 08:51:22	(Soviet Union) / (Russia) **Aleksandr Volkov** (Soviet Union) Toktar Aubakirov (Austria) Franz Viehböck			The last crewed spaceflight ever launched by the Soviet Union, Soyuz TM-13 delivered a third crew member to Mir for EO-10, in addition to carrying the first Austrian to go into space as part of the Austromir '91 mission. Aubakirov and Viehböck returned to Earth aboard Soyuz TMA-12 after 8 days.
14.	**Soyuz TM-14**	17 March 1992; 10:54:30	~143 days	10 August 1992; 01:05:02	(Russia) **Aleksandr Viktorenko** (Russia) **Aleksandr Kaleri** (Germany) Klaus-Dietrich Flade			The first crewed spaceflight to be launched by the Russian Federation, Soyuz TM-14 delivered the EO-11 crew to Mir, in addition to Flade, flying the German Mir '92 mission, who returned to Earth aboard Soyuz TM-13 after 8 days.
15.	**Soyuz TM-15**	27 July 1992; 06:08:42	~187 days	1 February 1993; 03:49:57	(Russia) **Anatoly Solovyev** (Russia) **Sergei Avdeyev** (France) Michel Tognini			Delivered the EO-12 crew to Mir, in addition to the French Antarès mission. Tognini returned to Earth aboard Soyuz TM-14 after 14 days.
16.	**Soyuz TM-16**	24 January 1993; 05:58:05	~177 days	22 July 1993; 06:41:50	(Russia) **Gennadi Manakov** (Russia) **Aleksandr Poleshchuk**			Delivered the EO-13 crew to Mir. Became the only Soyuz spacecraft to dock at Kristall's distal APAS-89 port in order to check the port in preparation for the Shuttle-Mir flights which followed.
17.	**Soyuz TM-17**	1 July 1993; 14:32:58	~195 days	14 January 1994; 08:18:20	(Russia) **Vasili Tsibliyev** (Russia) **Aleksandr Serebrov** (France) Jean-Pierre Haigneré			Delivered the EO-14 crew to Mir, in addition to the French Altair mission. Haigneré returned to Earth aboard Soyuz TM-16 after 21 days.
18.	**Soyuz TM-18**	8 January 1994; 10:05:34	~180 days	9 July 1994; 10:32:35	(Russia) **Viktor Afanasyev** (Russia) **Yury Usachev** (Russia) **Valeri Polyakov**			Delivered the EO-15 crew to Mir, with Polyakov remaining in space for over 437 days, the current world record for longest single spaceflight.
19.	**Soyuz TM-19**	1 July 1994; 12:24:50	~124 days	4 November 1994; 11:18:26	(Russia) **Yuri Malenchenko** (Russia) **Talgat Musabayev**			Delivered the EO-16 crew to Mir.
20.	**Soyuz TM-20**	3 October 1994; 22:42:30	~166 days	22 March 1995; 04:04:05	(Russia) **Aleksandr Viktorenko** (Russia) **Yelena Kondakova** (Germany) Ulf Merbold			Delivered the EO-17 crew to Mir, in addition to the German Euromir '94 mission. Merbold returned to Earth aboard Soyuz TM-19 after 32 days.
21.	**Soyuz TM-21**	14 March 1995; 06:11:34	~179 days	11 September 1995; 06:52:40	(Russia) **Vladimir Dezhurov** (Russia) **Gennady Strekalov** (United States) **Norman E. Thagard**			Delivered the EO-18 crew to Mir, including Thagard, flying the first US long-duration mission of the Shuttle-Mir programme. The entire crew returned to Earth aboard Space Shuttle Atlantis at the conclusion of STS-71.
22.	**STS-71**; Atlantis	27 June 1995	4 days, 22 hours		(United States) Robert L. Gibson (United States) Charles J. Precourt (United States) Ellen S. Baker (United States) Bonnie J. Dunbar (United States) Gregory J. Harbaugh (Russia) **Anatoly Solovyev** (Russia) **Nikolai Budarin**			Delivered Mir EO-19 crew Returned Mir EO-18 crew
23.	**Soyuz TM-22**	3 September 1995; 09:00:23	~177 days	29 February 1996; 10:42:08	(Russia) **Yuri Gidzenko** (Russia) **Sergei Avdeyev** (Germany) **Thomas Reiter**			Delivered the EO-20 crew to Mir, including the German Euromir '95 mission.
24.	**STS-74**; Atlantis	12 November 1995	3 days, 2 hours		(United States) Kenneth D. Cameron (United States) James D. Halsell (United States) Jerry L. Ross (United States) William S. McArthur (Canada) Chris A. Hadfield			Delivered Mir Docking Module & Solar Array Package
25.	**Soyuz TM-23**	21 February 1996; 12:34:05	~192 days	2 September 1996; 07:41:40	(Russia) **Yuri Onufrienko** (Russia) **Yury Usachev**			Delivered the EO-21 crew to Mir.
26.	**STS-76**; Atlantis	22 March 1996	4 days, 23 hours		(United States) Kevin P. Chilton (United States) Richard A. Searfoss (United States) Linda M. Godwin (United States) Michael R. Clifford (United States) Ronald M. Sega (United States) **Shannon W. Lucid**			Delivered Lucid for Mir EO-21 crew Deployed MEEP; 1 spacewalk
27.	**Soyuz TM-24**	17 August 1996; 13:18:03	~195 days	2 March 1997; 06:44:16	(Russia) **Valery Korzun** (Russia) **Aleksandr Kaleri** (France) Claudie Haigneré			Delivered the EO-21 crew to Mir. Haigneré returned to Earth aboard Soyuz TM-23 after 16 days.
28.	**STS-79**; Atlantis	16 September 1996	4 days, 22 hours		(United States) William F. Readdy (United States) Terrence W. Wilcutt (United States) Thomas D. Akers (United States) Jerome Apt (United States) Carl E. Walz (United States) **John E. Blaha**			Delivered Blaha for Mir EO-22 crew
29.	**STS-81**; Atlantis	12 January 1997	4 days, 22 hours		(United States) Michael A. Baker (United States) Brent W. Jett (United States) John M. Grunsfeld (United States) Marsha S. Ivins (United States) Peter J. K. Wisoff (United States) **Jerry M. Linenger**			Delivered Linenger for Mir EO-22 crew
30.	**Soyuz TM-25**	10 February 1997; 14:09:30	~183 days	14 August 1997; 12:17:10	(Russia) **Vasili Tsibliyev** (Russia) **Aleksandr Lazutkin** (Germany) Reinhold Ewald			Delivered the EO-23 crew to Mir. Ewald returned to Earth aboard Soyuz TM-24 after 20 days.
31.	**STS-84**; Atlantis	15 May 1997	4 days, 23 hours		(United States) Charles J. Precourt (United States) Eileen M. Collins (United States) Carlos I. Noriega (United States) Edward T. Lu (France) Jean-François Clervoy (Russia) Yelena Kondakova (United States) **Michael Foale**			Delivered Foale for Mir EO-23 crew
32.	**Soyuz TM-26**	5 August 1997; 15:35:54	~196 days	19 February 1998; 09:10:30	(Russia) **Anatoly Solovyev** (Russia) **Pavel Vinogradov**			Delivered the EO-24 crew to Mir.
33.	**STS-86**; Atlantis	27 September 1997	5 days, 22 hours		(United States) James D. Wetherbee (United States) Michael J. Bloomfield (United States) Scott E. Parazynski (United States) Wendy B. Lawrence (France) Jean-Loup Chrétien (Russia) Vladimir Titov (United States) **David A. Wolf**			Delivered Wolf for Mir EO-24 crew Retrieved MEEP; 1 spacewalk
34.	**STS-89**; Endeavour	22 January 1998	4 days, 21 hours		(United States) Terrence W. Wilcutt (United States) Joe F. Edwards (United States) Bonnie J. Dunbar (United States) Michael P. Anderson (United States) James F. Reilly (Russia) Salizhan Sharipov (United States) **Andrew S.W. Thomas**			Delivered Thomas for Mir EO-24 crew
35.	**Soyuz TM-27**	29 January 1998; 16:33:42	~206 days	25 August 1998; 05:24:44	(Russia) **Talgat Musabayev** (Russia) **Nikolai Budarin**			Delivered the EO-25 crew to Mir.
35.	**Soyuz TM-27**	29 January 1998; 16:33:42	~206 days	25 August 1998; 05:24:44	(France) Léopold Eyharts			Eyharts returned to Earth aboard Soyuz TM-26 after 22 days.
36.	**STS-91**; Discovery	2 June 1998	3 days, 23 hours		(United States) Charles J. Precourt (United States) Dominic L. Pudwill Gorie (United States) Wendy B. Lawrence (United States) Franklin R. Chang-Diaz (United States) Janet L. Kavandi (Russia) Valery Ryumin			Returned Thomas from Mir EO-25 crew
37.	**Soyuz TM-28**	13 August 1998; 09:43:11	~196 days	28 February 1999; 02:14:30	(Russia) **Gennady Padalka** (Russia) **Sergei Avdeyev** (Russia) Yuri Baturin			Delivered the EO-26 crew to Mir. Baturin returned to Earth aboard Soyuz TM-27 after 12 days.
38.	**Soyuz TM-29**	20 February 1999; 04:18:01	~186 days	28 August 1999; 00:34:20	(Russia) **Viktor Afanasyev** (France) **Jean-Pierre Haigneré** (Slovakia) Ivan Bella			Delivered the EO-27 crew to Mir. Bella returned to Earth aboard Soyuz TM-28 after 8 days.
39.	**Soyuz TM-30**	4 April 2000; 05:01:29	~70 days	16 June 2000; 00:44	(Russia) **Sergei Zalyotin** (Russia) **Aleksandr Kaleri**			Final human spaceflight to Mir. Delivered the last crew, flying EO-28.

== See also ==
- List of human spaceflights to the International Space Station
- List of Mir expeditions
- List of Mir spacewalks
- List of Mir visitors
- List of Progress flights
- List of uncrewed spaceflights to Mir
- Uncrewed spaceflights to the International Space Station
