= Soyuz-TM =

Fourth-generation of the Soyuz spacecraft

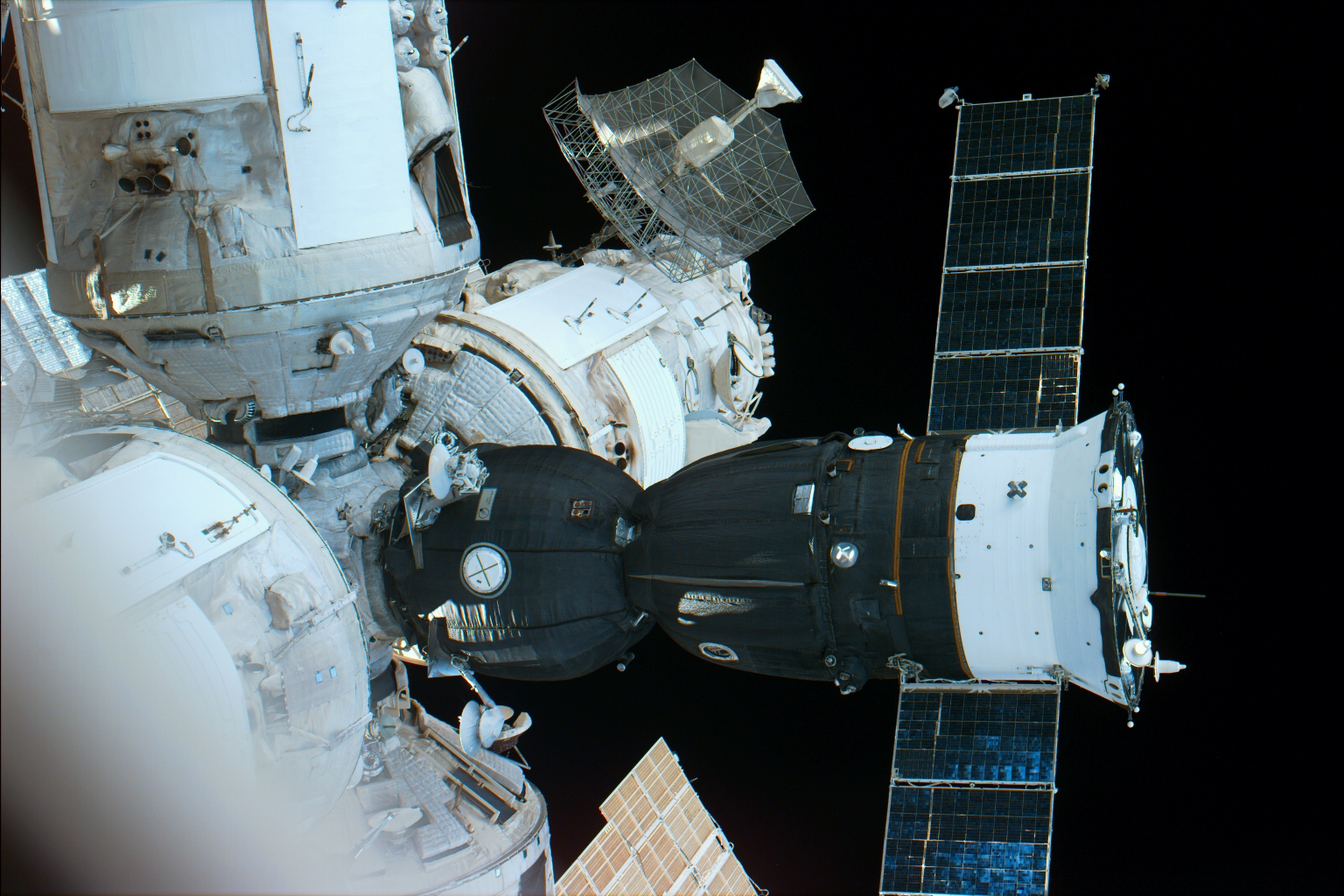
- Soyuz-TM spacecraft.
- Manufacturer: Korolev
- Country of origin: Soviet Union and Russia
- Operator: Soviet space program/Russian Federal Space Agency
- Applications: Carry three cosmonauts to Mir and ISS and back

Specifications
- Regime: Low Earth orbit
- Design life: Up to six months docked to station

Production
- Status: Out of service
- Launched: 34
- Maiden launch: Soyuz TM-1, 1986
- Last launch: Soyuz TM-34, 2002

Related spacecraft
- Derived from: Soyuz-T
- Derivatives: Soyuz-TMA

The Soyuz TM (Russian: транспортный модифицированный, romanized: Transportnyi Modifitsirovannyi, lit. 'Transport Modified') were fourth generation (1986–2002) Soyuz spacecraft used for ferry flights to the Mir and ISS space stations. The Soyuz spacecraft consisted of three parts, the Orbital Module, the Descent Module and the Service Module.

The first launch of the spacecraft was the uncrewed Soyuz TM-1 on May 21, 1986, where it docked with the Mir space station. The final flight was Soyuz TM-34, which docked with the International Space Station and landed November 10, 2002.

== Background ==
After the Apollo-Soyuz Test project in 1976, the Soyuz for crewed flights had the singular mission of supporting crewed space stations. The original Soyuz had a limited endurance when docked with a station, only about 60 to 90 days. There were two avenues for extending the duration of missions past this. The first avenue was to make upgrades to increase the Soyuz spacecraft's endurance. The Soyuz-T could last 120 days and the Soyuz-TM could last 180 days. The other was to use a Visiting Expedition to fly a new Soyuz up to the station and depart with the spacecraft nearing the end of its rated endurance.

The preliminary design was released in April 1981 and the main set of working documentation was released in early 1982.

== Upgrades from Soyuz-T ==
=== Orbital Module ===
With the growth of orbital complexes, the Soyuz-T used the Igla system that required continuous orientation with the station and had high fuel costs. The Soyuz-TM was upgraded with the Kurs system that did not require the same orientation from the station and allowed measurements from a range of 200 km instead of the 30 km of the Igla.

=== Descent Module ===
It also increased the payload to 51.6° orbit by 200–250 kg and was able to return 70–90 kg more back to earth. Energia accomplished this by increasing the capabilities of the launch vehicle and decreasing the mass of the ship. The parachute system mass was decreased by 120 kg (40%) by using synthetic material for the slings and lightweight material for the parachute domes.

=== Propulsion/Service Module ===
It also featured a new KTDU-80 propulsion module that permitted the Soyuz-TM to maneuver independently of the station, without the station making "mirror image" maneuvers to match unwanted translations introduced by earlier models' aft-mounted attitude control. It also used the baffles inside the tanks became structural, allowing further reduction in mass.

== Typical Flight for Soyuz-TM ==
=== Training ===
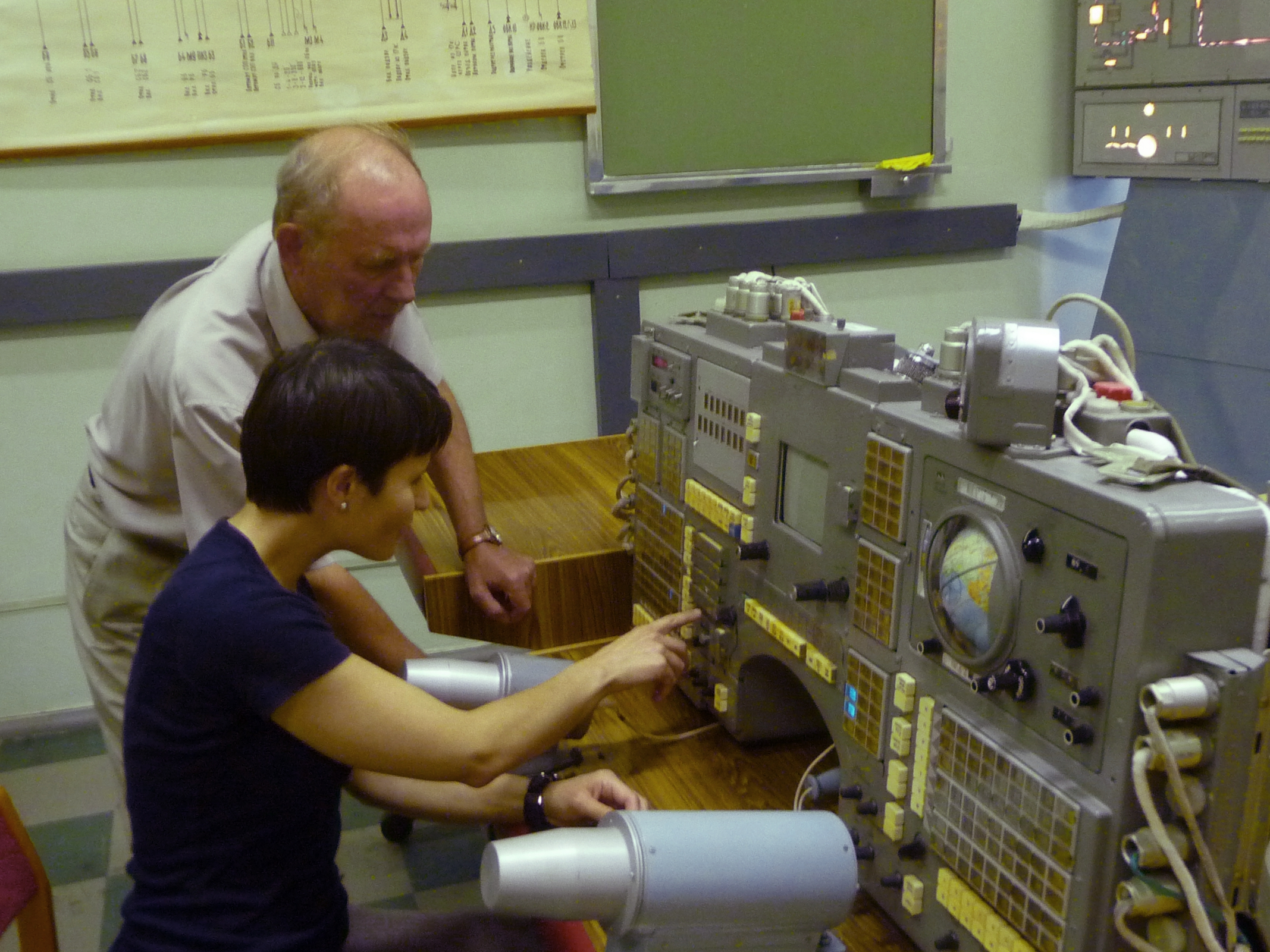
Soyuz TM control panel simulator

Classroom training is completed on Soyuz systems and required crew operations. Cosmonauts must pass an oral test on the material for certification. Training was also completed on Soyuz mockups and simulators. Two weeks before launch, after passing all the tests, the crew is flown to Baikonur to participate in a test at the launch site to go through all the steps associated with the launch.

=== For Flight Readiness ===
The final decision to launch is made by the assembly company (General Designer). There is a Space Committee formed of approximately 20 people headed by a 3-star General for Air and Space with the following representation:

- RSA
- NPO-Energia
- General Designer
- Central Institute of Machine Building
- Ministry of Defense
- Physicians
- Baikonur

When different companies/countries are involved, they are represented as well at on the Space Committee. For Soyuz launches, the Ministry of Defense representative states that everything has been checked because all preparations at Baikonur are performed by the military. Independent assessment is made by the Central Institute of Machine Building for every flight. Cosmonauts had to get clearance from the Russian Medical Commission, the Institute of Biomedical Problems and the GCTC at the flight readiness Review.

== Table of Flights ==
Mission	Launch	Launch Crew	Landed	Landed Crew	Duration	Summary
Soyuz TM-1	21 May 1986		30 May 1986		9 days	Uncrewed test flight
Soyuz TM-2	5 February 1987	Mir EO-2: (Soviet Union) Yuri Romanenko (Soviet Union) Aleksandr Laveykin	30 July 1987	Mir EP-1: (Soviet Union) Aleksandr Viktorenko (Ba'athist Syria) Muhammed Faris; Mir EO-2: (Soviet Union) Aleksandr Laveykin	174 days	
Soyuz TM-3	22 July 1987	Mir EP-1: (Soviet Union) Aleksandr Viktorenko (Ba'athist Syria) Muhammed Faris; Mir EO-2: (Soviet Union) Aleksandr Pavlovich Aleksandrov	29 December 1987	Mir EO-2: (Soviet Union) Yuri Romanenko (Soviet Union) Aleksandr Pavlovich Aleksandrov; Mir LII-1: (Soviet Union) Anatoli Levchenko	160 days	
Soyuz TM-4	21 December 1987	Mir EO-3: (Soviet Union) Vladimir Titov (Soviet Union) Musa Manarov; Mir LII-1: (Soviet Union) Anatoli Levchenko	17 June 1988	Mir EP-2: (Soviet Union) Anatoly Solovyev (Soviet Union) Viktor Savinykh (Bulgaria) Aleksandr Aleksandrov	178 days	
Soyuz TM-5	7 June 1988	Mir EP-2: (Soviet Union) Anatoly Solovyev (Soviet Union) Viktor Savinykh (Bulgaria) Aleksandr Aleksandrov	7 September 1988	Mir EP-3: (Soviet Union) Vladimir Lyakhov (Afghanistan) Abdul Ahad Mohmand	91 days	
Soyuz TM-6	29 August 1988	Mir EP-3: (Soviet Union) Vladimir Lyakhov (Afghanistan) Abdul Mohmand (Soviet Union) Valeri Polyakov	21 December 1988	Mir EO-3: (Soviet Union) Vladimir Titov (Soviet Union) Musa Manarov; Mir Aragatz: (France) Jean-Loup Chrétien	114 days	
Soyuz TM-7	26 November 1988	Mir EO-4: (Soviet Union) Alexander Volkov (Soviet Union) Sergei Krikalev; Mir Aragatz: (France) Jean-Loup Chrétien	27 April 1989	Mir EO-4: (Soviet Union) Alexander Volkov (Soviet Union) Sergei Krikalev (Soviet Union) Valeri Polyakov	151 days	
Soyuz TM-8	5 September 1989	Mir EO-5: (Soviet Union) Aleksandr Viktorenko (Soviet Union) Aleksandr Serebrov	19 February 1990	Mir EO-5: (Soviet Union) Aleksandr Viktorenko (Soviet Union) Aleksandr Serebrov	166 days	
Soyuz TM-9	11 February 1990	Mir EO-6: (Soviet Union) Anatoly Solovyev (Soviet Union) Aleksandr Balandin	9 August 1990	Mir EO-6: (Soviet Union) Anatoly Solovyev (Soviet Union) Aleksandr Balandin	179 days	
Soyuz TM-10	1 August 1990	Mir EO-7: (Soviet Union) Gennady Manakov (Soviet Union) Gennady Strekalov	10 December 1990	Mir EO-7: (Soviet Union) Gennady Manakov (Soviet Union) Gennady Strekalov; Reporter: (Japan) Toyohiro Akiyama	130 days	
Soyuz TM-11	2 December 1990	Mir EO-8: (Soviet Union) Viktor Afanasyev (Soviet Union) Musa Manarov; Reporter: (Japan) Toyohiro Akiyama	26 May 1991	Mir EO-8: (Soviet Union) Viktor Afanasyev (Soviet Union) Musa Manarov; Project Juno: (United Kingdom) Helen Sharman	175 days	
Soyuz TM-12	18 May 1991	Mir EO-9: (Soviet Union) Anatoly Artsebarsky (Soviet Union) Sergei Krikalev; Project Juno: (United Kingdom) Helen Sharman	10 October 1991	Mir EO-9: (Soviet Union) Anatoly Artsebarsky; Others: (Kazakh Soviet Socialist Republic) Toktar Aubakirov (Austria) Franz Viehböck	144 days	
Soyuz TM-13	2 October 1991	Mir EO-10: (Soviet Union) Alexander Volkov; Others: (Kazakh Soviet Socialist Republic) Toktar Aubakirov (Austria) Franz Viehböck	25 March 1992	Mir EO-10: (Russia) Alexander Volkov (Russia) Sergei Krikalev; Other: (Germany) Klaus-Dietrich Flade	175 days	In orbit during the Dissolution of the Soviet Union
Soyuz TM-14	17 March 1992	Mir EO-11: (Russia) Aleksandr Viktorenko (Russia) Aleksandr Kaleri; Other: (Germany) Klaus-Dietrich Flade	10 August 1992	Mir EO-11: (Russia) Aleksandr Viktorenko (Russia) Aleksandr Kaleri; Other: (France) Michel Tognini	145 days	
Soyuz TM-15	27 July 1992	Mir EO-12: (Russia) Anatoly Solovyev (Russia) Sergei Avdeyev; Other: (France) Michel Tognini	1 February 1993	Mir EO-12: (Russia) Anatoly Solovyev (Russia) Sergei Avdeyev	188 days	
Soyuz TM-16	24 January 1993	Mir EO-13: (Russia) Gennadi Manakov (Russia) Alexander Poleshchuk	22 July 1993	Mir EO-13: (Russia) Gennadi Manakov (Russia) Alexander Poleshchuk; Other: (France) Jean-Pierre Haigneré	179 days	
Soyuz TM-17	1 July 1993	Mir EO-14: (Russia) Vasili Tsibliyev (Russia) Aleksandr Serebrov; Other: (France) Jean-Pierre Haigneré	14 January 1994	Mir EO-14: (Russia) Vasili Tsibliyev (Russia) Aleksandr Serebrov	196 days	
Soyuz TM-18	8 January 1994	Mir EO-15: (Russia) Viktor Afanasyev (Russia) Yury Usachov (Russia) Valeri Polyakov	9 July 1994	Mir EO-15: (Russia) Viktor Afanasyev (Russia) Yury Usachov	182 days	
Soyuz TM-19	1 July 1994	Mir EO-16: (Russia) Yuri Malenchenko (Kazakhstan) Talgat Musabayev	4 November 1994	Mir EO-16: (Russia) Yuri Malenchenko (Kazakhstan) Talgat Musabayev; Euromir 94: (Germany) Ulf Merbold	125 days	
Soyuz TM-20	3 October 1994	Mir EO-17: (Russia) Aleksandr Viktorenko (Russia) Yelena Kondakova; Euromir 94: (Germany) Ulf Merbold	22 March 1995	Mir EO-17: (Russia) Aleksandr Viktorenko (Russia) Yelena Kondakova (Russia) Valeri Polyakov	169 days	
Soyuz TM-21	14 March 1995	Mir EO-18: (Russia) Vladimir Dezhurov (Russia) Gennady Strekalov (United States) Norman Thagard	11 September 1995	Mir EO-19: (Russia) Anatoly Solovyev (Russia) Nikolai Budarin	181 days	
Soyuz TM-22	3 September 1995	Mir EO-20: (Russia) Yuri Gidzenko (Russia) Sergei Avdeyev; Euromir 95: (Germany) Thomas Reiter	29 February 1996	Mir EO-20: (Russia) Yuri Gidzenko (Russia) Sergei Avdeyev; Euromir 95: (Germany) Thomas Reiter	179 days	
Soyuz TM-23	21 February 1996	Mir EO-21: (Russia) Yuri Onufrienko (Russia) Yury Usachov	2 September 1996	Mir EO-21: (Russia) Yuri Onufrienko (Russia) Yury Usachov; Other: (France) Claudie André-Deshays	193 days	
Soyuz TM-24	17 August 1996	Mir EO-22: (Russia) Valery Korzun (Russia) Aleksandr Kaleri; Other: (France) Claudie André-Deshays	2 March 1997	Mir EO-22: (Russia) Valery Korzun (Russia) Aleksandr Kaleri; Other: (Germany) Reinhold Ewald	196 days	
Soyuz TM-25	10 February 1997	Mir EO-23: (Russia) Vasili Tsibliyev (Russia) Aleksandr Lazutkin; Other: (Germany) Reinhold Ewald	14 August 1997	Mir EO-23: (Russia) Vasili Tsibliyev (Russia) Aleksandr Lazutkin	184 days	
Soyuz TM-26	5 August 1997	Mir EO-24: (Russia) Anatoly Solovyev (Russia) Pavel Vinogradov	19 February 1998	Mir EO-24: (Russia) Anatoly Solovyev (Russia) Pavel Vinogradov; Other: (France) Léopold Eyharts	197 days	
Soyuz TM-27	29 January 1998	Mir EO-25: (Russia) Talgat Musabayev (Russia) Nikolai Budarin; Other: (France) Léopold Eyharts	25 August 1998	Mir EO-25: (Russia) Talgat Musabayev (Russia) Nikolai Budarin; Other: (Russia) Yuri Baturin	207 days	
Soyuz TM-28	13 August 1998	Mir EO-26: (Russia) Gennady I. Padalka (Russia) Sergei Avdeyev; Other: (Russia) Yuri Baturin	28 February 1999	Mir EO-26: (Russia) Gennady I. Padalka; Other: (Slovakia) Ivan Bella	198 days	
Soyuz TM-29	20 February 1999	Mir EO-27: (Russia) Viktor Afanasyev (France) Jean-Pierre Haigneré; Other: (Slovakia) Ivan Bella	28 August 1999	Mir EO-27: (Russia) Viktor Afanasyev (France) Jean-Pierre Haigneré; Other: (Russia) Sergei Avdeyev	188 days	
Soyuz TM-30	4 April 2000	Mir EO-28: (Russia) Sergei Zalyotin (Russia) Aleksandr Kaleri	16 June 2000	Mir EO-28: (Russia) Sergei Zalyotin (Russia) Aleksandr Kaleri	72 days	Last mission to Mir
Soyuz TM-31	31 October 2000	Expedition 1: (Russia) Yuri Gidzenko (Russia) Sergei Krikalev (United States) William Shepherd	6 May 2001	ISS EP-1: (Russia) Talgat Musabayev (Russia) Yuri Baturin (United States) Dennis Tito	186 days	First Soyuz to the International Space Station
Soyuz TM-32	28 April 2001	ISS EP-1: (Russia) Talgat Musabayev (Russia) Yuri Baturin (United States) Dennis Tito	31 October 2001	ISS EP-2: (Russia) Viktor M. Afanasyev (France) Claudie Haigneré (Russia) Konstantin Kozeyev	185 days	
Soyuz TM-33	21 October 2001	ISS EP-2: (Russia) Viktor M. Afanasyev (France) Claudie Haigneré (Russia) Konstantin Kozeyev	5 May 2002	(Russia) Yuri Gidzenko (Italy) Roberto Vittori (South Africa) Mark Shuttleworth	195 days	
Soyuz TM-34	25 April 2002	(Russia) Yuri Gidzenko (Italy) Roberto Vittori (South Africa) Mark Shuttleworth	10 November 2002	(Russia) Sergei Zalyotin (Belgium) Frank De Winne (Russia) Yury Lonchakov	198 days	

== Gallery ==
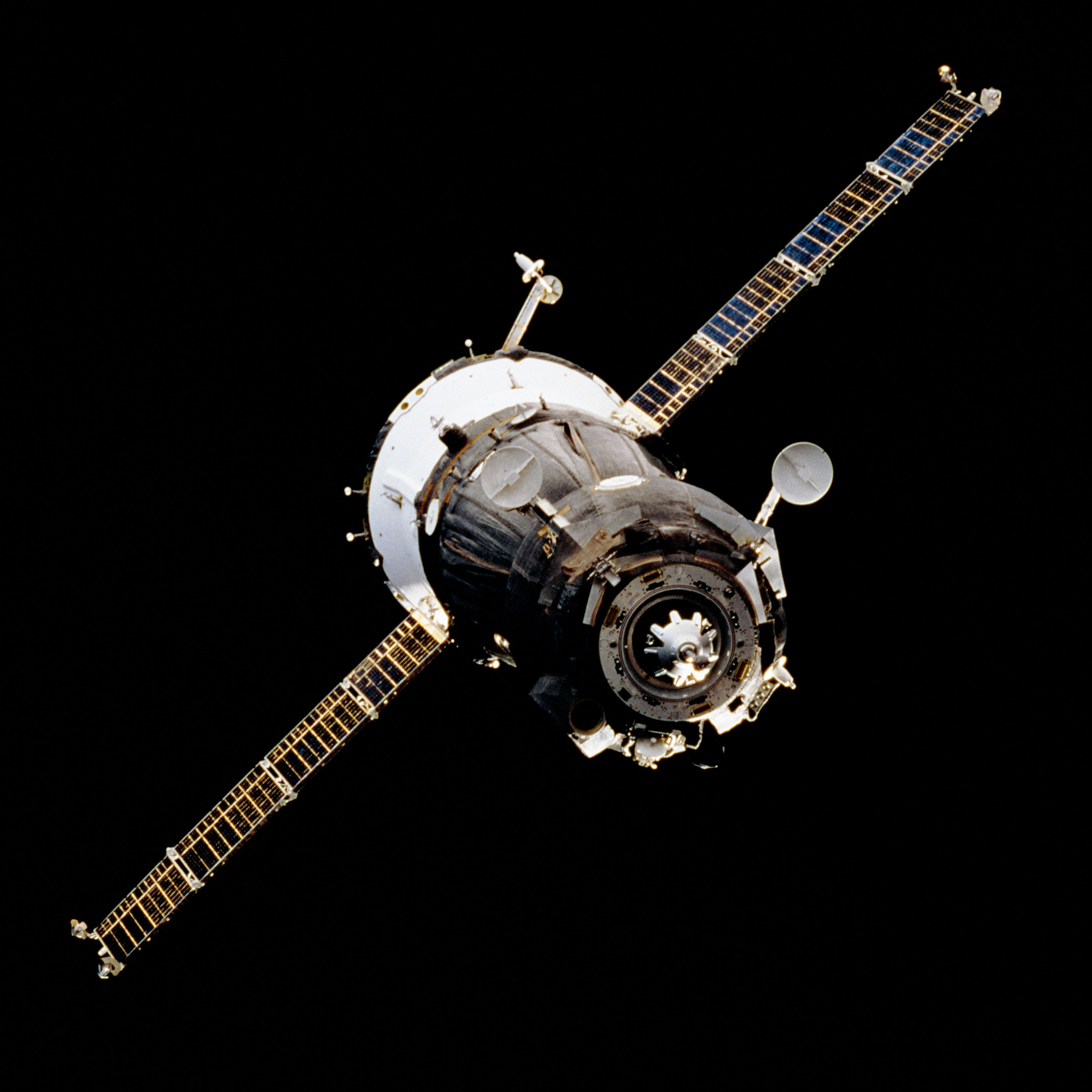

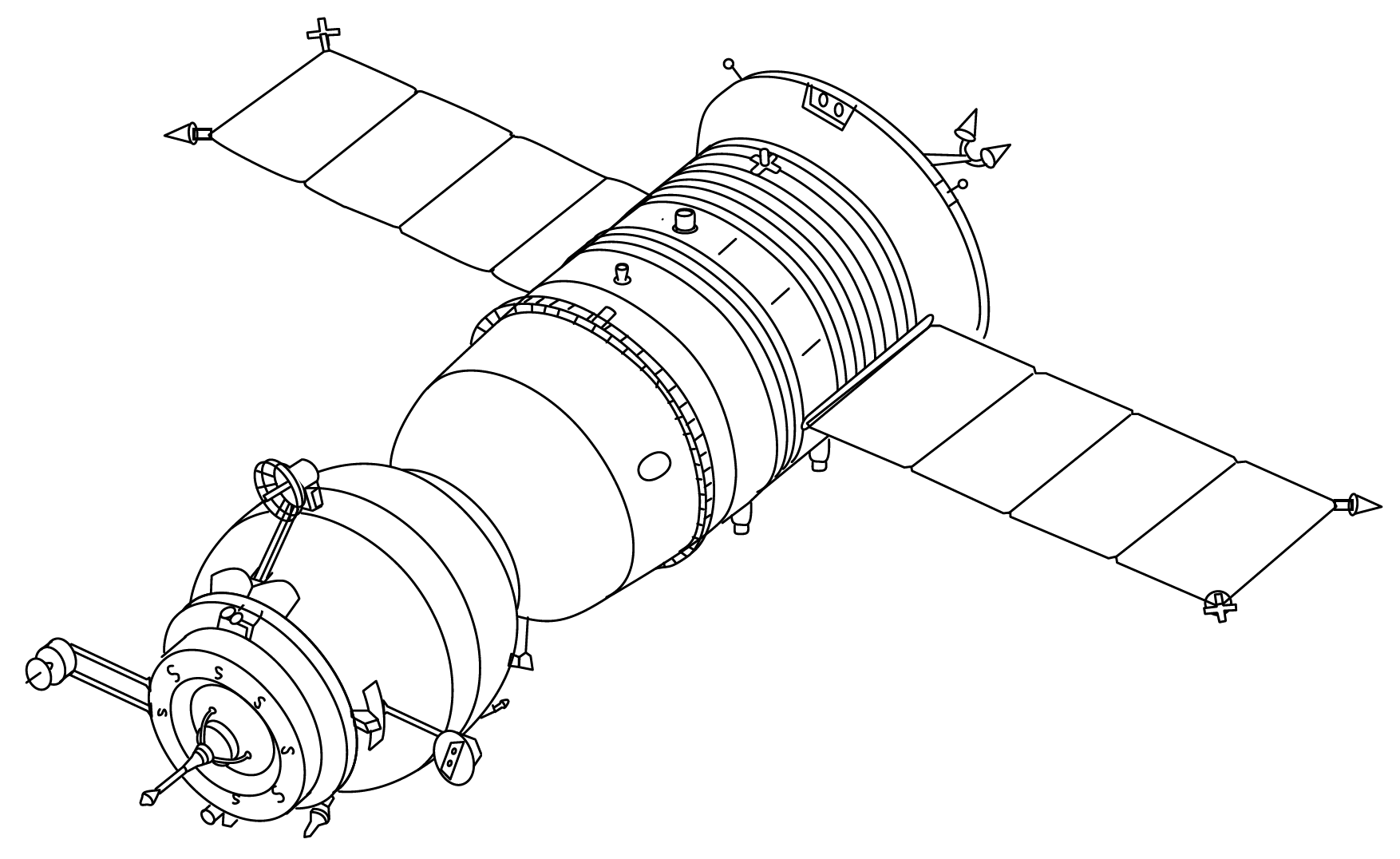
