= Soyuz TM-8 =

1989 Soviet crewed spaceflight to Mir

- COSPAR ID: 1989-071A
- SATCAT no.: 20218
- Mission duration: 166 days, 6 hours, 58 minutes, 15 seconds
- Orbits completed: ~2,680

Spacecraft properties
- Spacecraft: Soyuz 7K-STM No. 58
- Spacecraft type: Soyuz-TM
- Manufacturer: NPO Energia
- Launch mass: 7,150 kilograms (15,760 lb)

Crew
- Crew size: 2
- Members: Aleksandr Viktorenko; Aleksandr Serebrov
- Callsign: Ви́тязь (Vityaz - Knight)

Start of mission
- Launch date: 5 September 1989, 21:38:03 UTC
- Rocket: Soyuz-U2

End of mission
- Landing date: 19 February 1990, 04:36:18 UTC
- Landing site: 55 kilometres (34 mi) NE of Arkalyk

Orbital parameters
- Reference system: Geocentric
- Regime: Low Earth
- Perigee altitude: 390 kilometres (240 mi)
- Apogee altitude: 392 kilometres (244 mi)
- Inclination: 51.6 degrees
- Period: 92.4 minutes

Docking with Mir
- Docking date: 7 September 1989, 22:25:26: UTC
- Undocking date: 19 February 1990, 01:06:20 UTC
- Soyuz programme (Crewed missions)

Soyuz TM-8 was a 1989 spaceflight which carried the fifth long duration crew to the Soviet space station Mir. It was part of the Soyuz-TM series of spacecraft, which were the fourth generation of the Soviet Soyuz. Soyuz TM-8 was the eighth crewed spaceflight to Mir, and spent 166 days in orbit.

== Crew ==
The crew consisted of two Soviet cosmonauts. They had both been in space, but only Viktorenko had previously been to Mir, which was a 7-day visit during Mir EP-1.

Position	Crew
Commander	Aleksandr Viktorenko; Mir EO-5; Second spaceflight
Flight engineer	Aleksandr Serebrov; Mir EO-5; Third spaceflight

== Launch and docking ==
The Soyuz-U2 rocket was painted with advertisements. During the Soyuz spacecraft's final approach to Mir (4 metre distance), the Kurs rendezvous and docking system malfunctioned, so Viktorenko took over manual control and withdrew to 20 metres, and then docked manually. The spacecraft spent 166 days attached to Mir, for the duration of the expedition Mir EO-5.

== Return to Earth ==
Soyuz TM-8 landed at 04:36 UTC on 19 February 1990, after an uneventful flight to Earth.
