= Soyuz TM-3 =

1987 Soviet crewed spaceflight to Mir

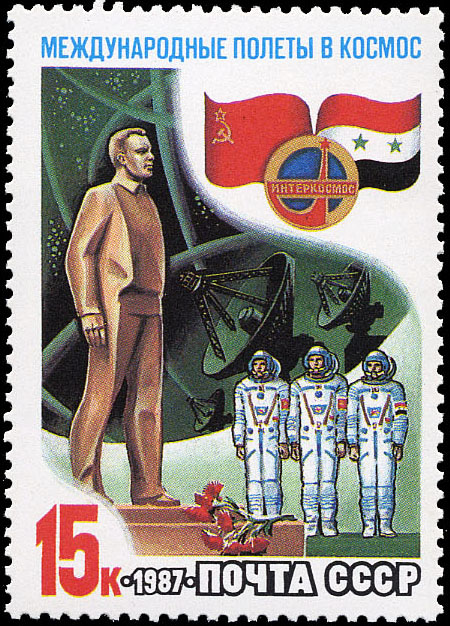
- 1987 USSR stamp commemorating Soviet-Syrian collaboration in the TM-3 mission.
- COSPAR ID: 1987-063A
- SATCAT no.: 18222
- Mission duration: 160 days, 7 hours, 25 minutes, 56 seconds
- Orbits completed: ~2,580

Spacecraft properties
- Spacecraft: Soyuz 7K-STM No. 53
- Spacecraft type: Soyuz-TM
- Manufacturer: NPO Energia
- Launch mass: 7,100 kilograms (15,700 lb)

Crew
- Crew size: 3
- Members: Aleksandr Pavlovich Aleksandrov
- Launching: Aleksandr Viktorenko; Muhammed Faris
- Landing: Yuri Romanenko; Anatoli Levchenko
- Callsign: Vityaz (Knight)

Start of mission
- Launch date: 22 July 1987, 01:59:17 UTC
- Rocket: Soyuz-U2
- Launch site: Baikonur 1/5

End of mission
- Landing date: 29 December 1987, 09:16:15 UTC
- Landing site: 140 kilometres (87 mi) NE of Arkalyk

Orbital parameters
- Reference system: Geocentric
- Regime: Low Earth
- Perigee altitude: 297 kilometres (185 mi)
- Apogee altitude: 353 kilometres (219 mi)
- Inclination: 51.6 degrees
- Period: 91.0 minutes

Docking with Mir
- Docking date: 24 July 1987, 03:31:23 UTC
- Undocking date: 29 December 1987, 05:58:00 UTC
- Soyuz programme (Crewed missions)

Soyuz TM-3 was the third crewed spaceflight to visit the Soviet space station Mir, following Soyuz T-15 and Soyuz TM-2. It was launched in July 1987, during the long duration expedition Mir EO-2, and acted as a lifeboat for the second segment of that expedition. There were three people aboard the spacecraft at launch, including the two man crew of the week-long mission Mir EP-1, consisting of Soviet cosmonaut Aleksandr Viktorenko and Syrian Muhammed Faris. Faris was the first Syrian to travel to space, and as of July 2025, the only one. The third cosmonaut launched was Aleksandr Aleksandrov, who would replace one of the long duration crew members Aleksandr Laveykin of Mir EO-2. Laveykin had been diagnosed by ground-based doctors to have minor heart problems, so he returned to Earth with the EP-1 crew in Soyuz TM-2.

Soyuz TM-3 landed near the end of December 1987, landing both members of the EO-2 crew, as well as potential Buran pilot Anatoli Levchenko, who had been launched to Mir a week earlier aboard Soyuz TM-4.

== Crew ==
Position	Launching crew	Landing crew
Commander	Aleksandr Viktorenko; Mir EP-1; First spaceflight	Yuri Romanenko; Mir EO-2; Third and last spaceflight
Flight engineer	Aleksandr Pavlovich Aleksandrov; Mir EO-2; Second and last spaceflight	
Research cosmonaut	Muhammed Faris, Syria; Mir EP-1; Only spaceflight	Anatoli Levchenko; Mir LII-1; Only spaceflight

== Mission parameters ==
- Mass: 7100 kg
- Perigee: 297 km
- Apogee: 353 km
- Inclination: 51.6°
- Period: 91.0 minutes
