= Medal "For Merit in Space Exploration" =

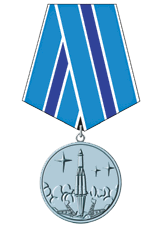
- Medal "For Merit in Space Exploration" (obverse)
- Type: State Decoration
- Awarded for: Achievements in space technology and travel
- Presented by: Russian Federation
- Eligibility: Russian citizens and foreign nationals
- Status: Active
- Established: September 7, 2010
- Ribbon of the Medal "For Merit in Space Exploration"

Precedence
- Next (higher): Medal "For Merit in the Development of Nuclear Energy"
- Next (lower): Medal of the Order of Parental Glory

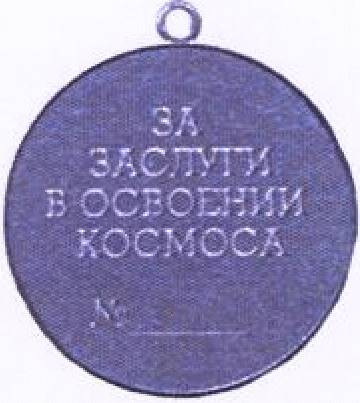
Reverse of the medal "For Merit in Space Exploration"

The Medal "For Merit in Space Exploration" (Russian: Медаль "За заслуги в освоении космоса") is a state decoration of the Russian Federation aimed at recognising achievements in the space program. It was established by presidential decree №1099 of September 7, 2010 which revamped the entire Russian awards system.

== Award statute ==
The Medal "For Merit in Space Exploration" is awarded to citizens of the Russian Federation for achievements in research, development and utilization of outer space, for a substantial contribution to the development of rocket and space technology and industry, training, research and design activities, for the implementation of international programs, as well as for other achievements in the field of space activities aimed at the comprehensive socio-economic development of the Russian Federation, at strengthening its defense and ensuring national interests, for encouraging and increasing international cooperation.

The Medal "For Merit in Space Exploration" may be awarded to foreign citizens for outstanding achievements in the development of space technology in the Russian Federation.

The Russian Federation Order of Precedence dictates the Medal "For Merit in Space Exploration" is to be worn on the left breast with other medals immediately after the Medal "For Merit in the Development of Nuclear Energy".

== Award description ==
The Medal "For Merit in Space Exploration" is a 32mm diameter circular silver medal with a raised rim on both the obverse and reverse. The obverse of the medal bears an R-7 rocket launching from its pad, two supporting towers leaning at an angle away from the rocket, to the left of the rocket, a large four pointed star, to the right of the rocket, two smaller four pointed stars. The reverse of the medal bears the inscription "FOR MERIT IN SPACE EXPLORATION" (Russian: "ЗА ЗАСЛУГИ В ОСВОЕНИИ КОСМОСА"). Below the inscription, a relief letter "N" with an horizontal line reserved for the award serial number.

The medal is secured to a standard Russian pentagonal mount by a ring through the medal suspension loop. The mount is covered by an overlapping 24mm wide silk moiré light blue ribbon with a 5mm dark blue central stripe, two white 2mm edge stripes and two 2mm white stripes separating the dark from the light blue.

== Award recipients ==
The following individuals are recipients of the Medal "For Merit in Space Exploration":

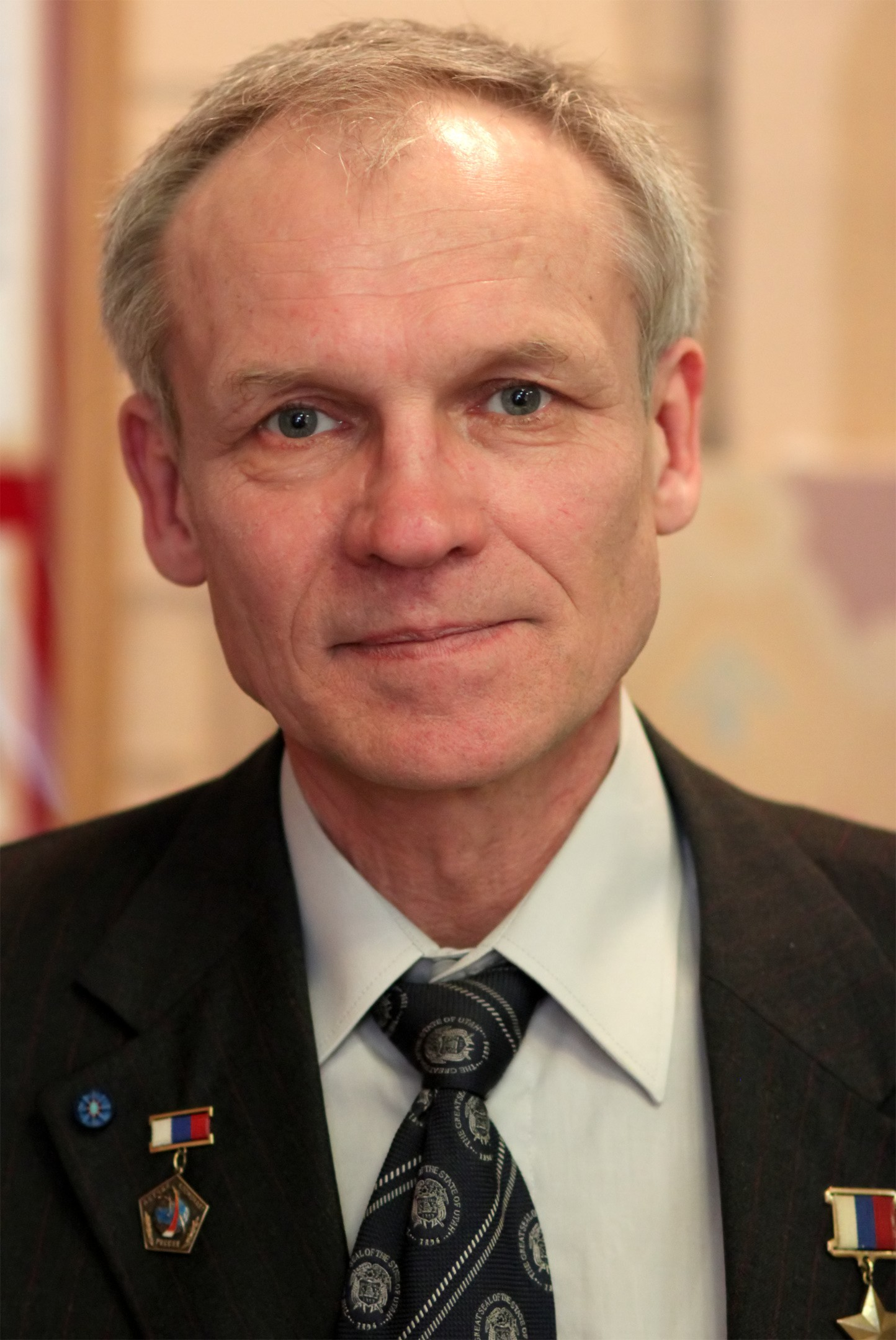
Russian cosmonaut Sergei Avdeyev

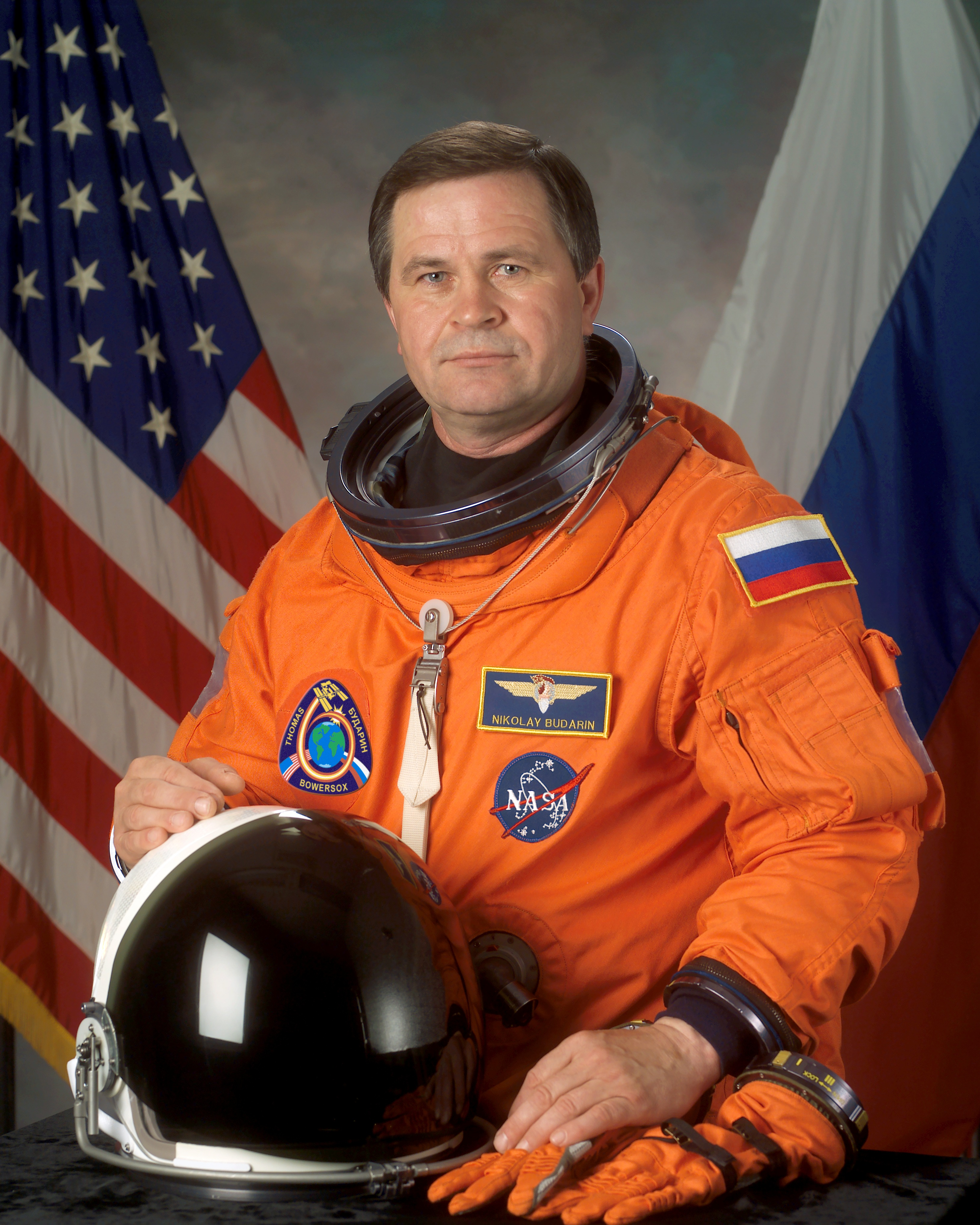
Russian cosmonaut Nikolai Mikhailovich Budarin

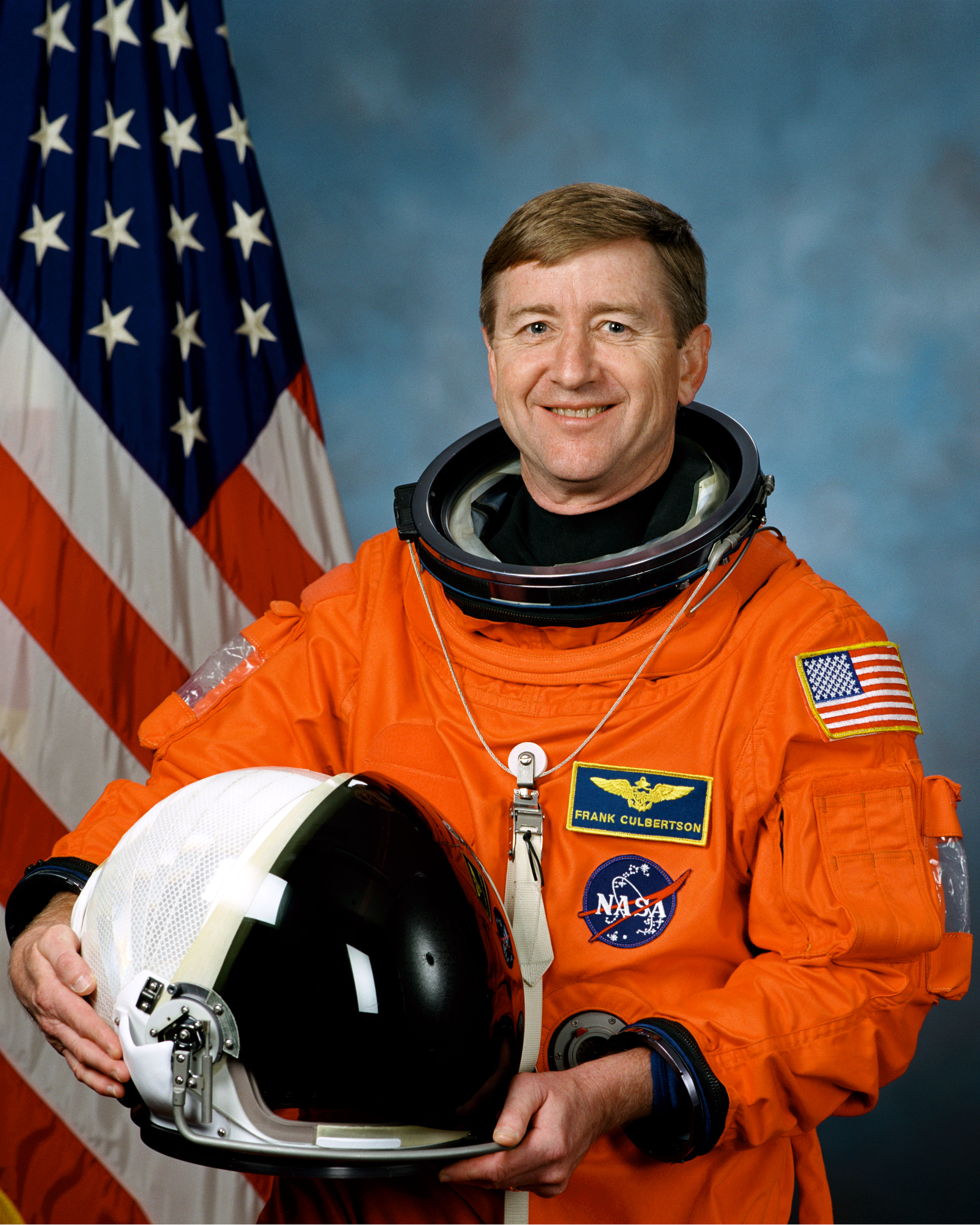
American astronaut Frank L. Culbertson, Jr.

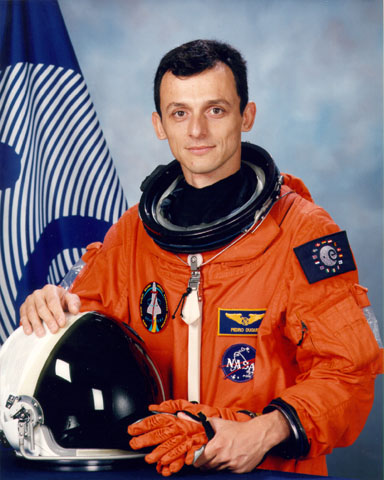
Spanish astronaut Pedro Duque

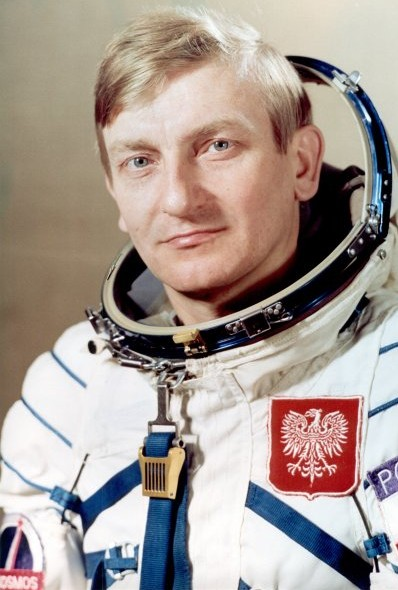
First Polish cosmonaut Mirosław Hermaszewski

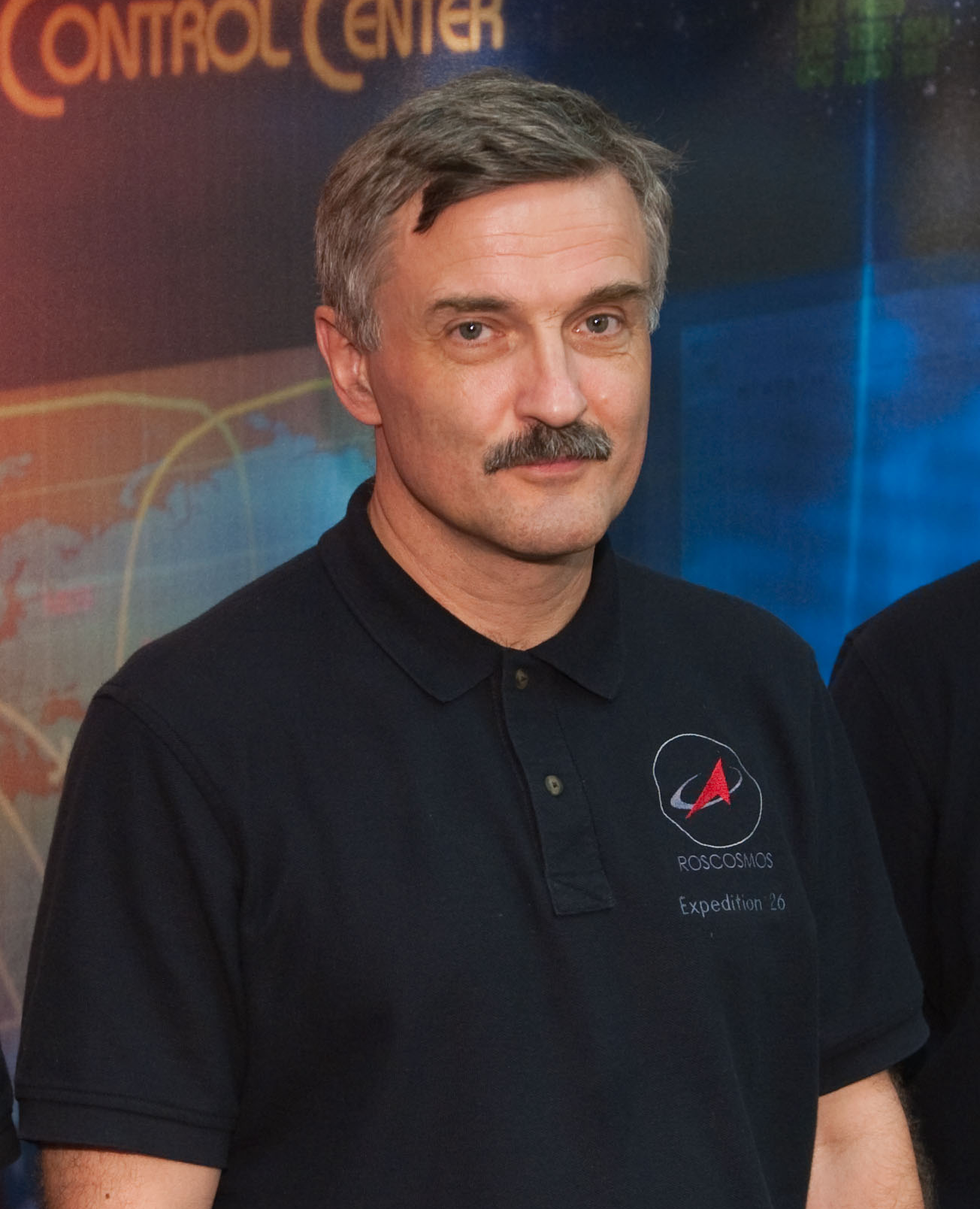
Russian cosmonaut Aleksandr Yuriyevich "Sasha" Kaleri

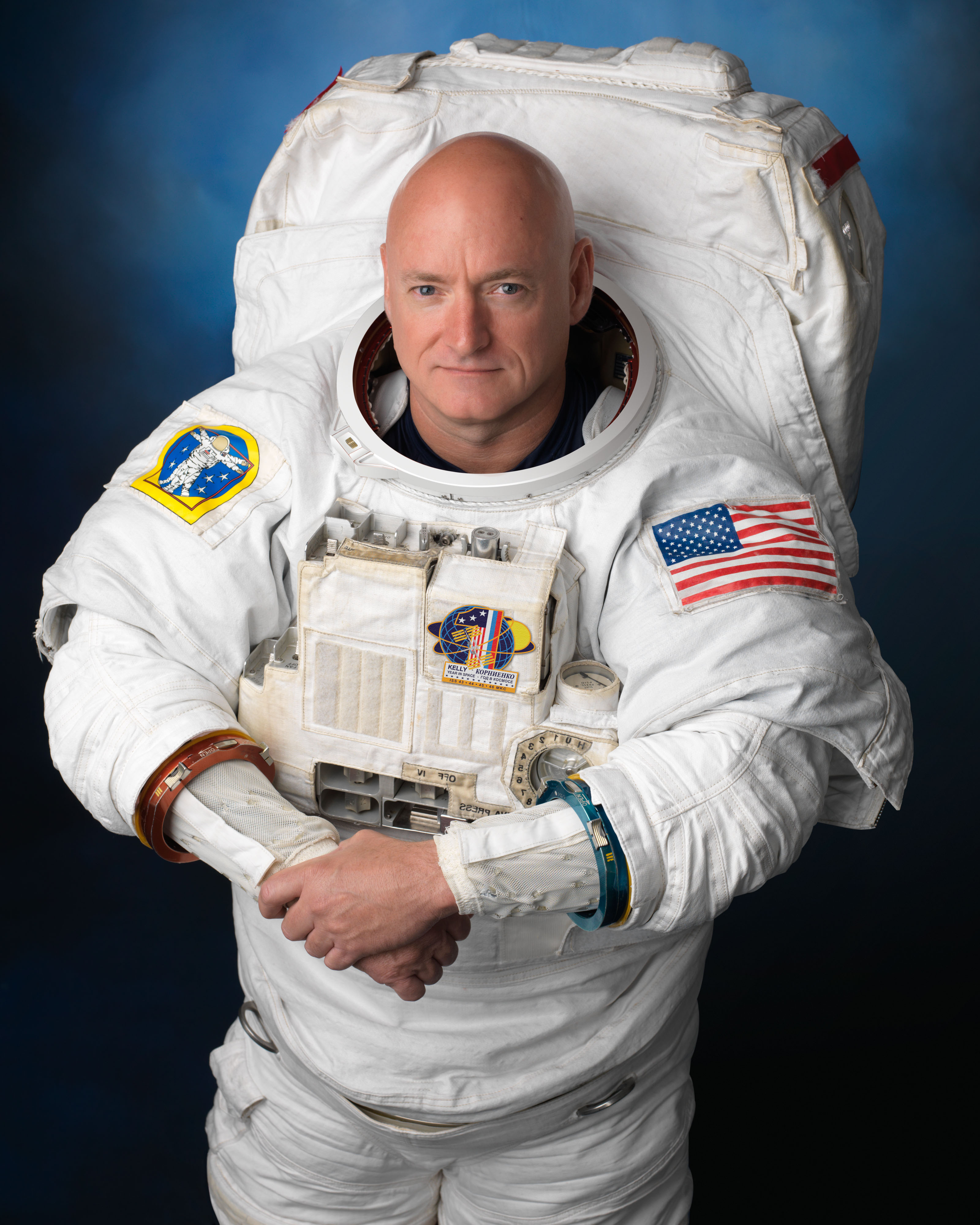
American astronaut Scott Kelly

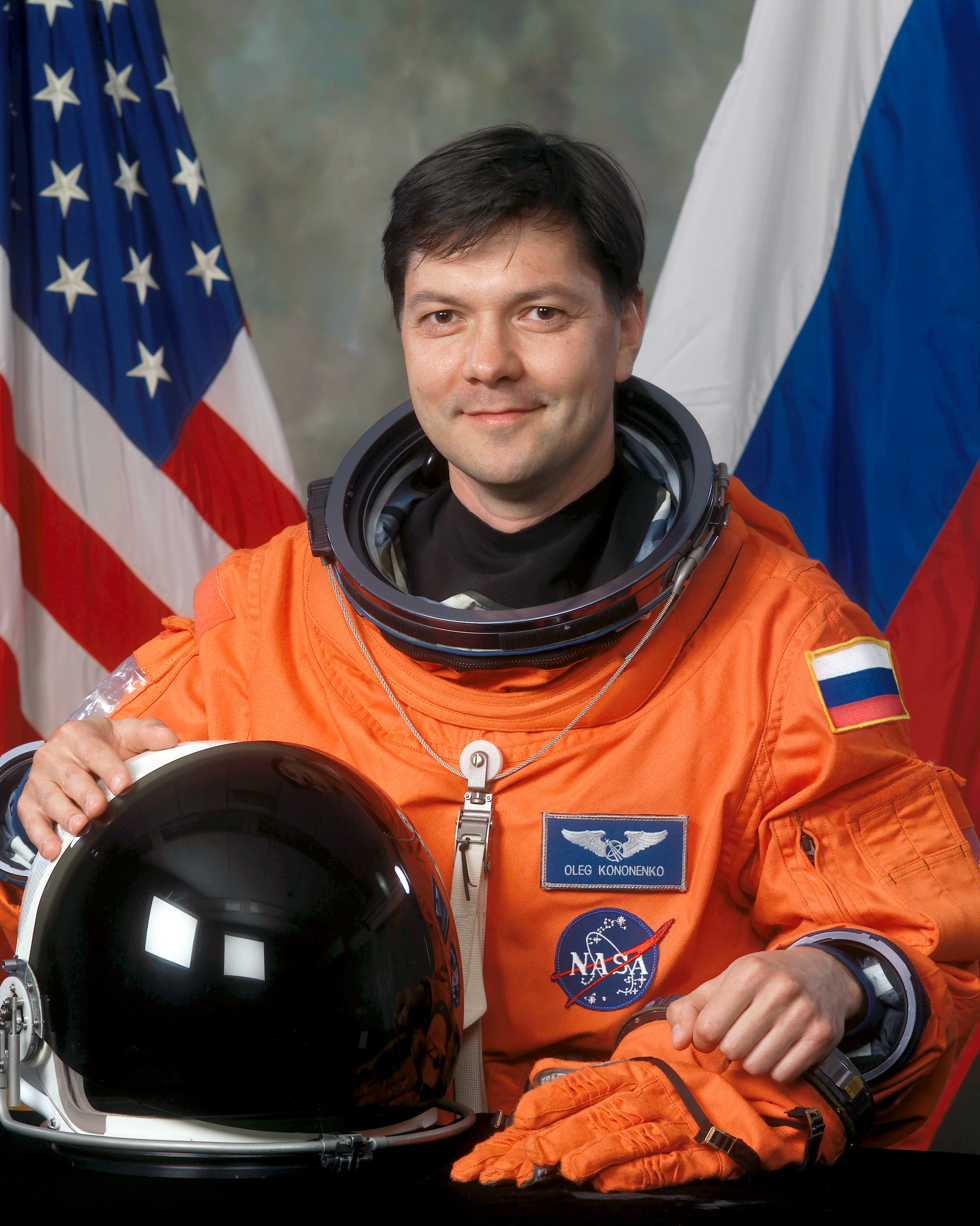
Russian cosmonaut Oleg Kononenko

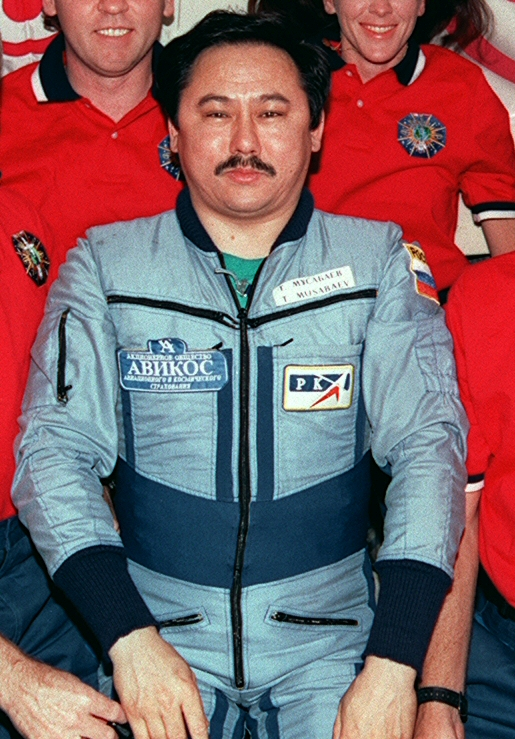
Kazakh test pilot and cosmonaut Talgat Musabayev

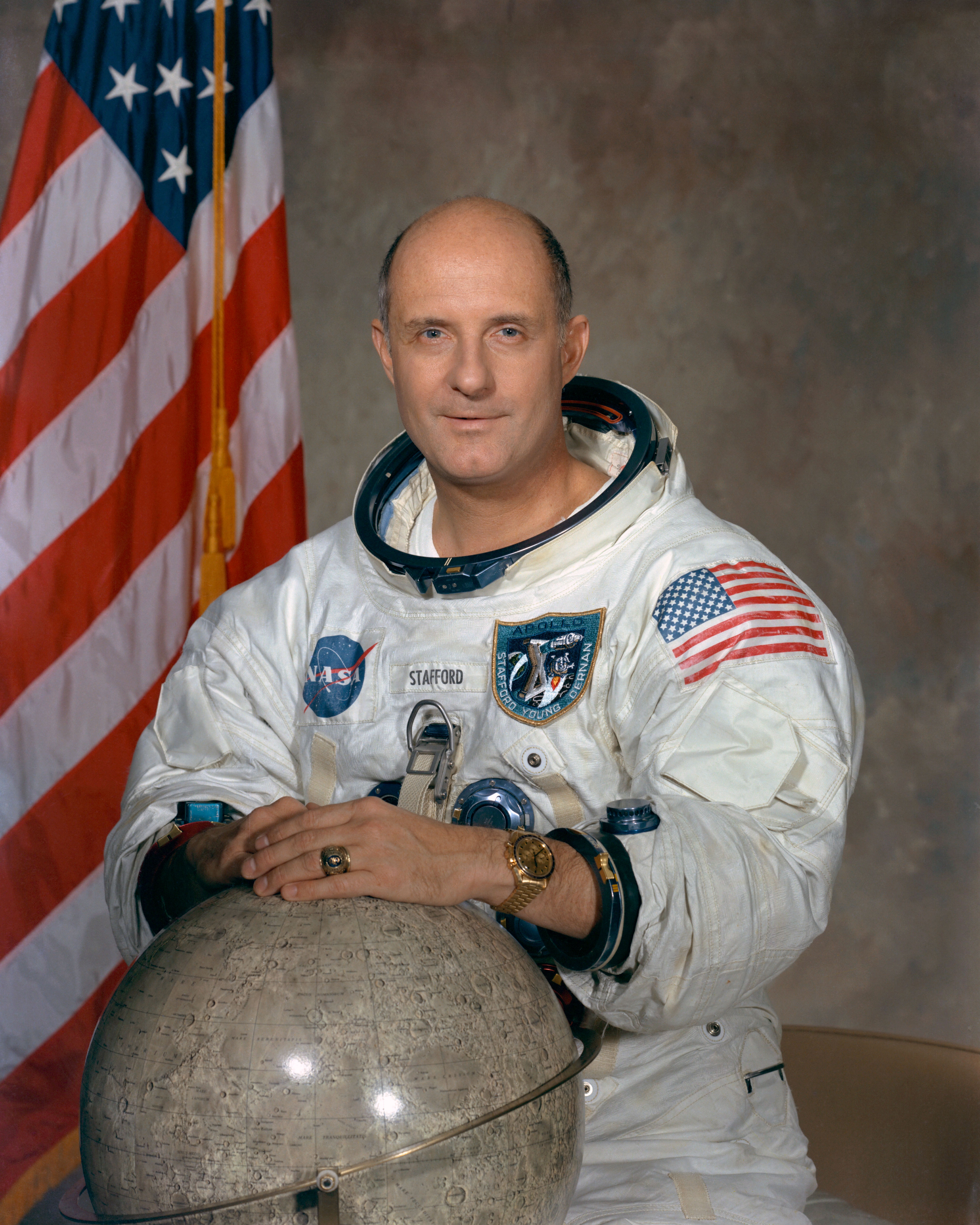
American astronaut Thomas Patten Stafford

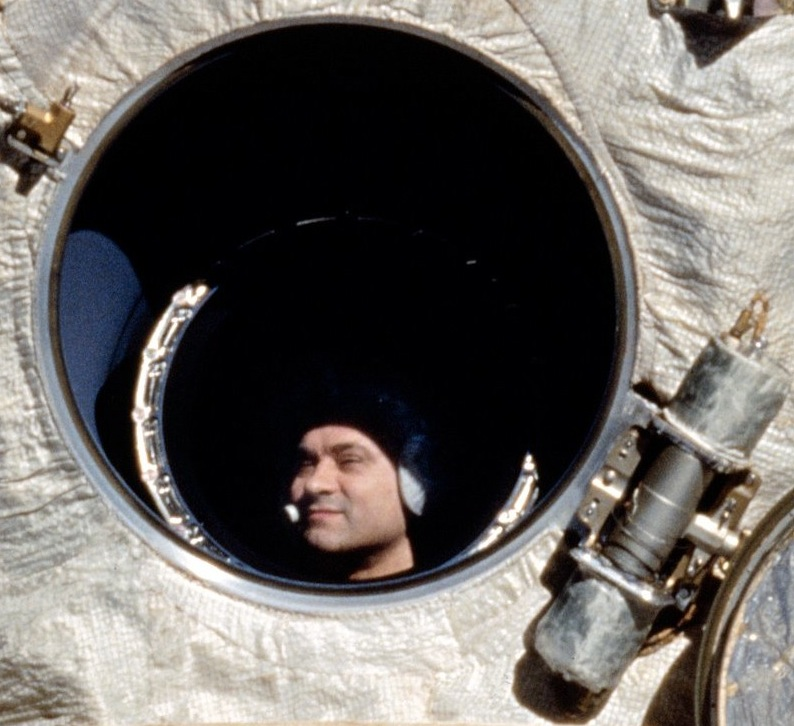
Russian cosmonaut Valeri Vladimirovich Polyakov

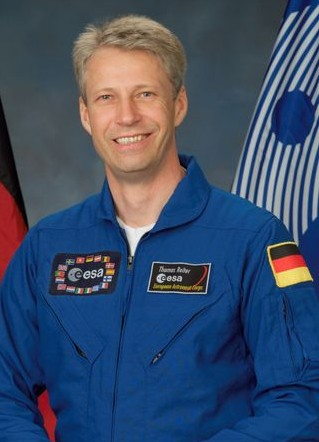
German astronaut Thomas Reiter

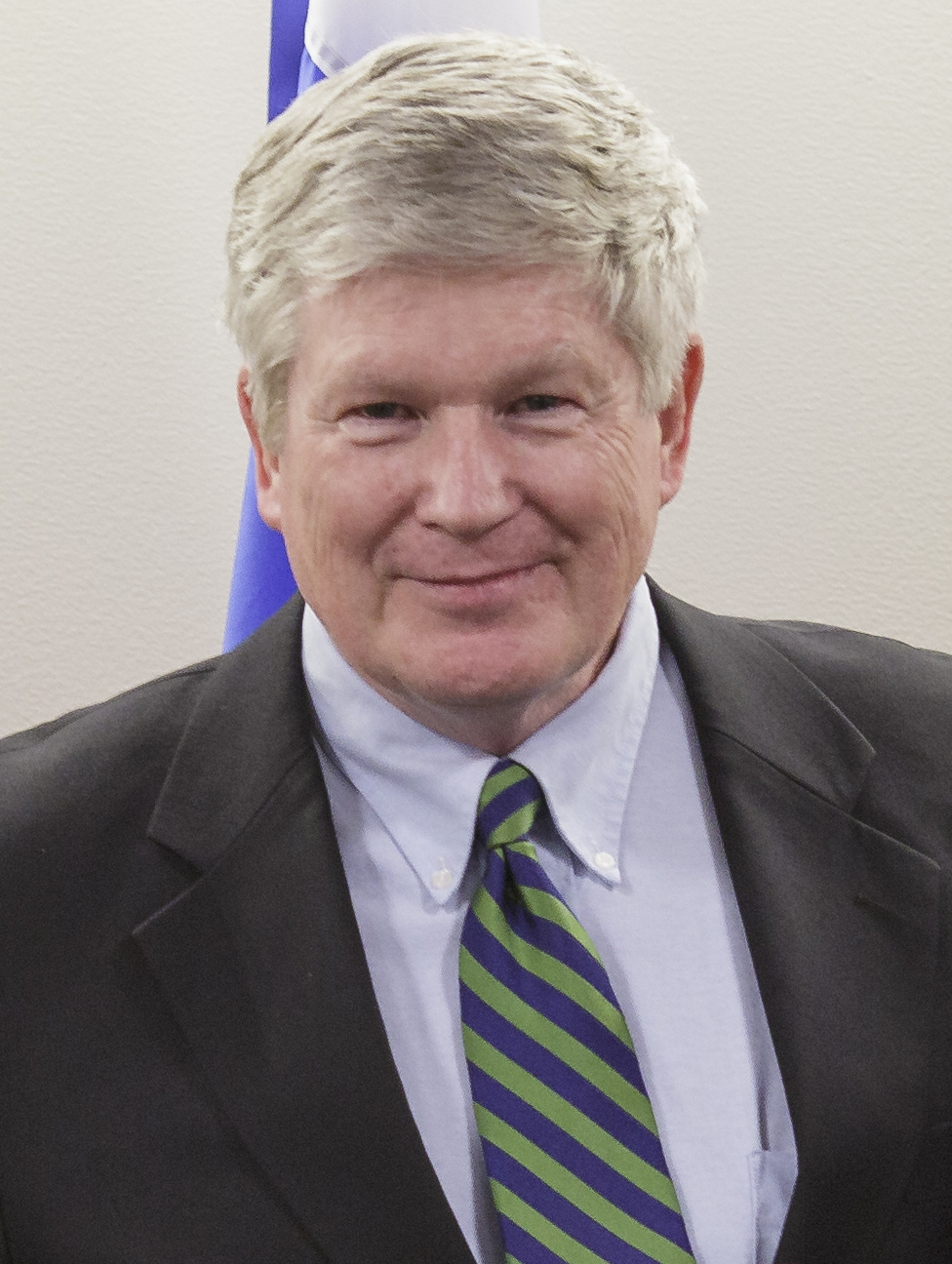
American astronaut William Shepherd

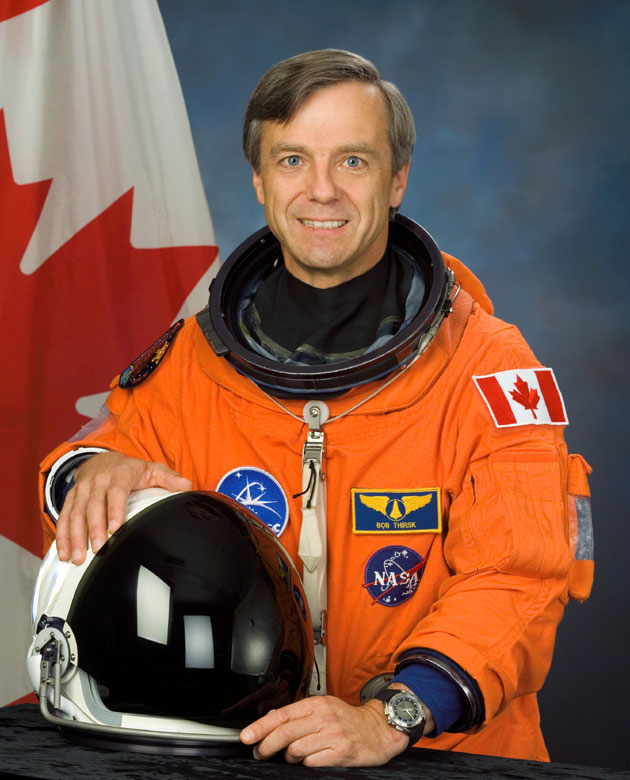
Canadian astronaut Robert Thirsk

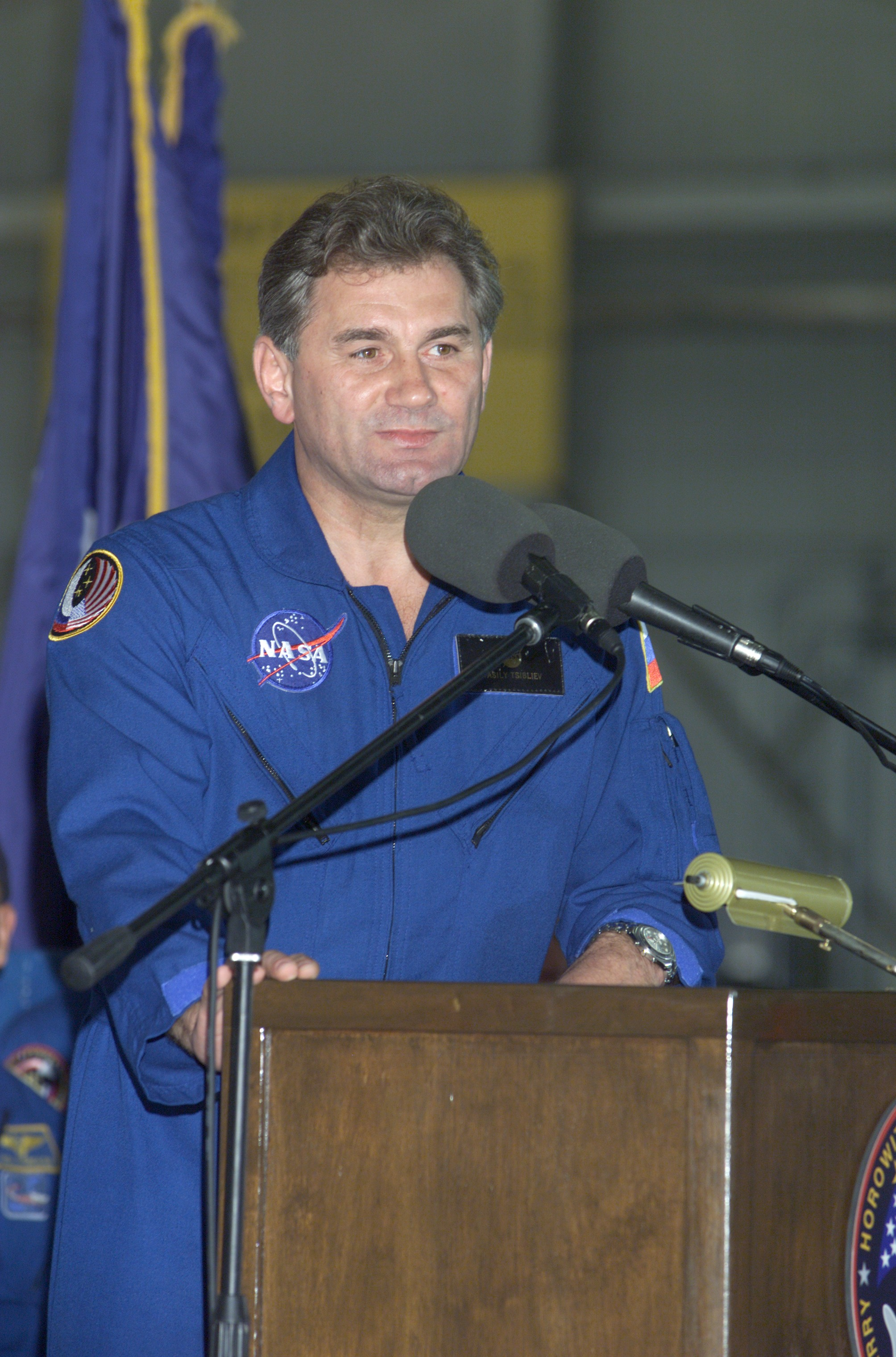
Russian cosmonaut Vasily Vasiliyevich Tsibliyev

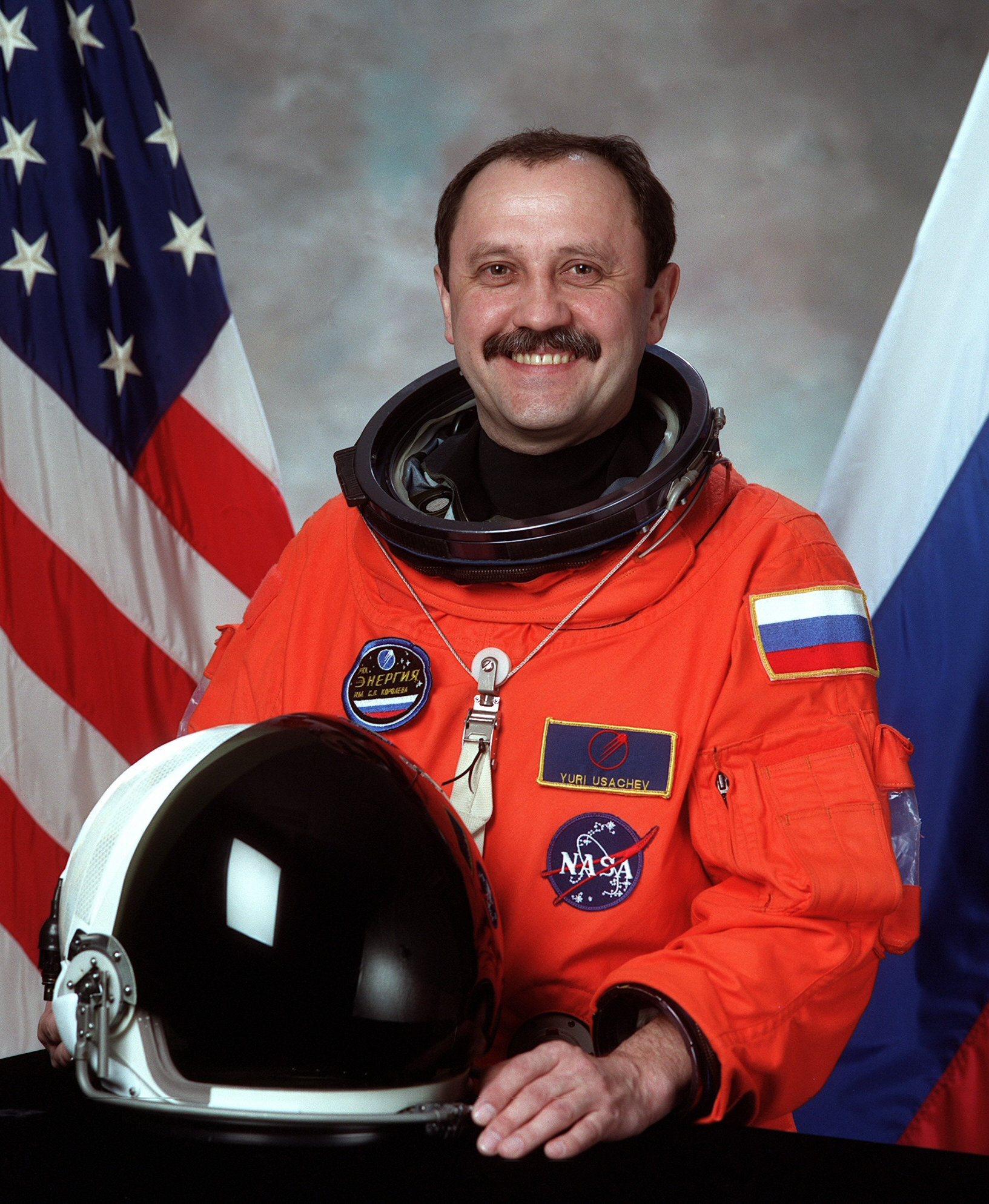
Russian cosmonaut Yury Vladimirovich Usachov

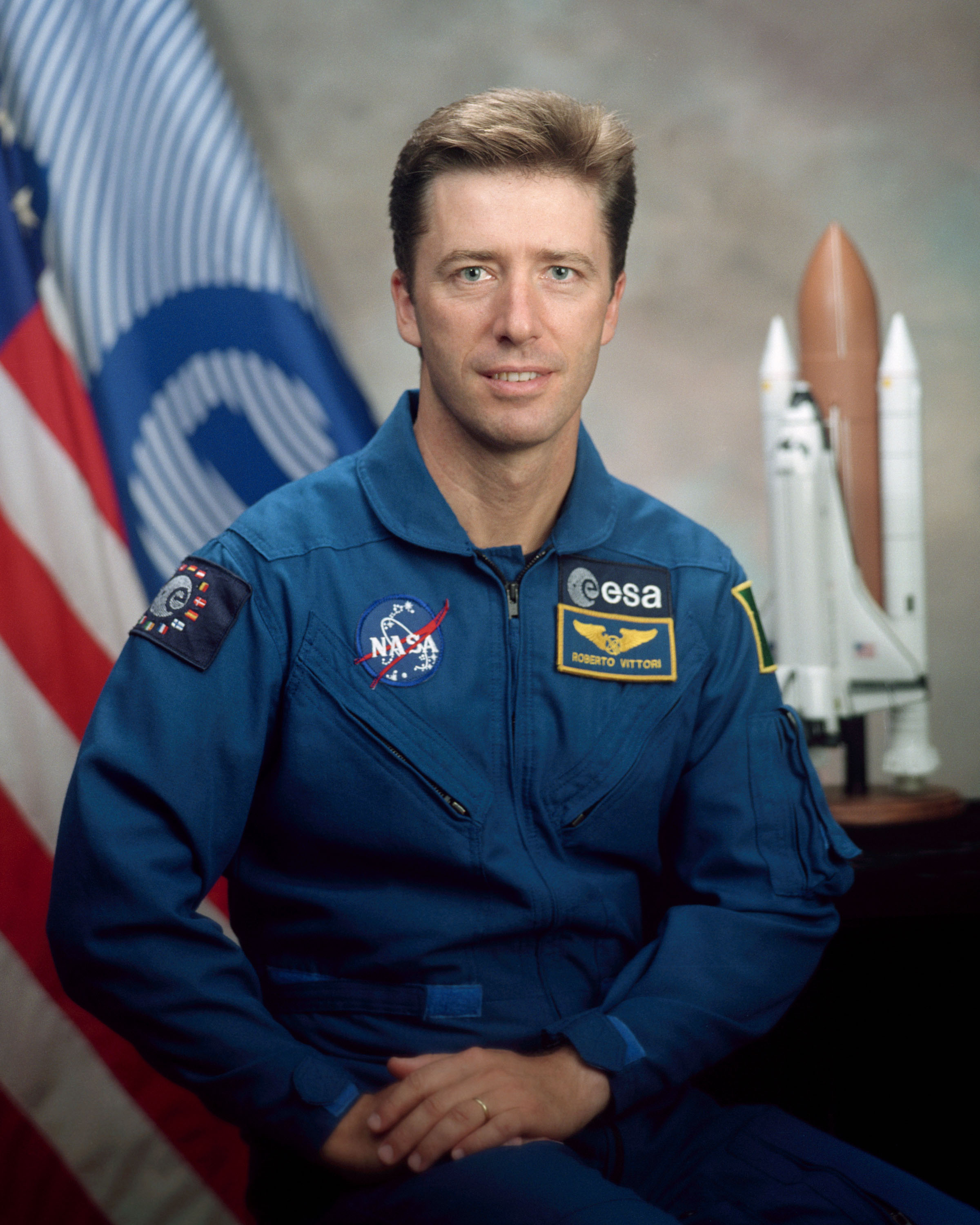
Italian astronaut Roberto Vittori

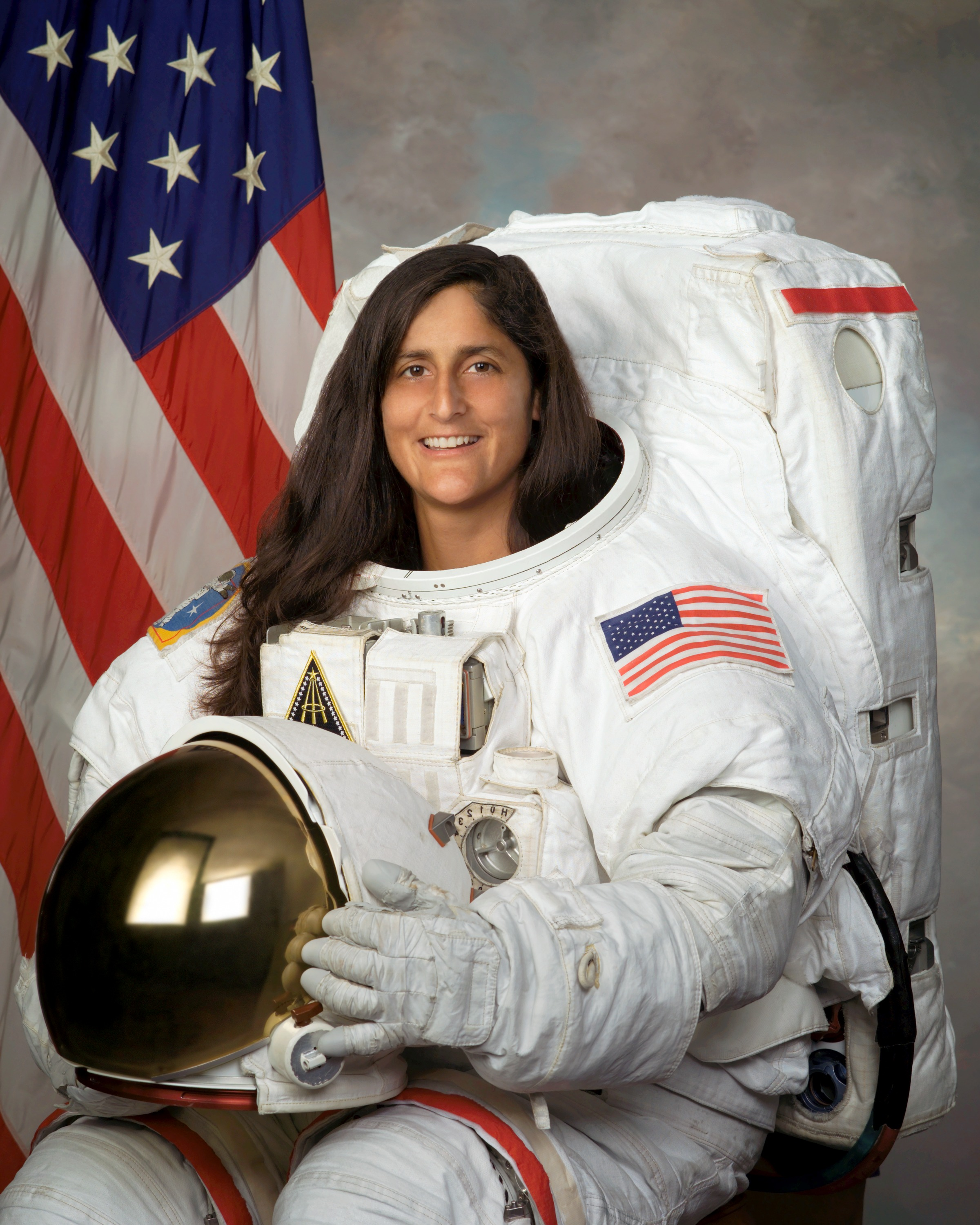
American astronaut Sunita Williams

=== Additional recipients ===
- Toyohiro Akiyama
- Vladimir Aksyonov
- Aleksandr Pavlovich Aleksandrov
- Anatoly Artsebarsky
- Oleg Atkov
- Toktar Aubakirov
- Sergey Avdeev
- Aleksandr Nikolayevich Balandin
- Boris Chertok
- Vladimir Dzhanibekov
- Muhammed Faris
- Anatoly Filipchenko
- Maidarjavyn Ganzorig
- Yuri Gidzenko
- Georgy Grechko
- Jügderdemidiin Gürragchaa
- Claudie Haigneré
- Georgi Ivanov (cosmonaut)
- Pyotr Klimuk
- Vladimir Kovalyonok
- Sergei Krikalev
- Valery Kubasov
- Aleksandr Laveykin
- Valentin Lebedev
- Vladimir Lyakhov
- Gennady Manakov
- Musa Manarov
- Phạm Tuân
- Dumitru Prunariu
- Yuri Romanenko
- Valery Rozhdestvensky
- Valery Ryumin
- Viktor Savinykh
- Svetlana Savitskaya
- Aleksandr Serebrov
- Rakesh Sharma
- Anatoly Solovyev
- Vladimir Solovyov (cosmonaut)
- Arnaldo Tamayo Méndez
- Daniel M. Tani
- Vladimir Titov (cosmonaut)
- Aleksandr Viktorenko
- Igor Volk
- Aleksandr Aleksandrovich Volkov
- Peggy Whitson
- Vitaly Zholobov
- Abdul Ahad Momand
- Vyacheslav Zudov

== See also ==
- Orders, decorations, and medals of Russia
- Order of Gagarin
- Russian Federal Space Agency
