= Soyuz TM-2 =

1987 Soviet crewed spaceflight to Mir

- COSPAR ID: 1987-013A
- SATCAT no.: 17482
- Mission duration: 174 days, 3 hours, 25 minutes, 56 seconds
- Orbits completed: ~2,810

Spacecraft properties
- Spacecraft: Soyuz 7K-STM No. 52
- Spacecraft type: Soyuz-TM
- Manufacturer: NPO Energia
- Launch mass: 7,100 kilograms (15,700 lb)

Crew
- Crew size: 2 up 3 down
- Members: Aleksandr Laveykin
- Launching: Yuri Romanenko
- Landing: Aleksandr Viktorenko; Muhammed Faris
- Callsign: Taimyr

Start of mission
- Launch date: 5 February 1987, 21:38:16 UTC
- Rocket: Soyuz-U2
- Launch site: Baikonur 1/5

End of mission
- Landing date: 30 July 1987, 01:04:12 UTC
- Landing site: 80 kilometres (50 mi) from Arkalyk

Orbital parameters
- Reference system: Geocentric
- Regime: Low Earth
- Perigee altitude: 341 kilometres (212 mi)
- Apogee altitude: 365 kilometres (227 mi)
- Inclination: 51.6 degrees
- Period: 91.6 minutes

Docking with Mir
- Docking date: 7 February 1987, 23:27:40 UTC
- Undocking date: 29 July 1987, 20:44:00 UTC
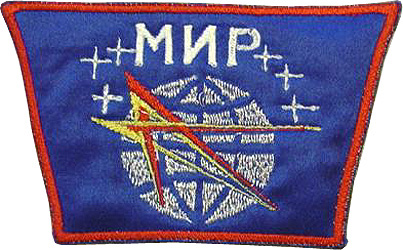
- Soyuz programme (Crewed missions)

Soyuz TM-2 was a crewed spaceflight to the Soviet space station Mir, which was uncrewed at the time. TM-2 was launched on February 5, 1987, and it was first crewed spaceflight of the Soyuz-TM spacecraft, and the second crewed spaceflight to Mir (the first being Soyuz T-15). The crew of the long duration expedition, Mir EO-2, who were launched by TM-2 consisted of Soviet cosmonauts Yuri Romanenko and Aleksandr Laveykin.

The spacecraft remained docked to Mir, functioning as a lifeboat for the EO-2 crew, until July 1987 when it returned to Earth carrying Laveykin and the two man crew of Mir EP-1. Romanenko later returned to Earth in Soyuz TM-3 at the end of EO-2.

== Crew ==
Position	Launching crew	Landing crew
Commander	Yuri Romanenko; Mir EO-2; Third and last spaceflight	Aleksandr Viktorenko; Mir EP-1; First spaceflight
Flight engineer	Aleksandr Laveykin; Mir EO-2; Only spaceflight	
Research cosmonaut	None	Muhammed Faris, Syria; Mir EP-1; Only spaceflight

== Mission parameters ==
- Mass: 7100 kg
- Perigee: 341 km
- Apogee: 365 km
- Inclination: 51.6°
- Period: 91.6 minutes

== Mission highlights ==
Early in the expedition EO-2, the module Kvant-1 was launched to automatically dock with Mir. The docking system, known as the "Igla system", was not behaving as expected. On April 5 the EO-2 crew retreated to the Soyuz TM-2 spacecraft so that they could escape in the event the module got out of control. About 200 m out, the docking system lost its lock on Mir's aft port antenna. The cosmonauts watched from within Soyuz TM-2 as the Kvant/ FSM combination passed within 10 m of the station. Following an emergency spacewalk, Kvant fully docked to the station on April 11.
