= Aleksandr Viktorenko =

Soviet cosmonaut (1947–2023)

- Александр Викторенко
- Born: 29 March 1947; Olginka, Oktyabriskiy District, North Kazakhstan Region, Kazakh SSR, USSR
- Died: 9 August 2023 (aged 76)
- Occupation: Test pilot
- Space career

Roscosmos cosmonaut
- Rank: Colonel, Russian Air Force
- Time in space: 489d 01h 33m
- Selection: 1978 Intercosmos Group
- Total EVAs: 6 (5 during Mir EO-5, 1 during Mir EO-11)
- Total EVA time: 19h, 39m
- Mission: Soyuz TM-3/2 (Mir EP-1), Soyuz TM-8 (Mir EO-5), Soyuz TM-14 (Mir EO-11), Soyuz TM-20 (Mir EO-17)
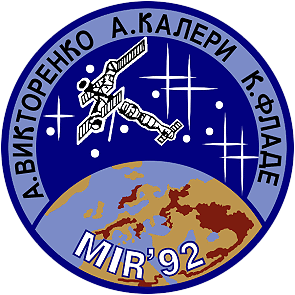
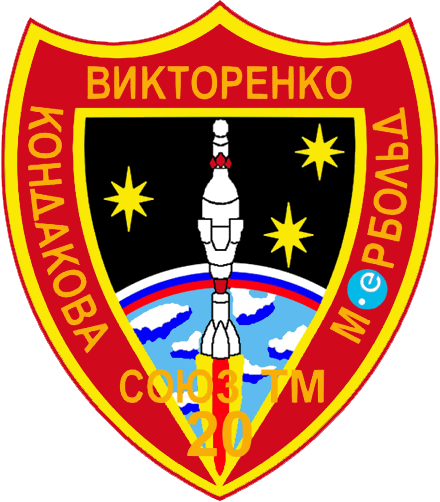
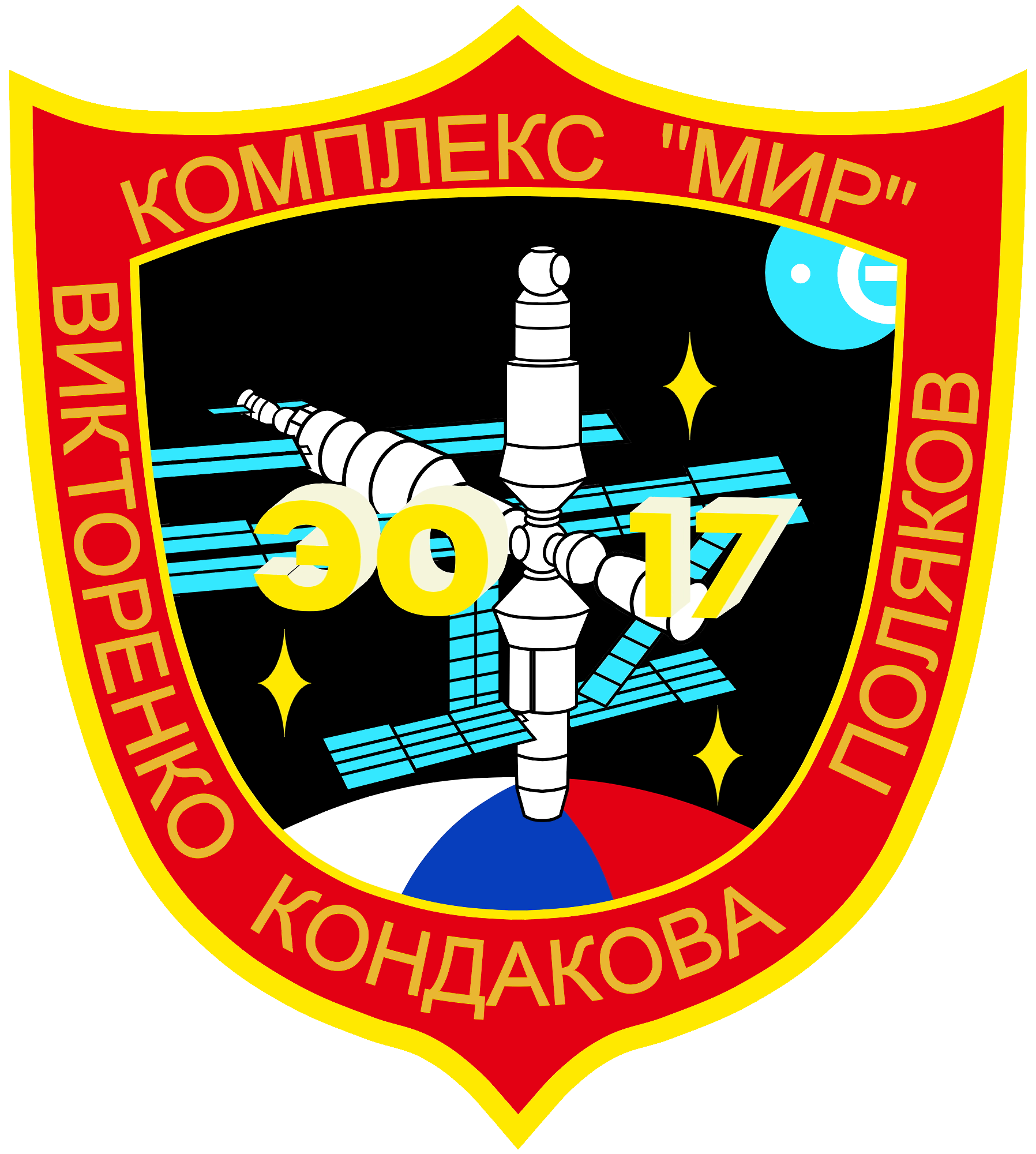
- Mission insignia

Aleksandr Stepanovich Viktorenko (Russian: Александр Степанович Викторенко; 29 March 1947 – 9 August 2023) was a Soviet and Russian cosmonaut.

Viktorenko was selected as a cosmonaut on 23 March 1978 and retired on 30 May 1997. He was commander of Soyuz TM-3, Soyuz TM-8, Soyuz TM-14, and Soyuz TM-20. He spent a total of 489 days in space. He also served as backup commander for Soyuz T-14, Soyuz T-15, Soyuz TM-7, Soyuz TM-13, and Soyuz TM-19.

== Early and personal life ==
Viktorenko was born in Olginka in the Kazakh SSR, and graduated from the Advanced School of Military Aviation in Orenburg in 1969. He joined the Soviet Air Forces and attained the rank of Colonel, serving as a test pilot. He married Raisa Ivanovna Lysenko and had two children.

== Career ==
Viktorenko was selected for the Roscosmos Cosmonaut Corps in 1978, but a training accident in an altitude chamber resulted in unconsciousness for 17 hours, burns, and a concussion, delaying his first spaceflight by two years.

He commanded the 1987 Soyuz TM-3 mission to the space station Mir, during which he and his crew were the first crew to depart the station on a different craft from that on which they arrived; they returned to Earth on Soyuz TM-2.

Viktorenko's first long-duration mission was to command Soyuz TM-8 in 1989 as part of Mir EO-5. During its final approach to Mir, the Kurs docking navigation system malfunctioned and Viktorenko took manual control of the docking. The primary purpose of the mission was the installation of the Kvant-2 module, which required Viktorenko and fellow cosmonaut Aleksandr Serebrov to take manual control of Mir, allowing the module to be docked and installed by the Lyappa robotic arm. Viktorenko also conducted five spacewalks during Mir EO-5; the last of these was to test the SPK manoeuvring unit.

Viktorenko was again the commander of Soyuz TM-14 in 1992, the first Russian space mission following the dissolution of the Soviet Union. Viktorenko conducted his sixth and final spacewalk during the mission, to repair a stabilizing gyroscope on the station.

Viktorenko's final spaceflight was Soyuz TM-20 in 1994 as part of the European Space Agency's Euromir 94 mission, during which Viktorenko had to again manually dock the spacecraft due to unexpected yawing. As part of the mission, he greeted the crew of STS-63, the first American Space Shuttle mission to rendezvous with Mir. The Russian tradition of Russian Orthodox priests blessing cosmonauts on launch day was initiated by Viktorenko when he requested one for the launch of Soyuz TM-20.

== Retirement and death ==
Following his final return from space, Viktorenko retired to become an instructor at the Yuri Gagarin Cosmonaut Training Center.

Viktorenko died on 9 August 2023, at the age of 76. He was buried at the Federal Military Memorial Cemetery on 12 August.

== Honours and awards ==
- Hero of the Soviet Union
- Order of Merit for the Fatherland, 3rd class (10 April 1995) for their courage and heroism displayed during prolonged space flight on the orbital scientific research complex Mir
- Order of Friendship of Peoples (11 August 1992) for the successful implementation of long-duration space flight on the orbital station Mir and displaying courage and heroism
- Order of Lenin
- Order of the October Revolution (19 February 1990) for the successful implementation of spaceflight on the orbital scientific research complex Mir and displaying courage and heroism
- Medal "For Merit in Space Exploration" (12 April 2011) for the great achievements in the field of research, development, and use of outer space, many years of diligent work, and public activities
- Commander of the Legion of Honour (March 1999), previously an officer (1988)
- Pilot-cosmonaut of the Soviet Union
