= Muhammed Faris =

Syrian military aviator and cosmonaut (1951–2024)

- محمد فارس
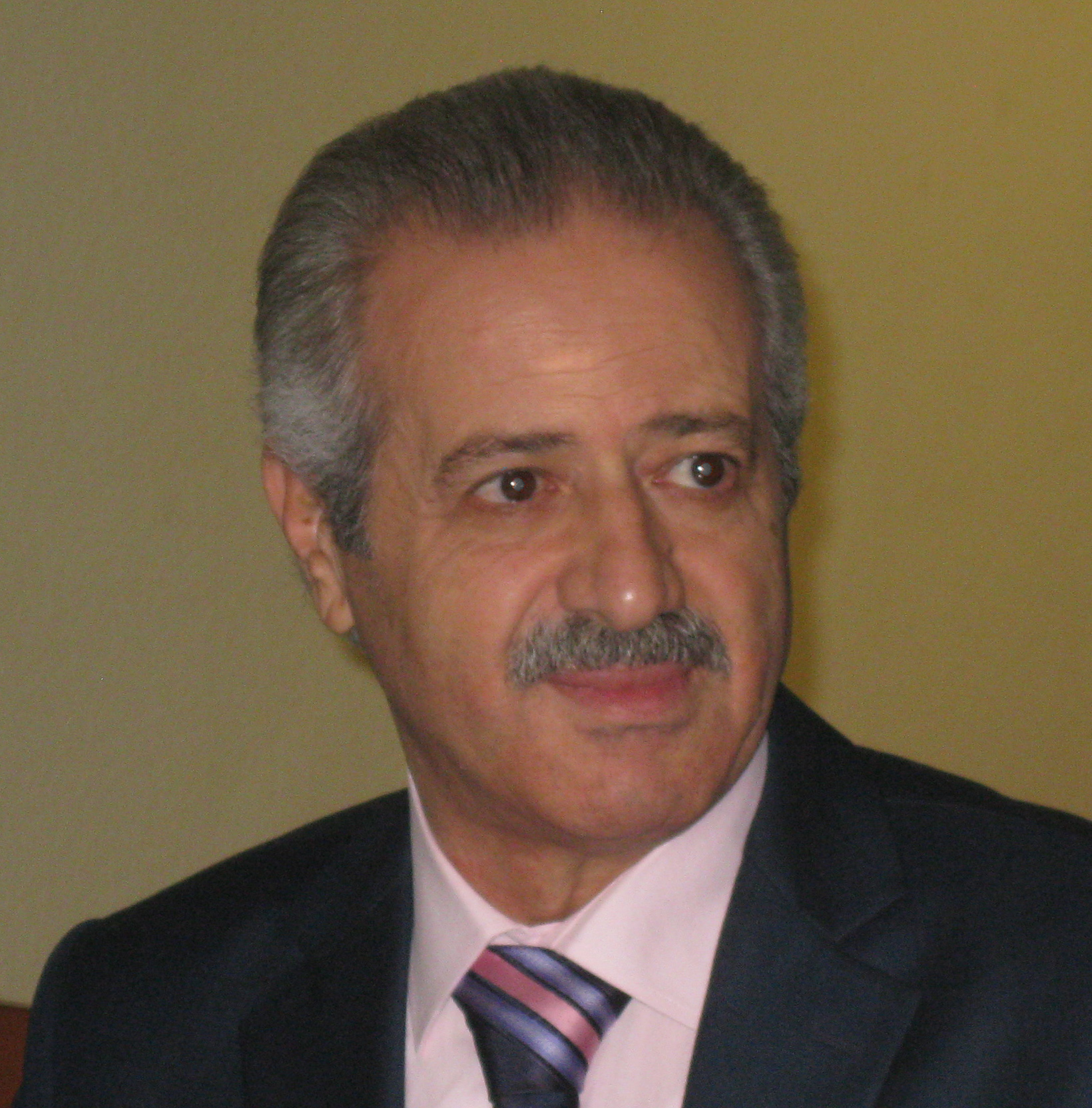
- Faris in 2012
- Born: 26 May 1951; Aleppo, Syria
- Died: 19 April 2024 (aged 72); Gaziantep, Turkey
- Resting place: Azaz, Aleppo Governorate, Syria
- Other name: Muhammed Ahmed Adas
- Occupation: Pilot
- Awards: Hero of the Soviet Union; Order of Lenin; Medal "For Merit in Space Exploration"
- Space career

Interkosmos Research Cosmonaut
- Rank: General, Syrian Air Force
- Time in space: 7d 23h 04min
- Selection: 1985 Intercosmos Group
- Missions: Mir EP-1 (Soyuz TM-3 / Soyuz TM-2)
- Mission insignia

Muhammed Ahmed Faris (Arabic: محمد أحمد فارس, romanized: Muḥammad ʾAḥmad Fāris; 26 May 1951 – 19 April 2024) was a Syrian military aviator and astronaut. He was the first Syrian and the second Arab in space.

== Career ==
Born in Aleppo, Syria, he was a pilot in the Syrian Air Force with the rank of colonel. He specialized in navigation when he was selected to participate in the Interkosmos spaceflight program on 30 September 1985.

Faris flew as Research Cosmonaut in the Interkosmos program on Soyuz TM-3 to the Mir space station in July 1987, spending 7 days, 23 hours, and 5 minutes in space. He returned to Earth aboard Soyuz TM-2.

Faris is credited with carrying the first recorded Earth dirt into space, which was a vial carrying soil from Damascus.

Faris was awarded the title Hero of the Soviet Union on 30 July 1987; he was also awarded the Order of Lenin.

After his spaceflight, Faris returned to the Syrian Air Force and lived in Aleppo.

=== Syrian civil war ===
On 4 August 2012, during the Syrian civil war, Faris defected from Bashar al-Assad's regime and joined the armed opposition.

On 13 September 2012, he had an exclusive interview with Al Aan TV and covered many topics regarding the ongoing civil war in Syria. Faris was also part of the National Coordination Committee for Democratic Change, an anti-Assad grouping.

In a March 2016 interview as a Syrian refugee in Turkey, Faris stated regarding the ongoing civil war: "I tell Europe if you don't want refugees, then you should help us get rid of this regime," adding "I am very sorry about the Russian interference, which has stood on the side of dictator Bashar Assad, and has begun to kill the Syrian people with their planes".

In September 2017, Faris was appointed Defense Minister of the Syrian Interim Government, a self-appointed opposition grouping.

== Personal life ==
Faris moved with his family to Turkey in 2012 as a result of the Syrian civil war. He obtained Turkish citizenship in 2020. Faris had five children: four boys and one girl.

== Death ==
Faris was admitted to Sanko Hospital in the Turkish province of Gaziantep after a heart attack in March 2024. He died on 19 April 2024 at the age of 72 and was buried in the rebel held city of Azaz in Northern Syria.

== See also ==
- List of Muslim astronauts
- List of Arab astronauts
