= Aleksandr Laveykin =

Soviet cosmonaut (born 1951)

- Александр Лавейкин
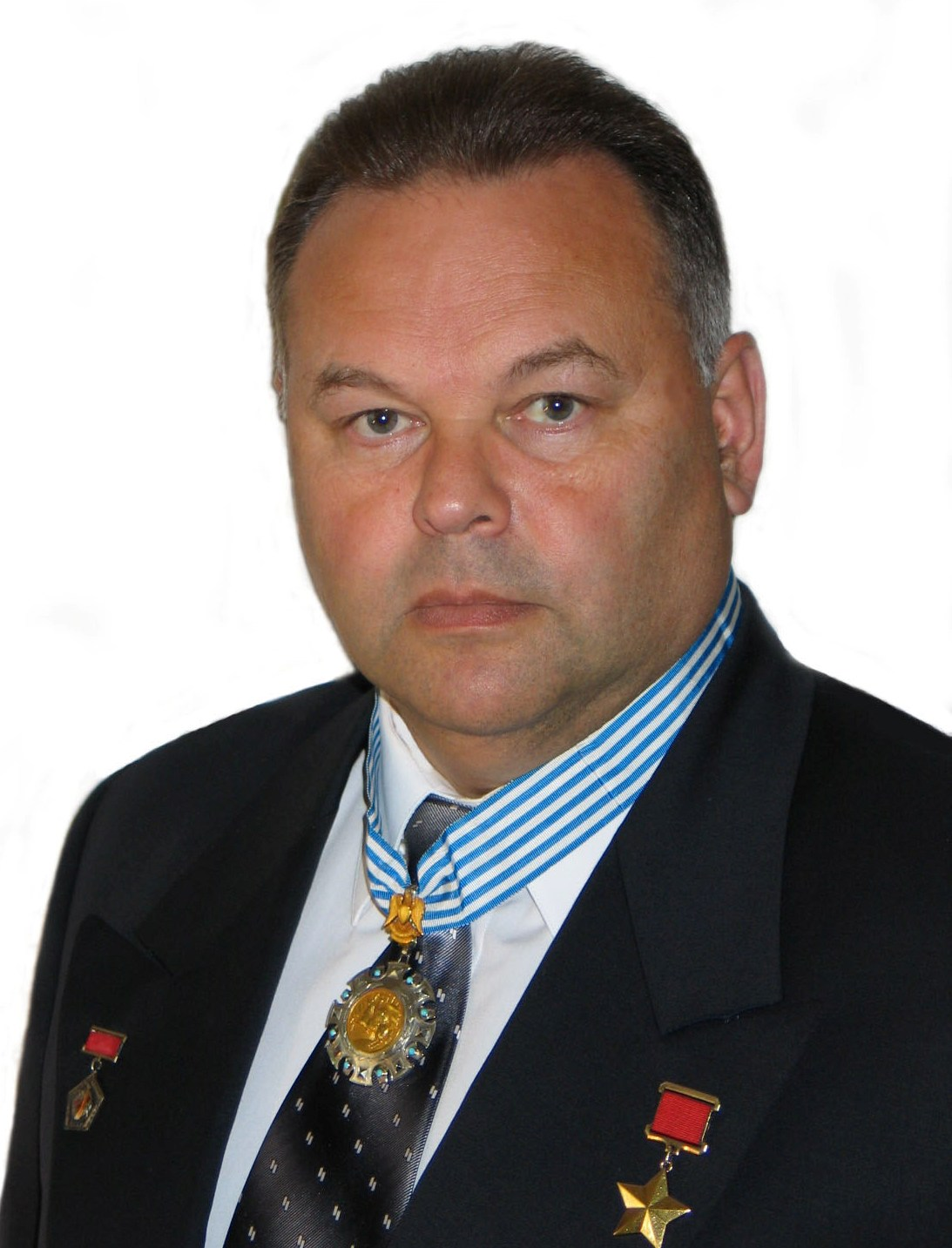
- Born: 21 April 1951 (age 75); Moscow, USSR
- Occupation: Flight engineer
- Awards: Hero of the Soviet Union; Order of Lenin; Medal "For Merit in Space Exploration"
- Space career

Cosmonaut
- Status: Retired
- Time in space: 174d 03h 25m
- Selection: 1978 Cosmonaut Group
- Total EVAs: 3
- Total EVA time: 8h, 48m
- Missions: Soyuz TM-2 (Mir EO-2)

Aleksandr Ivanovich Laveykin (Russian: Александр Иванович Лавейкин; born April 21, 1951) is a retired Soviet cosmonaut.

== Biography ==
Born in Moscow, Laveykin was selected as a cosmonaut on December 1, 1978. He flew on one spaceflight, for the first part of the long duration expedition Mir EO-2. He flew as a flight engineer, and was both launched and landed with the spacecraft Soyuz TM-2. He spent 174 days 3 hours 25 minutes in space. Married with one child, Laveykin retired on March 28, 1994.

Launched in February 1987, his spaceflight was intended to last until December 1987, but doctors on the ground determined that he was having minor heart irregularities. For this reason, in July he was replaced by Soviet cosmonaut Aleksandr Pavlovich Aleksandrov, who stayed on Mir to the end of the expedition in December.

== Awards ==
- Hero of the Soviet Union
- Pilot-Cosmonaut of the USSR
- Order of Lenin and the Russian Federation Medal "For Merit in Space Exploration"
