= Aleksandr Pavlovich Aleksandrov =

Soviet cosmonaut (born 1943)

Aleksandr Aleksandrov
- Александр Александров
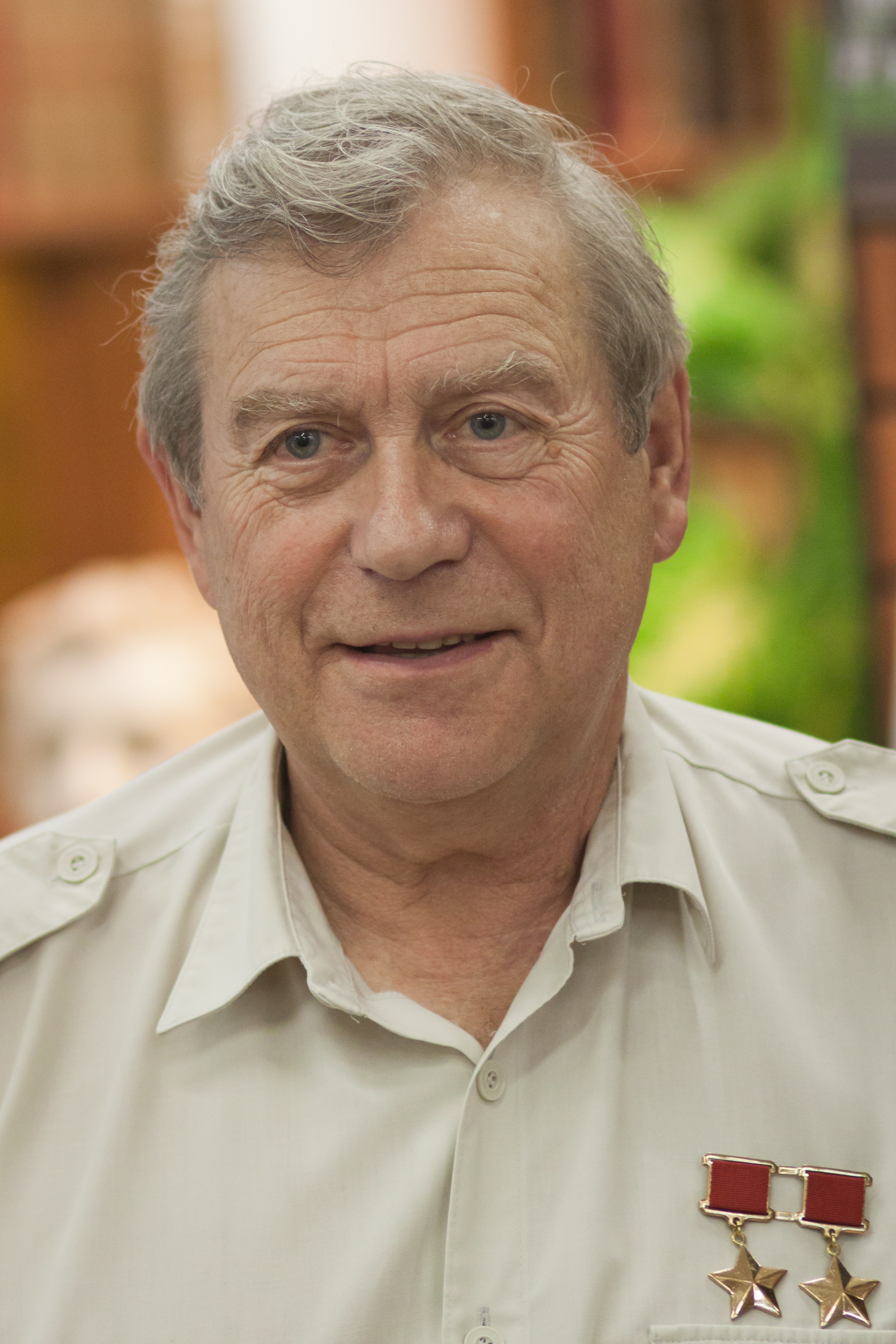
- Born: 20 February 1943 (age 83); Moscow, Soviet Union
- Occupation: Flight engineer
- Awards: Hero of the Soviet Union (2); Pilot-Cosmonaut of the USSR; Order of Lenin (2); Medal "For Merit in Space Exploration"
- Space career

Cosmonaut
- Status: Retired
- Time in space: 309d 18h 02m
- Selection: 1978 Intercosmos Group
- Missions: Salyut 7 EO-2 (Soyuz T-9), Mir EO-2 (Soyuz TM-3)

Aleksandr Pavlovich Aleksandrov (Russian: Александр Павлович Александров; born February 20, 1943) is a former Soviet cosmonaut and twice Hero of the Soviet Union (November 23, 1983, and December 29, 1987).

== Biography ==
Born in Moscow, Russia, he graduated from Moscow Bauman-Highschool in 1969 with a doctorate degree, specialised on spacecraft steering systems.

He was selected as cosmonaut on December 1, 1978. For his first spaceflight, he flew as Flight Engineer on Soyuz T-9, which lasted from June to November 1983. For his second spaceflight, he replaced one of the long-duration crew members of Mir EO-2. For the spaceflight, he was launched with the spacecraft Soyuz TM-3 in July 1987, and landed with the same spacecraft in December 1987. All together he spent 309 days, 18 hours, 2 minutes in space. He served as backup for Soyuz T-8, Soyuz T-13, and Soyuz T-15.

He resigned from the cosmonaut team on October 26, 1993, when he became chief of NPOE Cosmonaut-group; since 1996 he is Chief flight test directorate of RKKE. He is married with two children.

== Honours and awards ==
- Twice Hero of the Soviet Union
- Pilot-Cosmonaut of the USSR
- Two Orders of Lenin
- Medal "For Merit in Space Exploration" (Russian Federation)
