= Mir EO-2 =

Second expedition to Mir space station

- Mission type: Mir expedition
- Mission duration: 326 days (Romanenko) (launch to landing)

Expedition
- Space station: Mir
- Began: 5 February 1987, 21:38:03 UTC
- Ended: 29 December 1987, 09:16:00 UTC
- Arrived aboard: Soyuz TM-2; Alexandrov: Soyuz TM-3
- Departed aboard: Soyuz TM-3; Laveykin: Soyuz TM-2

Crew
- Crew size: Two
- Members: Yuri Romanenko; Aleksandr Laveykin; Aleksandr Aleksandrov
- Callsign: Tamyr
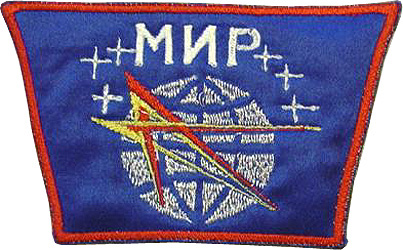
- Long-term Mir expeditions

Mir EO-2 (also called Mir Principal Expedition 2) was the second long duration expedition to the Soviet space station Mir, and it lasted from February to December 1987. The mission was divided into two parts (sometimes called (a) and (b)), the division occurring when one of the two crew members, Aleksandr Laveykin, was replaced part way through the mission by Aleksandr Aleksandrov. Laveykin was replaced because ground-based doctors had diagnosed him with minor heart problems.

== Background ==
The core module or Mir had been launched into orbit on 19 February 1986. It had been visited twice by the crew of Soyuz T-15, between March and July 1986, who transferred equipment from the previous Soviet space station Salyut 7. Prior to the arrival of EO-2, Mir was also visited by three Progress spacecraft, numbered 25, 26, and 27, as well as an uncrewed Soyuz-TM spacecraft, designated TM-1. From July 1986 to the arrival of EO-2 in February, Mir remained uncrewed. During this time an associated relay satellite ceased operation, and computers on Mir were malfunctioning.

Progress 27 docked with the station on 18 January, and was still there when the EO-2 crew arrived. On 26 January, the Progress spacecraft boosted the station's mean altitude by 16 km to 345 km.

== Crew ==
The crew from February to July 1987, consisted of Commander Yuri Romanenko, and Flight Engineer Aleksandr Laveykin. From July to December 1987 the crew consisted of Romanenko and Aleksandr Aleksandrov.

Mir EO-2	Name	Spaceflight	Launch	Landing	Duration	Notes
Flight Engineer	(Soviet Union) Aleksandr Laveykin	First	5 February 1987; Soyuz TM-2	30 July 1987; Soyuz TM-2	174 days	
Commander	(Soviet Union) Yuri Romanenko	Third	5 February 1987; Soyuz TM-2	29 December 1987; Soyuz TM-3	326 days	Record spaceflight duration
Flight Engineer	(Soviet Union) Aleksandr Aleksandrov	Second	22 July 1987; Soyuz TM-3	29 December 1987; Soyuz TM-3	160 days	

EO-2 was originally planned to consist of Aleksandr Serebrov and Vladimir Titov, but shortly before the launch of Soyuz TM-2 to start the expedition, the crew was changed to Romanenko and Laveykin, possibly due to illness. Titov and Serebrov were listed as the backup crew for the mission.

== Mission highlights ==
The launch of Romanenko and Laveykin aboard TM-2 was broadcast live on TV; it was a night launch which occurred at about 1:30am local time. It was the first crewed launch of the new Soyuz-TM spacecraft.

=== Kvant docking ===
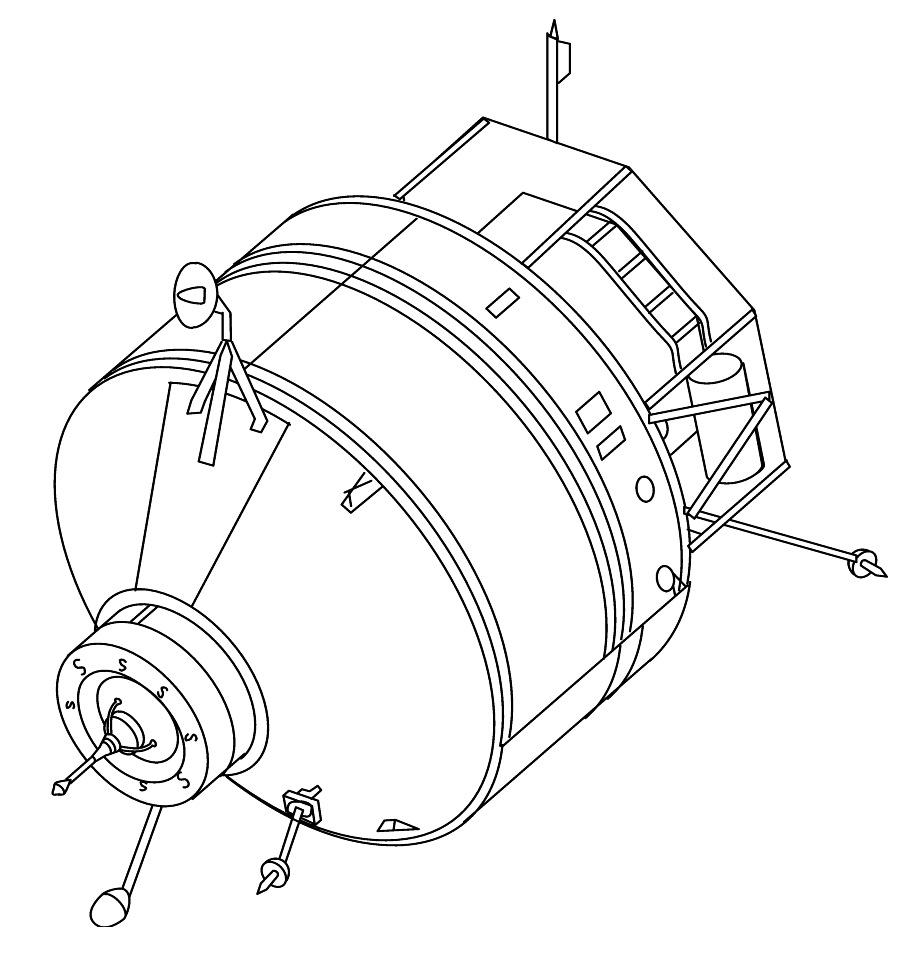
A drawing of the Kvant-1 module (without the Functional Service Module).

On 30 March 1987, the module Kvant-1 was launched; it was the second module of the space station Mir, and would add 40 m^{3} of pressurized volume to Mir, bringing the total to about 130 m^{3}. Attached to Kvant-1 was a Functional Service Module (FSM), which contained propellants, and was used to direct the module to Mir. At launch, the Kvant module had a mass of 11 tonnes, and the FSM had a mass of 9.6 tonnes. At the time, this was the heaviest payload to be launched by a Proton rocket. The automatic docking system was unable to dock the module completely with Mir on the first attempt. On April 5, the crew of EO-2 retreated to their lifeboat, Soyuz TM-2, in case the module lost control.

The module drifted 400 km from the station before it was guided back of a second docking attempt, and on April 9 a partial docking between Kvant and Mir occurred.

To determine the problem with the Kvant docking, both Romanenko and Laveykin took part in an emergency spacewalk on April 11. On the spacewalk they discovered some debris, probably a trash bag, was preventing the spacecraft from fully docking. The spacewalk lasted 3 hours and 40 minutes. With the problem fixed, on April 11 Kvant achieved a complete docking to Mir. The next day the FSM was undocked from Kvant, as it was no longer needed, and it was placed in a parking orbit 41 km above Mir; over a year later it underwent uncontrolled reentry.

=== April to July 1987 ===
The crew first entered the Kvant-1 module on 13 April, when they began unloading equipment. On 23 April the next Progress spacecraft docked with the station via Kvant's rear docking port, where the FSM used to be. Progress 29 had a mass of 7,100 kg, and undocked from the station on 11 May. During this time Mir was short on electricity, so for most of May the EO-2 crew performed activities that used little electricity, such as medical experiments or Earth observations. On 22 May the next resupply craft arrived, Progress 30, which had a mass of 7,249 kg. It remained docked until 19 July.

During June the EO-2 crew performed two spacewalks (EVAs) to install a new set of solar arrays, which would boost the electrical capacity of the station to 11.4 kW.

=== Mir EP-1 ===
The first visitors the EO-2 crew had come in July 1987 aboard the spacecraft Soyuz TM-3. The three person crew launched by TM-3 included the first Syrian astronaut, Muhammed Faris. The crew had originally been scheduled to visit Salyut 7 in 1985, but it was reassigned to Mir. On July 24, the spacecraft automatically docked to the Kvant-1 port, but they had to use a lever to break the hatch's seal. Shortly after the new arrivals floated into the station, it was publicly announced that Aleksandr Aleksandrov would replace Aleksandr Laveykin as one of the EO-2 long term crew members, and Laveykin would return to Earth a week later with the EP-1 crew.

The desire to have favourable daylight conditions during passes over Syria was the primary motivation for the timing of the mission. Several experiments were conducted with Faris on board, and Syria was observed from space.

On July 29, Soyuz TM-2 undocked from the station, and carried Faris, Viktorenko, and Laveykin. Once on the ground, Laveykin was flown to Moscow to be examined by heart specialists. They determined that he was fit to fly after all.

=== August to December 1987 ===
Of the six Progress spacecraft which docked with the station during EO-3, three of them arrived during the second segment:

- Progress 31 - Docked 5 August, undocked 21 September
- Progress 32 - Docked 26 September, undocked 10 November
- Progress 33 - Docked 23 November, undocked 19 December

=== Handover to Mir EO-3 ===
The spacecraft Soyuz TM-4 docked with Mir, via the rear port of Kvant, on 23 December. It brought to the station Vladimir Titov and Musa Manarov of the next long-duration expedition EO-3. Also brought to the station was potential Buran space shuttle pilot, Anatoli Levchenko, who returned to Earth with the EO-2 crew. Levchenko's spaceflight, which lasted for the duration of the EO-2/EO-3 crew handover, is known as Mir LII-1.

== See also ==
- List of Mir Expeditions
