= Progress M-2 =

1989 Soviet uncrewed cargo spacecraft

- Mission type: Mir resupply
- COSPAR ID: 1989-099A
- SATCAT no.: 20373

Spacecraft properties
- Spacecraft type: Progress-M 11F615A55
- Manufacturer: NPO Energia
- Launch mass: 7,250 kilograms (15,980 lb)

Start of mission
- Launch date: 20 December 1989, 03:30:50 UTC
- Rocket: Soyuz-U2
- Launch site: Baikonur Site 1/5

End of mission
- Disposal: Deorbited
- Decay date: 9 February 1990, 07:56 UTC

Orbital parameters
- Reference system: Geocentric
- Regime: Low Earth
- Perigee altitude: 390 kilometres (240 mi)
- Apogee altitude: 393 kilometres (244 mi)
- Inclination: 51.6 degrees

Docking with Mir
- Docking port: Kvant-1 Aft
- Docking date: 22 December 1989, 05:41:21 UTC
- Undocking date: 9 February 1990, 02:33:07 UTC
- Time docked: 48 days

Progress M-2 (Russian: Прогресс М-2), was a Soviet uncrewed cargo spacecraft which was launched in 1989 to resupply the Mir space station. The nineteenth of sixty four Progress spacecraft to visit Mir, it used the Progress-M 11F615A55 configuration, and had the serial number 202. It carried supplies including food, water and oxygen for the EO-5 crew aboard Mir, as well as equipment for conducting scientific research, and fuel for adjusting the station's orbit and performing manoeuvres.

Progress M-2 was launched at 03:30:50 GMT on 20 December 1989, atop a Soyuz-U2 carrier rocket flying from Site 1/5 at the Baikonur Cosmodrome. It docked with the aft port of the Kvant-1 module of Mir at 05:41:21 GMT on 22 December. During the time it was docked, Mir was in an orbit of around 390 by 393 kilometres (211 by 212 nmi). Progress M-2 remained docked with Mir for forty eight days before undocking at 02:33:07 GMT on 9 February 1990 to make way for the Soyuz TM-9 spacecraft, carrying the EO-6 crew to the station.

Progress M-2 was deorbited at 07:07:00 GMT, a few hours after it had undocked. It burned up in the atmosphere over the Pacific Ocean, with any remaining debris landing in the ocean at around 07:56 GMT.

== See also ==
- 1989 in spaceflight
- 1990 in spaceflight
- List of Progress flights
- List of uncrewed spaceflights to Mir
