= 1989 in spaceflight =

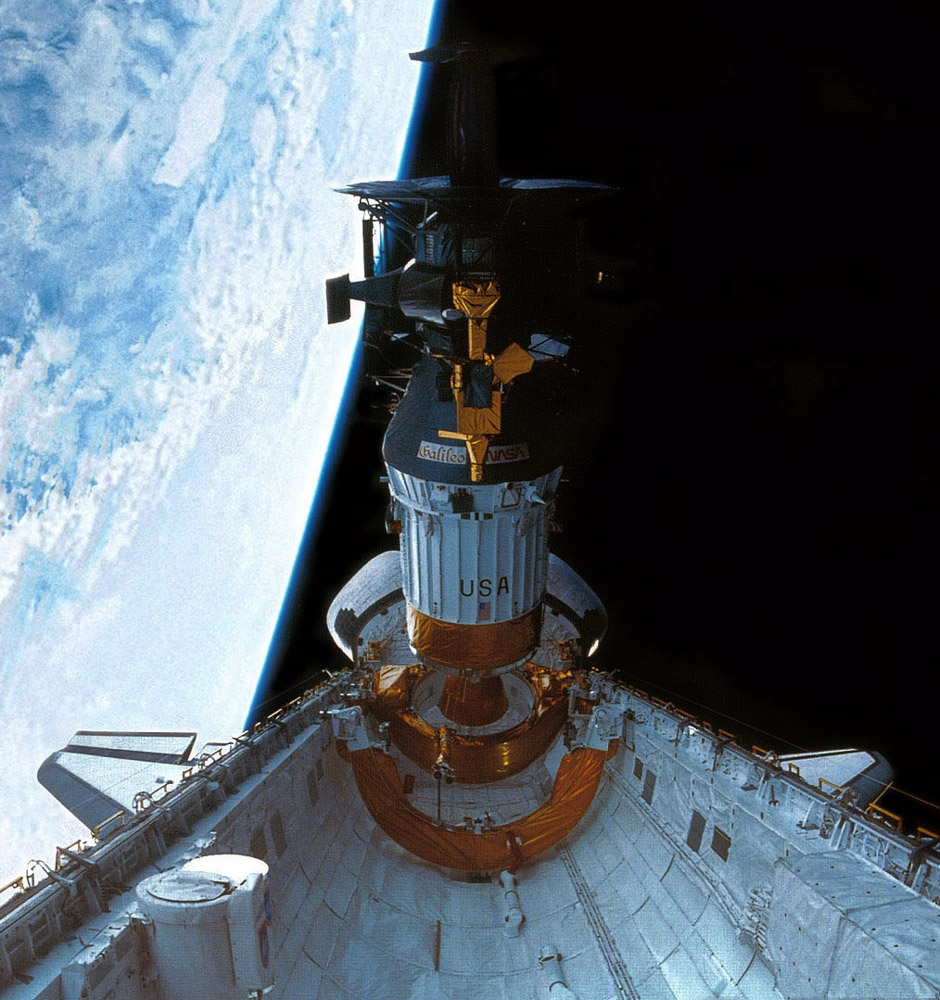
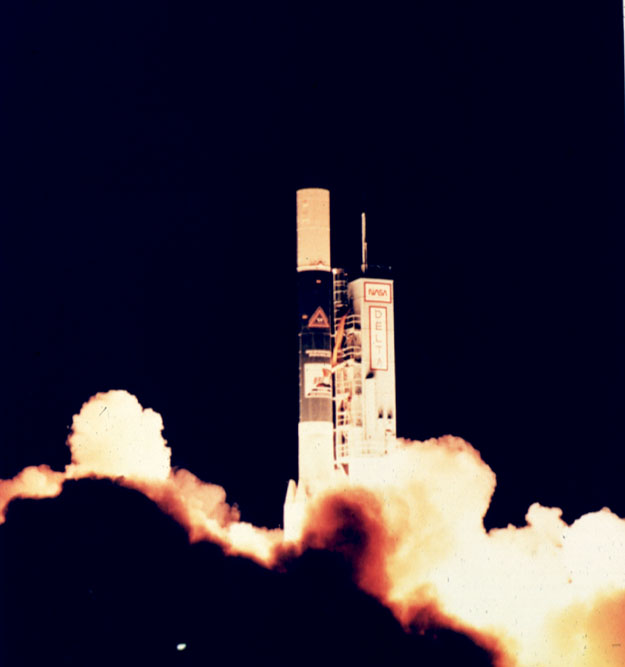
- The Galileo probe is deployed from Space Shuttle Atlantis on STS-34, beginning a fourteen-year mission to Jupiter The launch of the only Delta 5920 with the Cosmic Background Explorer.

Orbital launches
- First: 10 January
- Last: 27 December
- Total: 102
- Successes: 101
- Failures: 1

Rockets
- Maiden flights: Ariane 4 44L; Delta 4925; Delta 5920; Delta II 6925; Titan IVA
- Retirements: Ariane 2 Ariane 3 Atlas G Delta 3920; Delta 5920; Titan 34D

Crewed flights
- Orbital: 6
- Total travellers: 27

1989 in spaceflight

The following is an outline of 1989 in spaceflight.

== Launches ==
- ← Jan
- Feb
- Mar
- Apr
- May
- Jun
- Jul
- Aug
- Sep
- Oct
- Nov
- Dec →

Date and time (UTC)	Rocket	Flight number	Launch site		LSP	
Date and time (UTC)	Payload (⚀ = CubeSat)	Operator	Orbit	Function	Decay (UTC)	Outcome
Date and time (UTC)	Remarks					
=== January ===
10 January; 02:05	(Soviet Union) Proton-K/DM-2		(Soviet Union) Baikonur Site 200/39		(Soviet Union)	
10 January; 02:05	(Soviet Union) Kosmos 1987 (GLONASS)		Medium Earth	Navigation	In orbit	Successful
10 January; 02:05	(Soviet Union) Kosmos 1988 (GLONASS)		Medium Earth	Navigation	In orbit	Successful
10 January; 02:05	(Soviet Union) Kosmos 1989 (Etalon-2)		Medium Earth	Navigation	In orbit	Successful
12 January; 11:29	(Soviet Union) Soyuz-U		(Soviet Union) Plesetsk Site 16/2		(Soviet Union)	
12 January; 11:29	(Soviet Union) Kosmos 1990 (Resurs-F2)		Low Earth	Earth observation	11 February	Successful
18 January; 08:20	(Soviet Union) Soyuz-U		(Soviet Union) Baikonur		(Soviet Union)	
18 January; 08:20	(Soviet Union) Kosmos 1991 (Zenit-8)		Low Earth	Reconnaissance	1 February	Successful
26 January; 09:16	(Soviet Union) Proton-K/DM-2		(Soviet Union) Baikonur Site 200/40		(Soviet Union)	
26 January; 09:16	(Soviet Union) Gorizont 17		Geosynchronous	Communications	In orbit	Successful
26 January; 15:36	(Soviet Union) Kosmos-3M		(Soviet Union) Plesetsk Site 132/2		(Soviet Union)	
26 January; 15:36	(Soviet Union) Kosmos 1992 (Strela-2M)		Low Earth	Communications	In orbit	Successful
27 January; 01:23	(France) Ariane 2		(France) Kourou ELA-1		(France) Arianespace	
27 January; 01:23	(United Nations) Intelsat 515	Intelsat	Geosynchronous	Communications	In orbit	Successful
28 January; 12:30	(Soviet Union) Soyuz-U		(Soviet Union) Baikonur		(Soviet Union)	
28 January; 12:30	(Soviet Union) Kosmos 1993 (Yantar-4K2)		Low Earth	Reconnaissance	27 March	Successful
=== February ===
10 February; 08:53	(Soviet Union) Soyuz-U2		(Soviet Union) Baikonur Site 1/5		(Soviet Union)	
10 February; 08:53	(Soviet Union) Progress 40		Low Earth (Mir)	Logistics	5 March; 01:59	Successful
10 February; 15:13	(Soviet Union) Tsyklon-3		(Soviet Union) Plesetsk Site 32		(Soviet Union)	
10 February; 15:13	(Soviet Union) Kosmos 1994 (Strela-3)		Low Earth	Communications	In orbit	Successful
10 February; 15:13	(Soviet Union) Kosmos 1995 (Strela-3)		Low Earth	Communications	In orbit	Successful
10 February; 15:13	(Soviet Union) Kosmos 1996 (Strela-3)		Low Earth	Communications	In orbit	Successful
10 February; 15:13	(Soviet Union) Kosmos 1997 (Strela-3)		Low Earth	Communications	In orbit	Successful
10 February; 15:13	(Soviet Union) Kosmos 1998 (Strela-3)		Low Earth	Communications	In orbit	Successful
10 February; 15:13	(Soviet Union) Kosmos 1999 (Strela-3)		Low Earth	Communications	In orbit	Successful
10 February; 16:55	(Soviet Union) Soyuz-U		(Soviet Union) Plesetsk		(Soviet Union)	
10 February; 16:55	(Soviet Union) Kosmos 2000 (Zenit-8)		Low Earth	Reconnaissance	3 March	Successful
14 February; 04:21	(Soviet Union) Molniya-M/2BL		(Soviet Union) Plesetsk		(Soviet Union)	
14 February; 04:21	(Soviet Union) Kosmos 2001 (Oko)		Molniya	Early warning	In orbit	Successful
14 February; 17:00	(Soviet Union) Kosmos-3M		(Soviet Union) Plesetsk Site 132/2		(Soviet Union)	
14 February; 17:00	(Soviet Union) Kosmos 2002 (Taifun-2)		Low Earth	Radar calibration	15 October	Successful
14 February; 18:30	(United States) Delta II 6925		(United States) Cape Canaveral LC-17A		(United States) McDonnell Douglas	
14 February; 18:30	(United States) USA-35 (GPS II-1)	US Air Force	Medium Earth	Navigation	In orbit	Successful
14 February; 18:30	Maiden flight of Delta II 6925; First flight of Block II GPS satellite					
15 February; 11:00	(Soviet Union) Molniya-M/ML		(Soviet Union) Baikonur		(Soviet Union)	
15 February; 11:00	(Soviet Union) Molniya 1-75		Molniya	Communications	In orbit	Successful
17 February; 14:59	(Soviet Union) Soyuz-U		(Soviet Union) Plesetsk		(Soviet Union)	
17 February; 14:59	(Soviet Union) Kosmos 2003 (Zenit-8)		Low Earth	Reconnaissance	3 March	Successful
21 February; 23:30	(Japan) Mu-3S-II		(Japan) Uchinoura		(Japan) ISAS	
21 February; 23:30	(Japan) EXOS-D Akebono	ISAS	Low Earth	Aurora observation	In orbit	Successful
22 February; 03:28	(Soviet Union) Kosmos-3M		(Soviet Union) Plesetsk Site 132/2		(Soviet Union)	
22 February; 03:28	(Soviet Union) Kosmos 2004 (Parus)		Low Earth	Navigation	In orbit	Successful
28 February; 04:05	(Soviet Union) Tsyklon-3		(Soviet Union) Plesetsk Site 32		(Soviet Union)	
28 February; 04:05	(Soviet Union) Meteor 2-18		Low Earth	Earth sciences	In orbit	Successful
=== March ===
2 March; 18:59	(Soviet Union) Soyuz-U		(Soviet Union) Plesetsk		(Soviet Union)	
2 March; 18:59	(Soviet Union) Kosmos 2005 (Yantar-4K2)		Low Earth	Reconnaissance	25 April	Successful
6 March; 23:29	(France) Ariane 4 44LP		(France) Kourou ELA-2		(France) Arianespace	
6 March; 23:29	(Japan) JCSAT 1	JSAT	Geosynchronous	Communications	In orbit	Successful
6 March; 23:29	Meteosat 4	EUMETSAT	Geosynchronous	Weather satellite	In orbit	Successful
13 March; 14:57	(United States) Space Shuttle Discovery		(United States) Kennedy LC-39B		(United States)	
13 March; 14:57	(United States) STS-29	NASA	Low Earth	Satellite deployment	18 March; 14:36	Successful
13 March; 14:57	(United States) TDRS-4 (TDRS-D)	NASA	Geosynchronous	Communications	In orbit	Operational
13 March; 14:57	Crewed orbital flight with 5 astronauts					
16 March; 14:59	(Soviet Union) Soyuz-U		(Soviet Union) Plesetsk		(Soviet Union)	
16 March; 14:59	(Soviet Union) Kosmos 2006 (Zenit-8)		Low Earth	Reconnaissance	31 March	Successful
16 March; 18:54	(Soviet Union) Soyuz-U2		(Soviet Union) Baikonur Site 1/5		(Soviet Union)	
16 March; 18:54	(Soviet Union) Progress 41		Low Earth (Mir)	Logistics	25 April; 12:12	Successful
23 March; 12:25	(Soviet Union) Soyuz-U		(Soviet Union) Baikonur		(Soviet Union)	
23 March; 12:25	(Soviet Union) Kosmos 2007 (Yantar-4KS1)		Low Earth	Reconnaissance	22 September	Successful
24 March; 13:38	(Soviet Union) Kosmos-3M		(Soviet Union) Plesetsk Site 132/2		(Soviet Union)	
24 March; 13:38	(Soviet Union) Kosmos 2008 (Strela-1M)		Low Earth	Communications	In orbit	Successful
24 March; 13:38	(Soviet Union) Kosmos 2009 (Strela-1M)		Low Earth	Communications	In orbit	Successful
24 March; 13:38	(Soviet Union) Kosmos 2010 (Strela-1M)		Low Earth	Communications	In orbit	Successful
24 March; 13:38	(Soviet Union) Kosmos 2011 (Strela-1M)		Low Earth	Communications	In orbit	Successful
24 March; 13:38	(Soviet Union) Kosmos 2012 (Strela-1M)		Low Earth	Communications	In orbit	Successful
24 March; 13:38	(Soviet Union) Kosmos 2013 (Strela-1M)		Low Earth	Communications	In orbit	Successful
24 March; 13:38	(Soviet Union) Kosmos 2014 (Strela-1M)		Low Earth	Communications	In orbit	Successful
24 March; 13:38	(Soviet Union) Kosmos 2015 (Strela-1M)		Low Earth	Communications	In orbit	Successful
24 March; 21:50	(United States) Delta 3920		(United States) Cape Canaveral LC-17B		(United States) McDonnell Douglas	
24 March; 21:50	(United States) USA-36 (Delta Star)	US Air Force	Low Earth	Technology development	23 June 1992	Successful
24 March; 21:50	Final flight of Delta 3920					
=== April ===
2 April; 02:28	(France) Ariane 2		(France) Kourou ELA-1		(France) Arianespace	
2 April; 02:28	(Sweden) Tele-X	Nordic Satellite AB	Operational: Geosynchronous; Current: Graveyard	Communications	In orbit	Successful
2 April; 02:28	Final flight of Ariane 2 Tele-X retired 16 January 1998					
4 April; 18:36	(Soviet Union) Kosmos-3M		(Soviet Union) Plesetsk Site 132/2		(Soviet Union)	
4 April; 18:36	(Soviet Union) Kosmos 2016 (Parus)		Low Earth	Navigation	In orbit	Successful
6 April; 14:00	(Soviet Union) Soyuz-U		(Soviet Union) Plesetsk		(Soviet Union)	
6 April; 14:00	(Soviet Union) Kosmos 2017 (Zenit-8)		Low Earth	Reconnaissance	19 April	Successful
14 April; 04:08	(Soviet Union) Proton-K/DM-2		(Soviet Union) Baikonur Site 200/39		(Soviet Union)	
14 April; 04:08	(Soviet Union) Raduga 23		Geosynchronous	Communications	In orbit	Successful
20 April; 18:29	(Soviet Union) Soyuz-U		(Soviet Union) Plesetsk		(Soviet Union)	
20 April; 18:29	(Soviet Union) Kosmos 2018 (Yantar-4K2)		Low Earth	Reconnaissance	19 June	Successful
26 April; 17:00	(Soviet Union) Soyuz-U		(Soviet Union) Plesetsk Site 41/1		(Soviet Union)	
26 April; 17:00	(Soviet Union) Foton 5		Low Earth	Microgravity research	11 May	Successful
=== May ===
4 May; 18:47	(United States) Space Shuttle Atlantis		(United States) Kennedy LC-39B		(United States)	
4 May; 18:47	(United States) STS-30	NASA	Low Earth	Interplanetary probe deployment	8 May; 05:43	Successful
4 May; 18:47	(United States) Magellan	NASA	Cytherean	Radar mapping	12 October 1994	Successful
4 May; 18:47	Crewed orbital flight with 5 astronauts					
5 May; 13:00	(Soviet Union) Soyuz-U		(Soviet Union) Plesetsk		(Soviet Union)	
5 May; 13:00	(Soviet Union) Kosmos 2019 (Zenit-8)		Low Earth	Reconnaissance	18 May	Successful
10 May; 19:47	(United States) Titan 34D/Transtage		(United States) Cape Canaveral LC-40		(United States) Martin Marietta	
10 May; 19:47	(United States) USA-37 (Vortex 6)	NRO	Geosynchronous	SIGINT	In orbit	Successful
17 May; 13:00	(Soviet Union) Soyuz-U		(Soviet Union) Baikonur		(Soviet Union)	
17 May; 13:00	(Soviet Union) Kosmos 2020 (Yantar-4K2)		Low Earth	Reconnaissance	15 July	Successful
24 May; 10:30	(Soviet Union) Soyuz-U		(Soviet Union) Baikonur		(Soviet Union)	
24 May; 10:30	(Soviet Union) Kosmos 2021 (Yantar-1KFT)		Low Earth	Reconnaissance	6 July	Successful
25 May; 08:50	(Soviet Union) Soyuz-U		(Soviet Union) Plesetsk Site 43/3		(Soviet Union)	
25 May; 08:50	(Soviet Union) Resurs-F1		Low Earth	Earth observation	17 June	Successful
25 May; 08:50	(Soviet Union) Pion 1		Low Earth	Atmospheric research	23 July	Successful
25 May; 08:50	(Soviet Union) Pion 2		Low Earth	Atmospheric research	24 July	Successful
31 May; 08:31	(Soviet Union) Proton-K/DM-2		(Soviet Union) Baikonur Site 200/40		(Soviet Union)	
31 May; 08:31	(Soviet Union) Kosmos 2022 (GLONASS)		Medium Earth	Navigation	In orbit	Successful
31 May; 08:31	(Soviet Union) Kosmos 2023 (GLONASS)		Medium Earth	Navigation	In orbit	Successful
31 May; 08:31	(Soviet Union) Kosmos 2024 (Etalon 2)		Medium Earth	Navigation	In orbit	Successful
=== June ===
1 June; 12:59	(Soviet Union) Soyuz-U		(Soviet Union) Plesetsk		(Soviet Union)	
1 June; 12:59	(Soviet Union) Kosmos 2025 (Zenit-8)		Low Earth	Reconnaissance	15 June	Successful
5 June; 22:37	(France) Ariane 4 44L		(France) Kourou ELA-2		(France) Arianespace	
5 June; 22:37	(Japan) Superbird A	SCC	Geosynchronous	Communications	In orbit	Successful
5 June; 22:37	(Germany) DFS-1	Deutsche Bundespost Telekom	Geosynchronous	Communications	In orbit	Successful
5 June; 22:37	Maiden flight of Ariane 4 44L					
7 June; 05:12	(Soviet Union) Kosmos-3M		(Soviet Union) Plesetsk Site 132/2		(Soviet Union)	
7 June; 05:12	(Soviet Union) Kosmos 2026 (Parus)		Low Earth	Navigation	In orbit	Successful
8 June; 17:09	(Soviet Union) Molniya-M/ML		(Soviet Union) Plesetsk		(Soviet Union)	
8 June; 17:09	(Soviet Union) Molniya 3-45L		Molniya	Communications	14 December 2001	Successful
9 June; 10:10	(Soviet Union) Tsyklon-3		(Soviet Union) Plesetsk Site 32/2		(Soviet Union)	
9 June; 10:10	(Soviet Union) Okean-O1 4		Intended: Low Earth	Oceanography	9 June	Launch failure
9 June; 10:10	Failure of the third stage					
10 June; 22:19	(United States) Delta II 6925		(United States) Cape Canaveral LC-17A		(United States) McDonnell Douglas	
10 June; 22:19	(United States) USA-38 (GPS II-2)	US Air Force	Medium Earth	Navigation	In orbit	Successful
14 June; 12:30	(Soviet Union) Kosmos-3M		(Soviet Union) Plesetsk Site 133/3		(Soviet Union)	
14 June; 12:30	(Soviet Union) Kosmos 2027 (Taifun-1)		Low Earth	Radar calibration	14 April 1992	Successful
14 June; 13:18	(United States) Titan IVA 402/IUS		(United States) Cape Canaveral LC-41		(United States) Martin Marietta	
14 June; 13:18	(United States) USA-39 (DSP-14)	US Air Force	Geosynchronous	Early warning	In orbit	Operational
14 June; 13:18	Maiden flight of Titan IVA					
16 June; 09:30	(Soviet Union) Soyuz-U		(Soviet Union) Baikonur		(Soviet Union)	
16 June; 09:30	(Soviet Union) Kosmos 2028 (Zenit-8)		Low Earth	Reconnaissance	6 July	Successful
21 June; 23:35	(Soviet Union) Proton-K/DM-2		(Soviet Union) Baikonur Site 200/39		(Soviet Union)	
21 June; 23:35	(Soviet Union) Raduga 1-1		Geosynchronous	Communications	In orbit	Successful
27 June; 08:04	(Soviet Union) Soyuz-U		(Soviet Union) Plesetsk Site 16/2		(Soviet Union)	
27 June; 08:04	(Soviet Union) Resurs-F2		Low Earth	Earth observation	11 July	Successful
=== July ===
4 July; 15:21	(Soviet Union) Kosmos-3M		(Soviet Union) Plesetsk Site 133/3		(Soviet Union)	
4 July; 15:21	(Soviet Union) Nadezhda 1	COSPAS-SARSAT	Low Earth	Navigation, search and rescue	In orbit	Successful
5 July; 08:00	(Soviet Union) Soyuz-U		(Soviet Union) Plesetsk		(Soviet Union)	
5 July; 08:00	(Soviet Union) Kosmos 2029 (Zenit-8)		Low Earth	Reconnaissance	17 July	Successful
5 July; 22:45	(Soviet Union) Proton-K/DM-2		(Soviet Union) Baikonur Site 200/40		(Soviet Union)	
5 July; 22:45	(Soviet Union) Gorizont 18		Geosynchronous	Communications	In orbit	Successful
12 July; 00:14	(France) Ariane 3		(France) Kourou ELA-1		(France) Arianespace	
12 July; 00:14	Olympus 1	ESA	Geosynchronous	Communications	In orbit	Successful
12 July; 00:14	Final flight of Ariane 3 and launch from ELA-1					
12 July; 15:00	(Soviet Union) Soyuz-U		(Soviet Union) Plesetsk		(Soviet Union)	
12 July; 15:00	(Soviet Union) Kosmos 2030 (Yantar-4K2)		Low Earth	Reconnaissance	28 July	Spacecraft failure
12 July; 15:00	Spacecraft exploded in orbit on 28 July					
18 July; 09:44	(Soviet Union) Soyuz-U		(Soviet Union) Plesetsk Site 16/2		(Soviet Union)	
18 July; 09:44	(Soviet Union) Resurs-F 3		Low Earth	Earth observation	8 August	Successful
18 July; 09:44	(Soviet Union) Pion 3		Low Earth	Atmospheric research	19 September	Successful
18 July; 09:44	(Soviet Union) Pion 4		Low Earth	Atmospheric research	19 September	Successful
18 July; 12:10	(Soviet Union) Soyuz-U2		(Soviet Union) Baikonur Site 1/5		(Soviet Union)	
18 July; 12:10	(Soviet Union) Kosmos 2031 (Orlets-1)		Low Earth	Reconnaissance	15 September	Successful
20 July; 08:59	(Soviet Union) Soyuz-U		(Soviet Union) Plesetsk		(Soviet Union)	
20 July; 08:59	(Soviet Union) Kosmos 2032 (Zenit-8)		Low Earth	Reconnaissance	3 August	Successful
24 July; 00:00	(Soviet Union) Tsyklon-2		(Soviet Union) Baikonur Site 90		(Soviet Union)	
24 July; 00:00	(Soviet Union) Kosmos 2033 (US-P)		Low Earth	ELINT	6 January 1991	Successful
25 July; 07:48	(Soviet Union) Kosmos-3M		(Soviet Union) Plesetsk Site 133/3		(Soviet Union)	
25 July; 07:48	(Soviet Union) Kosmos 2034 (Parus)		Low Earth	Navigation	In orbit	Successful
=== August ===
2 August; 11:29	(Soviet Union) Soyuz-U		(Soviet Union) Plesetsk		(Soviet Union)	
2 August; 11:29	(Soviet Union) Kosmos 2035 (Zenit-8)		Low Earth	Reconnaissance	16 August	Successful
8 August; 12:37	(United States) Space Shuttle Columbia		(United States) Kennedy LC-39B		(United States)	
8 August; 12:37	(United States) STS-28	NASA	Low Earth	Satellite deployment	13 August	Successful
8 August; 12:37	(United States) USA-40 (SDS-2-1)	US Air Force	Molniya	Communications	In orbit	Successful
8 August; 12:37	(United States) USA-41	DoD		SIGINT	In orbit	Successful
8 August; 12:37	Crewed orbital flight with 5 astronauts					
8 August; 23:25	(France) Ariane 4 44LP		(France) Kourou ELA-2		(France) Arianespace	
8 August; 23:25	(Germany) TV-Sat 2		Geosynchronous	Communications	In orbit	Successful
8 August; 23:25	Hipparcos	ESA	Geosynchronous transfer	Astronomy	In orbit	Successful
15 August; 10:29	(Soviet Union) Soyuz-U		(Soviet Union) Plesetsk Site 43/4		(Soviet Union)	
15 August; 10:29	(Soviet Union) Resurs-F4		Low Earth	Earth observation	14 September	Successful
18 August; 05:57	(United States) Delta II 6925		(United States) Cape Canaveral LC-17A		(United States) McDonnell Douglas	
18 August; 05:57	(United States) USA-42 (GPS II-3)	US Air Force	Medium Earth	Navigation	In orbit	Successful
22 August; 12:59	(Soviet Union) Soyuz-U		(Soviet Union) Plesetsk		(Soviet Union)	
22 August; 12:59	(Soviet Union) Kosmos 2036 (Zenit-8)		Low Earth	Reconnaissance	5 September	Successful
23 August; 03:09	(Soviet Union) Soyuz-U2		(Soviet Union) Baikonur Site 1/5		(Soviet Union)	
23 August; 03:09	(Soviet Union) Progress M-1		Low Earth (Mir)	Logistics	1 December; 11:21	Successful
23 August; 03:09	Maiden flight of Progress-M spacecraft					
27 August; 22:59	(United States) Delta 4925		(United States) Cape Canaveral LC-17B		(United States) McDonnell Douglas	
27 August; 22:59	(United Kingdom) Marco Polo 1	BSkyB	Operational: Geosynchronous; Current: Graveyard	Communications	In orbit	Successful
27 August; 22:59	Maiden flight of Delta 4925					
28 August; 00:14	(Soviet Union) Tsyklon-3		(Soviet Union) Plesetsk Site 32/2		(Soviet Union)	
28 August; 00:14	(Soviet Union) Kosmos 2037 (Geo-IK)		Low Earth	Earth science	In orbit	Successful
=== September ===
4 September; 05:54	(United States) Titan 34D/Transtage		(United States) Cape Canaveral LC-40		(United States) Martin Marietta	
4 September; 05:54	(United States) USA-43 (DSCS-II)	DoD	Geosynchronous	Communications	In orbit	Operational
4 September; 05:54	(United States) USA-44 (DSCS-III)	DoD	Geosynchronous	Communications	In orbit	Operational
4 September; 05:54	Final flight of Titan 34D and Transtage upper stage					
5 September; 19:11	(Japan) H-I		(Japan) Tanegashima LA-N		(Japan) Mitsubishi	
5 September; 19:11	(Japan) GMS-4	NASDA	Geosynchronous	Weather satellite	In orbit	Successful
5 September; 21:38	(Soviet Union) Soyuz-U2		(Soviet Union) Baikonur Site 1/5		(Soviet Union)	
5 September; 21:38	(Soviet Union) Soyuz TM-8		Low Earth (Mir)	Mir EO-5	19 February 1990; 04:36	Successful
5 September; 21:38	Crewed orbital flight with 2 cosmonauts					
6 September; 01:48	(United States) Titan II 23G		(United States) Vandenberg SLC-4W		(United States) Martin Marietta	
6 September; 01:48	(United States) USA-45	DoD		SIGINT	In orbit	Successful
6 September; 10:49	(Soviet Union) Soyuz-U		(Soviet Union) Plesetsk Site 43/3		(Soviet Union)	
6 September; 10:49	(Soviet Union) / (Germany) Resurs-F5		Low Earth	Microgravity experiments	22 September	Successful
14 September; 09:49	(Soviet Union) Tsyklon-3		(Soviet Union) Plesetsk Site 32		(Soviet Union)	
14 September; 09:49	(Soviet Union) Kosmos 2038 (Strela-3)		Low Earth	Communications	In orbit	Successful
14 September; 09:49	(Soviet Union) Kosmos 2039 (Strela-3)		Low Earth	Communications	In orbit	Successful
14 September; 09:49	(Soviet Union) Kosmos 2040 (Strela-3)		Low Earth	Communications	In orbit	Successful
14 September; 09:49	(Soviet Union) Kosmos 2041 (Strela-3)		Low Earth	Communications	In orbit	Successful
14 September; 09:49	(Soviet Union) Kosmos 2042 (Strela-3)		Low Earth	Communications	In orbit	Successful
14 September; 09:49	(Soviet Union) Kosmos 2043 (Strela-3)		Low Earth	Communications	In orbit	Successful
15 September; 06:30	(Soviet Union) Soyuz-U		(Soviet Union) Plesetsk		(Soviet Union)	
15 September; 06:30	(Soviet Union) // (United States) Kosmos 2044 (Bion 9)	ESA/NASA	Low Earth	Microgravity research	29 September	Successful
22 September; 08:00	(Soviet Union) Soyuz-U		(Soviet Union) Baikonur		(Soviet Union)	
22 September; 08:00	(Soviet Union) Kosmos 2045 (Zenit-8)		Low Earth	Reconnaissance	2 October	Successful
25 September; 08:56	(United States) Atlas G		(United States) Cape Canaveral LC-36B		(United States) Lockheed	
25 September; 08:56	(United States) USA-46 (FLTSATCOM 8)	DoD	Geosynchronous	Communications	In orbit	Successful
25 September; 08:56	Final flight of Atlas G					
27 September; 14:38	(Soviet Union) Molniya-M/ML		(Soviet Union) Plesetsk		(Soviet Union)	
27 September; 14:38	(Soviet Union) Molniya 1-76		Molniya	Communications	11 November 2000	Successful
27 September; 16:20	(Soviet Union) Tsyklon-2		(Soviet Union) Baikonur Site 90		(Soviet Union)	
27 September; 16:20	(Soviet Union) Kosmos 2046 (US-P)		Low Earth	Naval reconnaissance	16 April 1991	Successful
28 September; 00:04	(Soviet Union) Tsyklon-3		(Soviet Union) Plesetsk Site 32/2		(Soviet Union)	
28 September; 00:04	(United Nations) Intercosmos 24 (Aktivny-IK/AUOS-Z-AV-IK 1)	Intercosmos	Low Earth	Atmospheric research	In orbit	Successful
28 September; 00:04	(Czechoslovakia) Magion 2		Low Earth	Atmospheric research	In orbit	Successful
28 September; 17:05	(Soviet Union) Proton-K/DM-2		(Soviet Union) Baikonur Site 200/40		(Soviet Union)	
28 September; 17:05	(Soviet Union) Gorizont 19		Geosynchronous	Communications	In orbit	Successful
=== October ===
3 October; 14:59	(Soviet Union) Soyuz-U		(Soviet Union) Plesetsk		(Soviet Union)	
3 October; 14:59	(Soviet Union) Kosmos 2047 (Yantar-4K2)		Low Earth	Reconnaissance	21 November	Successful
17 October; 13:00	(Soviet Union) Soyuz-U		(Soviet Union) Plesetsk		(Soviet Union)	
17 October; 13:00	(Soviet Union) Kosmos 2048 (Zenit-8)		Low Earth	Reconnaissance	26 October	Successful
18 October; 16:53	(United States) Space Shuttle Atlantis		(United States) Kennedy LC-39B		(United States)	
18 October; 16:53	(United States) STS-34	NASA	Low Earth	Interplanetary probe deployment	23 October	Successful
18 October; 16:53	(United States) Galileo	NASA	Jovian	Jupiter orbiter	21 September 2003	Successful
18 October; 16:53	(United States) Galileo Probe	NASA	Jovian	Jupiter entry probe	7 December 1995	Successful
18 October; 16:53	Crewed orbital flight with 5 astronauts					
21 October; 09:31	(United States) Delta II 6925		(United States) Cape Canaveral LC-17A		(United States) McDonnell Douglas	
21 October; 09:31	(United States) USA-47 (GPS II-4)	US Air Force	Medium Earth	Navigation	In orbit	Successful
24 October; 21:35	(Soviet Union) Tsyklon-3		(Soviet Union) Plesetsk Site 32		(Soviet Union)	
24 October; 21:35	(Soviet Union) Meteor 3-3		Low Earth	Earth science	In orbit	Successful
27 October; 23:05	(France) Ariane 4 44L		(France) Kourou ELA-2		(France) Arianespace	
27 October; 23:05	(United Nations) Intelsat 602	Intelsat	Geosynchronous	Communications	In orbit	Successful
=== November ===
17 November; 10:50	(Soviet Union) Soyuz-U		(Soviet Union) Baikonur		(Soviet Union)	
17 November; 10:50	(Soviet Union) Kosmos 2049 (Yantar-4KS1)		Low Earth	Reconnaissance	19 June 1990	Successful
18 November; 14:34	(United States) Delta 5920		(United States) Vandenberg SLC-2W		(United States) McDonnell Douglas	
18 November; 14:34	(United States) COBE	NASA	Sun-synchronous	Cosmology	In orbit	Successful
18 November; 14:34	Only flight of Delta 5920					
23 November; 00:23	(United States) Space Shuttle Discovery		(United States) Kennedy LC-39B		(United States)	
23 November; 00:23	(United States) STS-33	NASA	Low Earth	Satellite deployment	28 November	Successful
23 November; 00:23	(United States) USA-48 (Magnum-2)	NRO	Geosynchronous	ELINT	In orbit	Operational
23 November; 00:23	Crewed orbital flight with 5 astronauts					
23 November; 20:35	(Soviet Union) Molniya-M/2BL		(Soviet Union) Plesetsk		(Soviet Union)	
23 November; 20:35	(Soviet Union) Kosmos 2050 (Oko)		Molniya	Early warning	In orbit	Successful
24 November; 23:22	(Soviet Union) Tsyklon-2		(Soviet Union) Baikonur Site 90		(Soviet Union)	
24 November; 23:22	(Soviet Union) Kosmos 2051 (US-P)		Low Earth	Naval reconnaissance	21 January 1991	Successful
26 November; 13:01	(Soviet Union) Proton-K		(Soviet Union) Baikonur Site 200/39		(Soviet Union)	
26 November; 13:01	(Soviet Union) Kvant-2		Low Earth (Mir)	Mir component	23 March 2001; 05:50	Successful
28 November; 10:02	(Soviet Union) Molniya-M/ML		(Soviet Union) Plesetsk		(Soviet Union)	
28 November; 10:02	(Soviet Union) Molniya 3-46L		Molniya	Communications	20 May 2000	Successful
30 November; 15:00	(Soviet Union) Soyuz-U		(Soviet Union) Plesetsk		(Soviet Union)	
30 November; 15:00	(Soviet Union) Kosmos 2052 (Yantar-4K2)		Low Earth	Reconnaissance	24 January 1990	Successful
=== December ===
1 December; 20:20	(Soviet Union) Proton-K/D-1		(Soviet Union) Baikonur Site 200/40		(Soviet Union)	
1 December; 20:20	(Soviet Union) / (France) Granat	AN SSSR/CNES	High Earth	Astronomy	25 May 1999	Successful
11 December; 18:10	(United States) Delta II 6925		(United States) Cape Canaveral LC-17B		(United States) McDonnell Douglas	
11 December; 18:10	(United States) USA-49 (GPS II-5)	US Air Force	Medium Earth	Navigation	In orbit	Successful
15 December; 11:30	(Soviet Union) Proton-K/DM-2		(Soviet Union) Baikonur Site 81/23		(Soviet Union)	
15 December; 11:30	(Soviet Union) Raduga 24		Geosynchronous	Communications	In orbit	Successful
20 December; 03:30	(Soviet Union) Soyuz-U2		(Soviet Union) Baikonur Site 1/5		(Soviet Union)	
20 December; 03:30	(Soviet Union) Progress M-2		Low Earth (Mir)	Logistics	9 February 1990; 07:56	Successful
27 December; 00:00	(Soviet Union) Tsyklon-3		(Soviet Union) Plesetsk Site 32/2		(Soviet Union)	
27 December; 00:00	(Soviet Union) Kosmos 2053 (Koltso 2)		Low Earth	Radar calibration	2 September 1997	Successful
27 December; 11:10	(Soviet Union) Proton-K/DM-2		(Soviet Union) Baikonur Site 200/39		(Soviet Union)	
27 December; 11:10	(Soviet Union) Kosmos 2054 (Luch)		Geosynchronous	Communications	In orbit	Operational

- ← Jan
- Feb
- Mar
- Apr
- May
- Jun
- Jul
- Aug
- Sep
- Oct
- Nov
- Dec →

== Deep-space rendezvous ==
Date (GMT)	Spacecraft	Event	Remarks
23 January	Phobos 1	Flyby of Mars	Failed orbiter mission
29 January	Phobos 2	Areocentric orbit injection	
27 March	Phobos 2	Enters synchronous orbit of Phobos	
25 August	Voyager 2	Flyby of Neptune	Closest approach: 44,800 kilometres (27,800 mi)
