= Mir EO-5 =

Fifth expedition to Mir space station

- Mission type: Mir expedition
- Mission duration: 166 days, 6 hours, 58 minutes (launch to landing)
- Orbits completed: 2,631

Expedition
- Space station: Mir
- Began: 7 September 1989, 22:25:26 UTC
- Ended: 19 February 1990, 01:06:20 UTC
- Arrived aboard: Soyuz TM-8
- Departed aboard: Soyuz TM-8

Crew
- Crew size: Two
- Members: Alexander Viktorenko; Aleksandr Serebrov

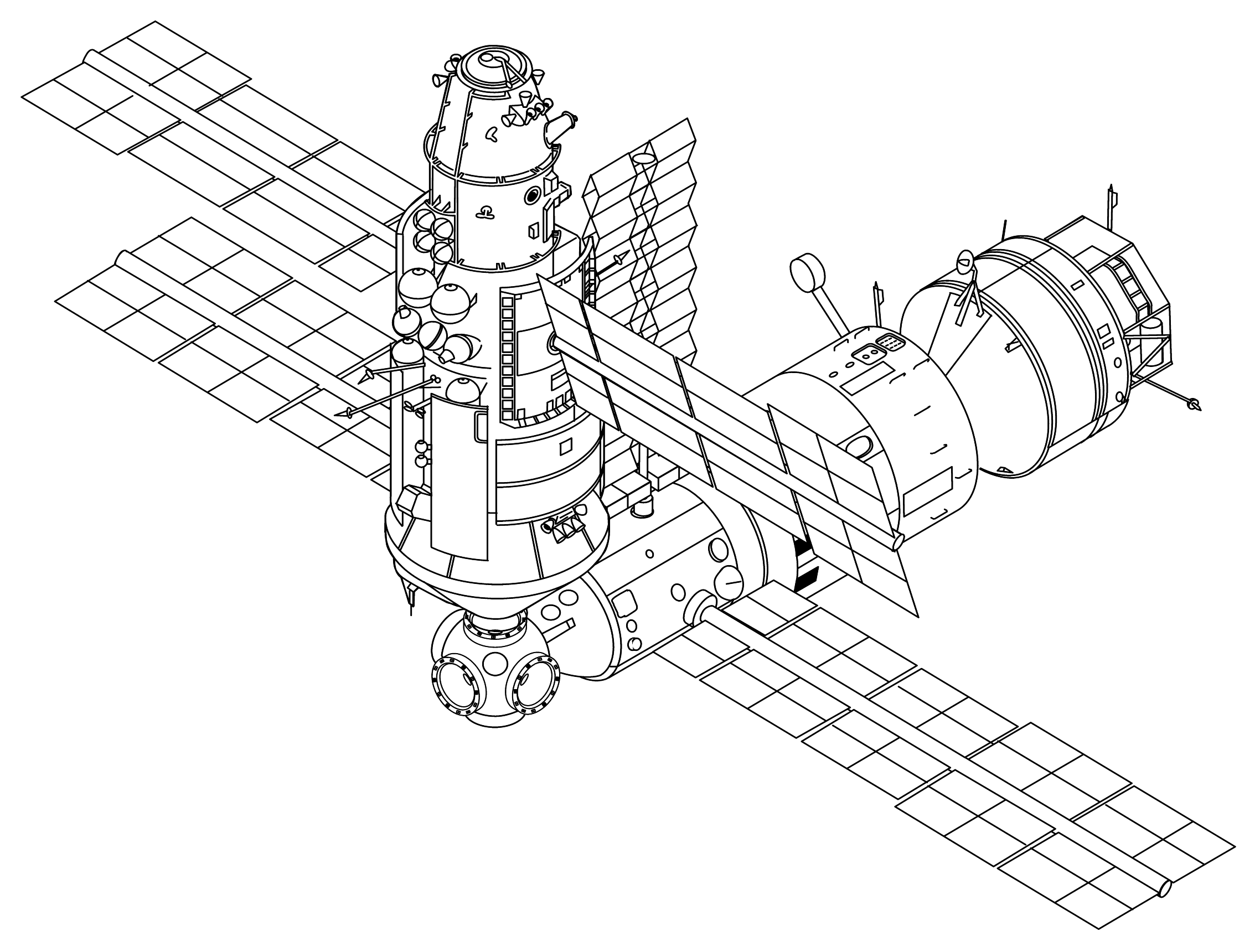
MIR configuration in 1989

Mir EO-5 was the 5th long duration expedition to the space station Mir, which lasted from September 1989 to February 1990. The two person crew was launched and landed in the spacecraft Soyuz TM-8, which remained docked to Mir throughout the mission. The crew are often referred to as the Soyuz TM-8 crew.

== Crew ==
The crew consisted of two Soviet cosmonauts. They had both been in space, but only Viktorenko had previously been to Mir, which was a 7-day visit during Mir EP-1.

Mir EO-5	Name	Spaceflight	Launch	Landing	Duration
Commander	(Soviet Union) Alexander Viktorenko	Second	5 September 1989; Soyuz TM-8	19 February 1990; Soyuz TM-8	166 days
Flight Engineer	(Soviet Union) Aleksandr Serebrov	Third	5 September 1989; Soyuz TM-8	19 February 1990; Soyuz TM-8	166 days

The backup crew for the mission were Anatoly Solovyev (Commander) and Aleksandr Balandin (Flight Engineer), who ended up being the crew of the following expedition, EO-6.

== Background ==
The EO-5 mission was originally scheduled to launch in April 1989. However, in March 1989, the Soyuz spacecraft that was intended to be utilized for the mission was seriously damaged during testing in a vacuum chamber. As a result, the crew of Mir EO-4, which was then in orbit, landed in April as planned, and left Mir unmanned until the arrival of EO-5 in September of the same year.

== Mission Highlights ==
=== Launch and arrival ===
Both crew members arrived via the spacecraft Soyuz TM-8, which launched on 5 September 1989. The crew had to perform a manual docking to the space station as the Kurs rendezvous and docking system malfunctioned.

=== Spacewalks ===
During their stay on Mir, the crew members performed 5 EVAs. These took place on 8 January 1990 (2h 56m) to mount two star sensors for navigation on the Kvant-module, 11 January (2h 54m) to attach tools and remove a space exposure experiment rack, 26 January (3h 2m) using the new Orlan-DMA spacesuits. The cosmonauts attached a mooring post to the outside of the airlock compartment and removed a Kurs antenna so it could not interfere with future EVAs. The fourth EVA took place on 1 February (4h 59m) to test 'Ikar', a maneuvering unit. The final EVA was on 5 February (3h 45m).

=== Science activities ===
While on Mir, the crew took part in experiments in the fields of medicine, geophysics, space technology, earth observation, astronomy and materials sciences.

=== Soyuz TM-9 and landing ===
On 13 February, Soyuz TM-9 arrived at the station carried the next long duration crew members, EO-6. Docking was uneventful, but prior to docking the EO-6 crew had noticed that some thermal insulation blankets on the Soyuz TM-9 descent module were loose. Procedures were developed to ensure the spacecraft maintained an appropriate temperature, and once ground control considered the situation manageable, the EO-5 crew returned to Earth.

The expedition officially ended on 19 February 1990 as the 2 crew members returned on Soyuz TM-8. Landing occurred a few hours after undocking, 55 km northeast of Arkalyk. During their stay upon Mir, the crew completed 2631 orbits of Earth, and the mission in total lasted 166d 06h 58m from launch to landing.
