= Progress M-1 =

1989 Soviet spacecraft

- Mission type: Mir resupply
- Operator: OKB-1
- COSPAR ID: 1989-066A
- SATCAT no.: 20191
- Mission duration: 100 days, 8 hours and 12 minutes

Spacecraft properties
- Spacecraft: Progress s/n 201
- Spacecraft type: Progress-M 11F615A55
- Manufacturer: NPO Energia
- Launch mass: 7270 kg

Start of mission
- Launch date: 23 August 1989, 03:09:32 UTC
- Rocket: Soyuz-U2 s/n T15000-037
- Launch site: Baikonur, Site 1/5
- Contractor: OKB-1

End of mission
- Disposal: Deorbited
- Decay date: 1 December 1989, 11:21 UTC

Orbital parameters
- Reference system: Geocentric
- Regime: Low Earth
- Perigee altitude: 187 km
- Apogee altitude: 217 km
- Inclination: 51.6°
- Period: 88.5 minutes

Docking with Mir
- Docking port: Mir Core Module forward
- Docking date: 25 August 1989, 05:19:02 UTC
- Undocking date: 1 December 1989, 09:02:23 UTC
- Time docked: 98 days, 3 hours and 43 minutes

Cargo
- Mass: 2500 kg

Progress M-1 (Russian: Прогресс М-1), was a Soviet uncrewed cargo spacecraft which was launched in 1989 to resupply the Mir space station. The eighteenth of sixty four Progress spacecraft to visit Mir, it was the first Progress-M spacecraft to be launched, and had the serial number 201. It carried supplies including food, water and oxygen for the Mir EO-5 crew aboard Mir, as well as equipment for conducting scientific research, and fuel for adjusting the station's orbit and performing manoeuvres. At the time of docking, Mir was uncrewed, and remained so until the arrival of the Mir EO-5 crew two weeks later.

== Launch ==
Progress M-1 was launched at 03:09:32 UTC on 23 August 1989, atop a Soyuz-U2 carrier rocket flying from Site 1/5 at the Baikonur Cosmodrome. It docked with the forward port of Mir Core Module at 05:19:02 UTC on 25 August 1989. During the time it was docked, Mir was in an orbit of around 376 by 393 kilometres (234 by 244 mi). Progress M-1 remained docked with Mir for three months before undocking at 09:02:23 UTC on 1 December 1989 to make way for the Kvant-2 module.

== Decay ==
Progress M-1 was deorbited at 10:32:00 UTC, a few hours after it had undocked. It burned up in the atmosphere over the Pacific Ocean, with remaining debris landing in the ocean at around 11:21 UTC.

== See also ==
- 1989 in spaceflight
- List of Progress flights
- List of uncrewed spaceflights to Mir
