= Progress 40 =

Soviet uncrewed Progress cargo spacecraft

- A Progress 7K-TG spacecraft
- Mission type: Mir resupply
- COSPAR ID: 1989-008A
- SATCAT no.: 19783

Spacecraft properties
- Spacecraft: Progress (No.148)
- Spacecraft type: Progress 7K-TG
- Manufacturer: NPO Energia

Start of mission
- Launch date: 10 February 1989, 08:53:52 UTC
- Rocket: Soyuz-U2
- Launch site: Baikonur, Site 1/5

End of mission
- Disposal: Deorbited
- Decay date: 5 March 1989, 01:08 UTC

Orbital parameters
- Reference system: Geocentric
- Regime: Low Earth
- Perigee altitude: 187 km
- Apogee altitude: 244 km
- Inclination: 51.6°
- Period: 88.8 minutes
- Epoch: 10 February 1989

Docking with Mir
- Docking port: Kvant-1 aft
- Docking date: 12 February 1989, 10:29:38 UTC
- Undocking date: 3 March 1989, 01:45:52 UTC

Progress 40 (Russian: Прогресс 40) was a Soviet unmanned Progress cargo spacecraft, which was launched in February 1989 to resupply the Mir EO-4 expedition aboard the Mir space station.

== Launch ==
Progress 40 launched on 10 February 1989 from the Baikonur Cosmodrome in the Kazakh SSR. It used a Soyuz-U2 rocket.

== Docking ==
Progress 40 docked with the aft port of the Kvant-1 module of Mir on 12 February 1989 at 10:29:38 UTC, and was undocked on 3 March 1989 at 01:45:52 UTC.

== Decay ==
It remained in orbit until 5 March 1989, when it was deorbited. The deorbit burn occurred at 01:08 UTC and the mission ended at 01:59 UTC.

== See also ==
- 1989 in spaceflight
- List of Progress missions
- List of uncrewed spaceflights to Mir
