= Kosmos 2001 =

Soviet military early warning satellite

- Mission type: Early warning
- COSPAR ID: 1989-011A
- SATCAT no.: 19796
- Mission duration: 4 years

Spacecraft properties
- Spacecraft type: US-K
- Launch mass: 1,900 kilograms (4,200 lb)

Start of mission
- Launch date: 14 February 1989, 04:21 UTC
- Rocket: Molniya-M/2BL
- Launch site: Plesetsk Cosmodrome

End of mission
- Decay date: 22 September 2008

Orbital parameters
- Reference system: Geocentric
- Regime: Molniya
- Perigee altitude: 610 kilometres (380 mi)
- Apogee altitude: 39,751 kilometres (24,700 mi)
- Inclination: 63.0 degrees
- Period: 717.92 minutes

Kosmos 2001 (Russian: Космос 2001 meaning Cosmos 2001) is a Soviet US-K missile early warning satellite which was launched in 1989 as part of the Soviet military's Oko programme. The satellite is designed to identify missile launches using optical telescopes and infrared sensors.

Kosmos 2001 was launched from Site 43/3 at Plesetsk Cosmodrome in the Russian SSR. A Molniya-M carrier rocket with a 2BL upper stage was used to perform the launch, which took place at 04:21 UTC on 14 February 1989. The launch successfully placed the satellite into a molniya orbit. It subsequently received its Kosmos designation, and the international designator 1989-011A. The United States Space Command assigned it the Satellite Catalog Number 19796.

It re-entered the Earth's atmosphere on 22 September 2008.

== See also ==
- List of Kosmos satellites (2001–2250)
- List of R-7 launches (1985–1989)
- 1989 in spaceflight
- List of Oko satellites
