= Michael J. McCulley =

American astronaut, aviator and engineer (born 1943)

Mike McCulley
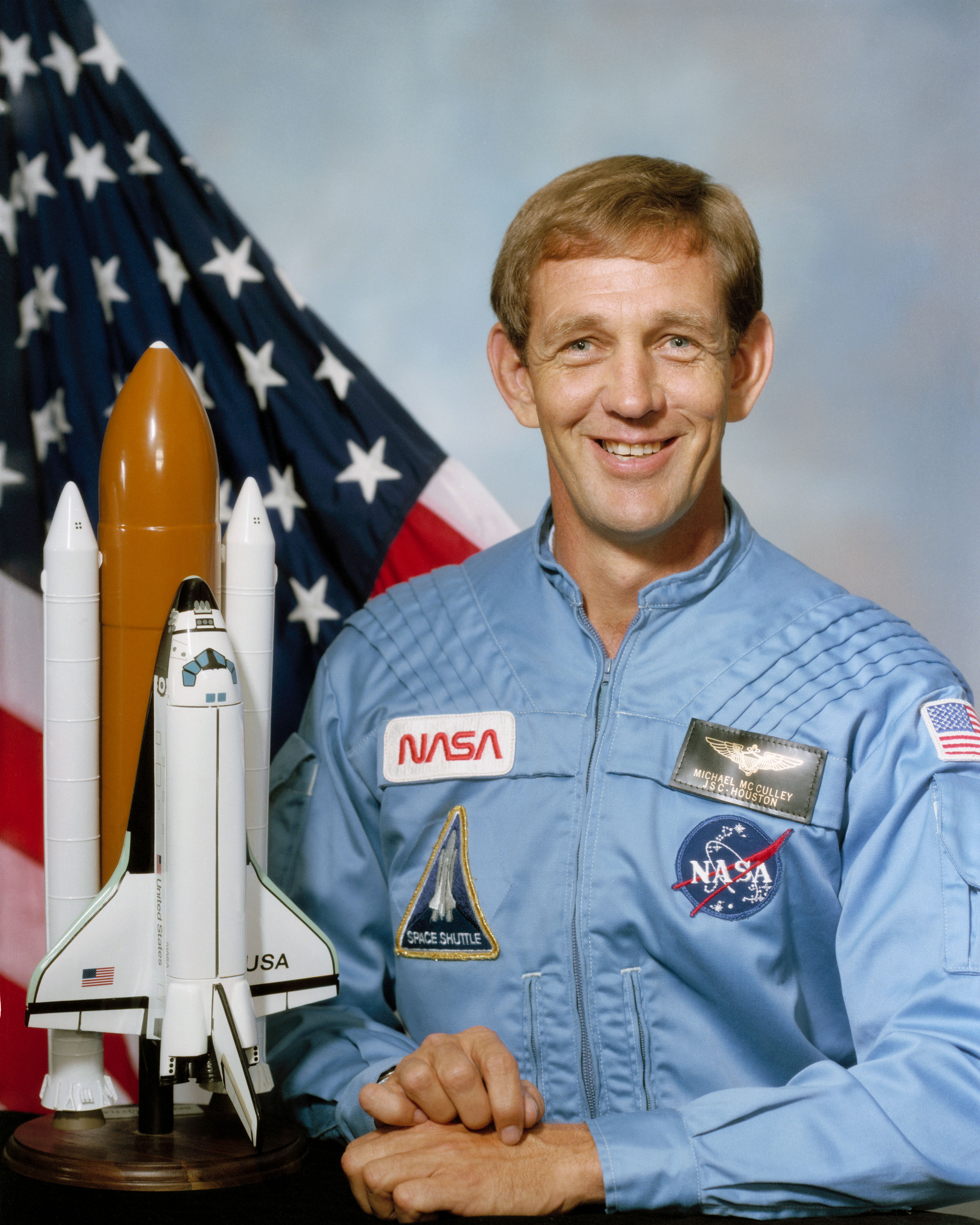
- Born: Michael James McCulley; August 4, 1943 (age 83); San Diego, California, U.S.
- Education: Purdue University (BS, MS)
- Awards: Legion of Merit; Defense Superior Service Medal
- Space career

NASA astronaut
- Rank: Captain, USN
- Time in space: 4d 23h 39m
- Selection: NASA Group 10 (1984)
- Mission: STS-34
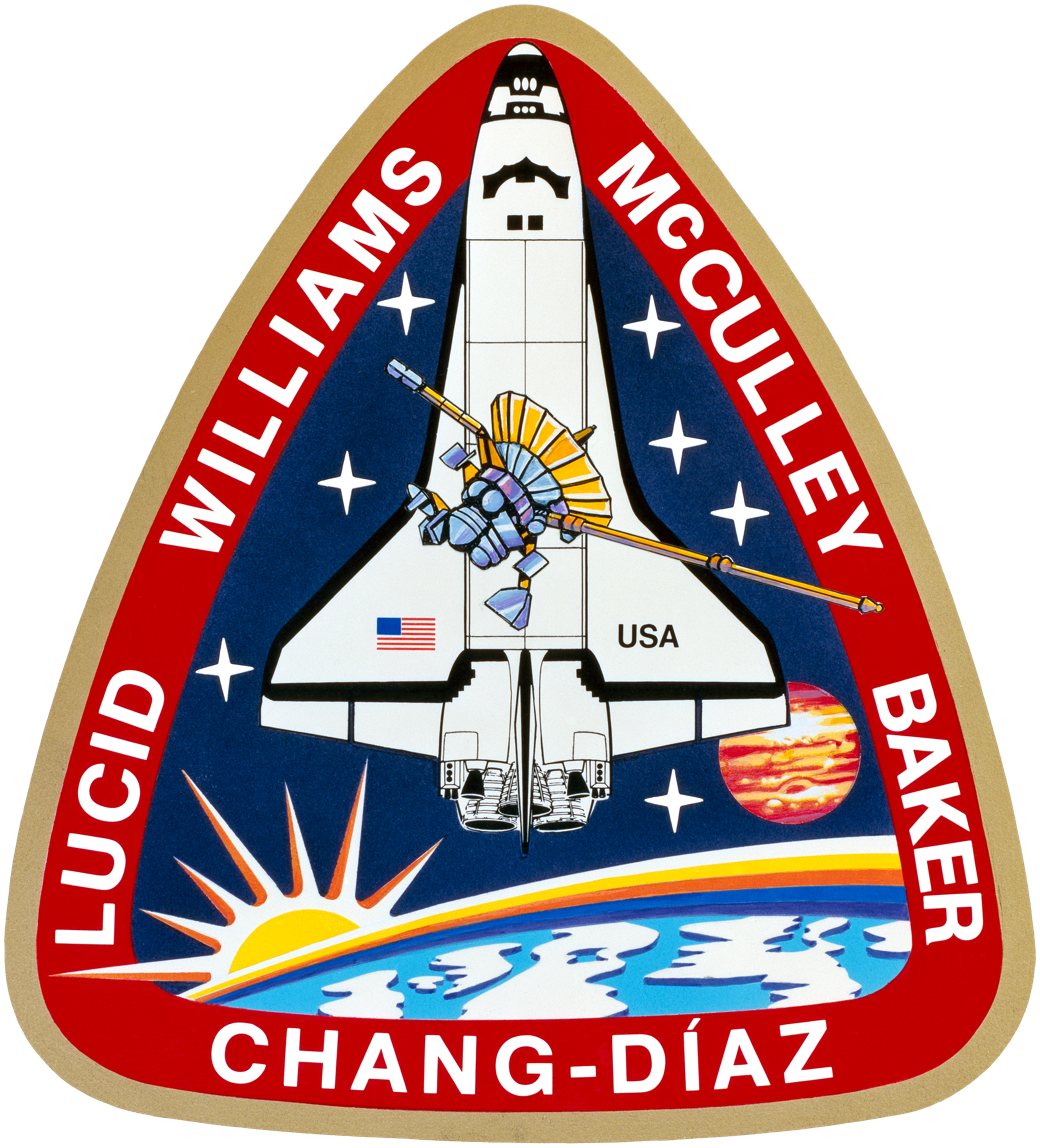
- Mission insignia
- Retired: October 1990

Michael James McCulley (born August 4, 1943) is a retired American naval officer and aviator, test pilot, metallurgical engineer, Purdue University alumni, and former NASA astronaut, and was the first submariner in space. He served as pilot on the STS-34 Atlantis mission that among other things deployed the Galileo spacecraft on its journey toward Jupiter.

From 2003 to 2007, McCulley also served as president and chief executive officer (CEO) of United Space Alliance, the contractor responsible for significant elements of space shuttle program operations.

== Personal data ==
McCulley was born on August 4, 1943, in San Diego, California. Married to the former Jane Emalie Thygeson of Melbourne, Florida with six children and fifteen grandchildren. He currently resides in Cocoa Beach, Florida.

== Education ==
He graduated from Livingston Academy in Livingston, Tennessee, in 1961. He received a Bachelor of Science and a Master of Science degrees in Metallurgical Engineering from Purdue University, both in 1970.

== Flight experience ==
After graduation from high school, McCulley enlisted in the U.S. Navy and subsequently served on one diesel-powered and two nuclear-powered submarines. In 1965 he entered Purdue University, and in January 1970, received his Officer's commission in the Navy and bachelor's and master's degrees. Following flight training, he served tours of duty in A-4 Skyhawk and A-6 Intruder aircraft, and was selected to attend the Empire Test Pilots' School in Great Britain. He served in a variety of test pilots billets at the Naval Air Test Center, Naval Air Station Patuxent River, Maryland, before returning to sea duty on USS Saratoga and USS Nimitz.

He has flown over 55 aircraft types, logging over 5,000 flying hours, and has nearly 400 carrier landings from six aircraft carriers.

== NASA career ==
Selected by NASA in May 1984, McCulley completed a one-year training and evaluation program in June 1985, qualifying him for assignment as a pilot on future Space Shuttle flight crews. His technical assignments include: Astronaut Office weather coordinator; flight crew representative to the Shuttle Requirements Control Board; Technical Assistant to the Director of Flight Crew Operations; lead of the Astronaut Support Team at the Kennedy Space Center. He flew on STS-34 in 1989 and has logged a total of 119 hours and 41 minutes in space.

He was assigned to accompany the veteran astronaut John Young on several T-38 flights.

=== Spaceflight experience ===
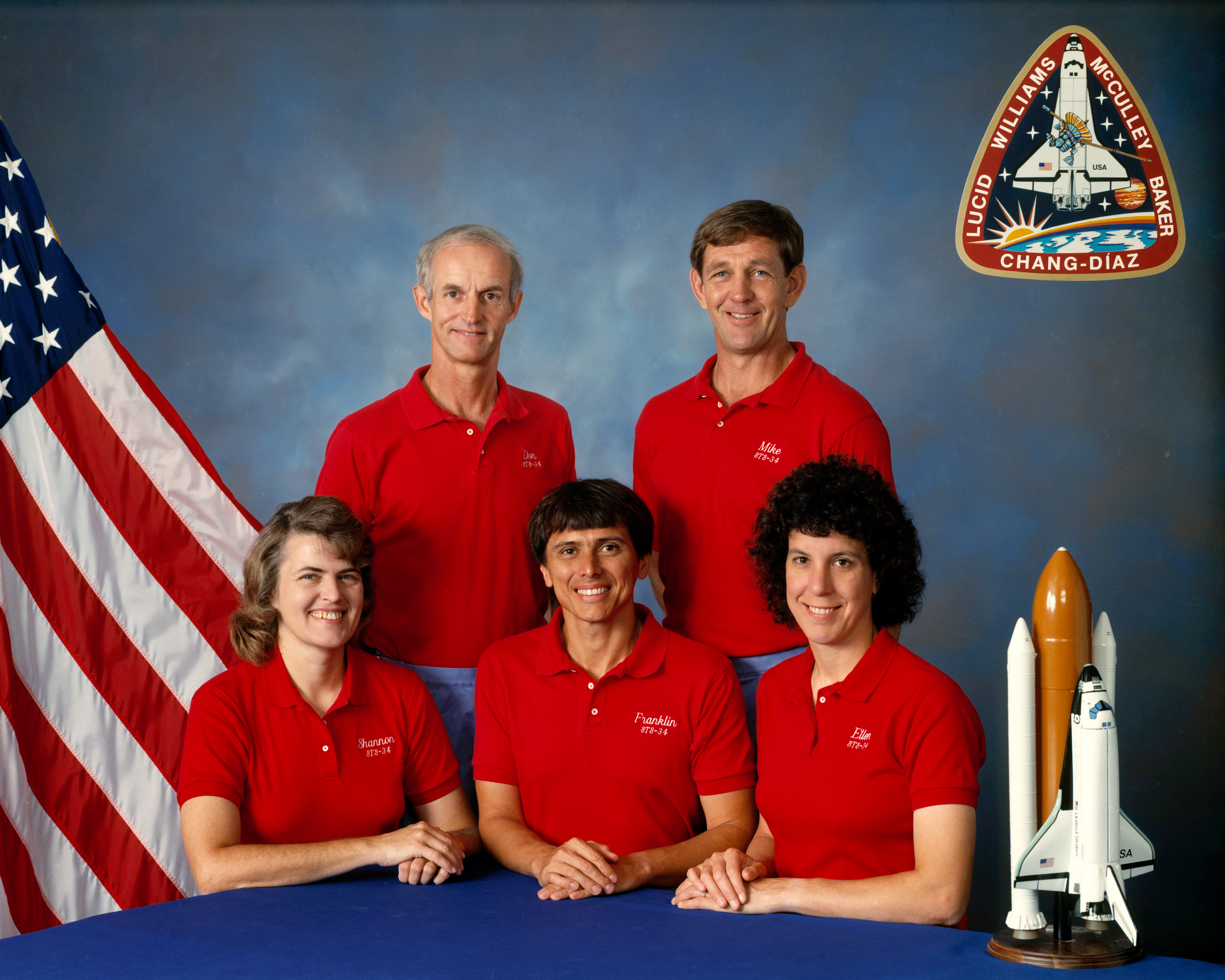
McCulley, standing 1st from right, with his STS-34 crewmates

McCulley was the pilot on mission STS-34. The crew aboard Shuttle Orbiter Atlantis launched from Kennedy Space Center, Florida on October 18, 1989, and landed at Edwards Air Force Base, California, on October 23, 1989. During the mission crew members successfully deployed the Galileo spacecraft on its journey to explore Jupiter, operated the Shuttle Solar Backscatter Ultraviolet Instrument (SSBUV) to map atmospheric ozone, and performed numerous secondary experiments involving radiation measurements, polymer morphology, lightning research, microgravity effects on plants, and a student experiment on ice crystal growth in space. Mission duration was 4 days, 23 hours, 41 minutes.

== Post-NASA career ==
In October 1990, following his retirement from NASA and the Navy, McCulley was employed by Lockheed Martin Space Operations and served as vice president and Deputy Launch Site Director for the Kennedy Space Center. He was promoted to Director in November 1995.

McCulley next served as Vice President and Associate Program Manager for USA's (United Space Alliance) Ground Operations at the Kennedy Space Center in Florida. Named to this position on June 1, 1996, he was responsible for directing the integration of all processing activities associated with America's Space Shuttle program.

In November 1999, McCulley was named chief operating officer (COO) of United Space Alliance (USA). In this role, he had primary responsibility for the day-to-day operations and overall management of USA, the Prime Contractor for the Space Shuttle program. Prior to being named COO, McCulley was Vice President and Deputy Program Manager for the Space Flight Operations Contract (SFOC), where he assisted USA's Vice President and Program Manager in the management of the Space Shuttle program.

On May 15, 2003, McCulley was named president and chief executive officer (CEO) of United Space Alliance. On September 28, 2007, McCulley retired from his position as CEO of United Space Alliance.

== Organizations ==
- Society of Experimental Test Pilots
- Association of Space Explorers
- Boy Scouts of America (Eagle Scout)
- Tau Beta Pi
- Active in community affairs, he currently serves on the curriculum advisory committee for the Purdue University College of Engineering, and on the Board of Trustees for the Clear Lake Regional Medical Center.

== Special honors ==
Awarded the Legion of Merit, Defense Superior Service Medal, Navy Commendation Medal, National Defense Service Medal, Armed Forces Expeditionary Medal, Meritorious Unit Commendation, Small Arms Expert Ribbon, NASA Space Flight Medal, and the Child Advocate of the Year Award for the state of Florida from the Children's Home Society, an organization dedicated to services for children and young mothers.

== See also ==
- List of Eagle Scouts
