= Progress 41 =

Soviet cargo spacecraft

- Mission type: Mir resupply
- COSPAR ID: 1989-023A
- SATCAT no.: 19895
- Mission duration: 39 days, 17 hours and 8 minutes

Spacecraft properties
- Spacecraft: Progress (No.149)
- Spacecraft type: Progress 7K-TG
- Manufacturer: NPO Energia

Start of mission
- Launch date: 16 March 1989, 18:54:15 UTC
- Rocket: Soyuz-U2
- Launch site: Baikonur, Site 1/5

End of mission
- Disposal: Deorbited
- Decay date: 25 April 1989, 12:02 UTC

Orbital parameters
- Reference system: Geocentric
- Regime: Low Earth
- Perigee altitude: 187 km
- Apogee altitude: 243 km
- Inclination: 51.6°
- Period: 88.8 minutes
- Epoch: 16 March 1989

Docking with Mir
- Docking port: Kvant-1 aft
- Docking date: 18 March 1989, 20:50:46 UTC
- Undocking date: 21 April 1989, 01:46:15 UTC
- Time docked: 33 days, 4 hours and 55 minutes

Progress 41 (Russian: Прогресс 41) was a Soviet unmanned Progress cargo spacecraft, which was launched in March 1989 to resupply the Mir EO-4 expedition aboard the Mir space station.

== Launch ==
Progress 41 launched on 16 March 1999 from the Baikonur Cosmodrome in the Kazakh SSR. It used a Soyuz-U2 rocket.

== Docking ==
Progress 41 docked with the aft port of the Kvant-1 module of Mir on 18 March 1989 at 20:50:46 UTC, and was undocked on 21 April 1989 at 01:46:15 UTC.

== Decay ==
It remained in orbit until 25 April 1989. Progress 41 deorbited in an uncontrolled decay, after it had run out of fuel from boosting Mir into a higher orbit. The mission ended at 12:02 UTC.

== See also ==
- 1989 in spaceflight
- List of Progress missions
- List of uncrewed spaceflights to Mir
