= Kosmos 2044 =

Soviet spacecraft aimed at biological experiments in space

Kosmos 2044 / Bion 9 Космос 2044 / Бион 9
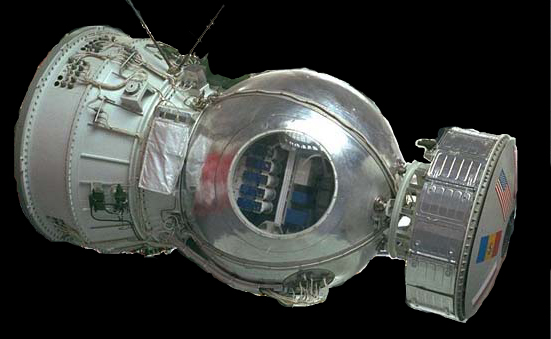
- A Bion spacecraft
- Names: Bion 9 Biocosmos 9 Biokosmos 9
- Mission type: Bioscience
- Operator: Institute for Medical and Biological Problems (IMBP)
- COSPAR ID: 1989-075A
- SATCAT no.: 20242
- Mission duration: 14 days

Spacecraft properties
- Spacecraft: Bion 9
- Spacecraft type: Bion
- Manufacturer: TsSKB
- Launch mass: 6,000 kg (13,000 lb)

Start of mission
- Launch date: 15 September 1989, 06:30:00 UTC
- Rocket: Soyuz-U 11A511U s/n T15000-599
- Launch site: Plesetsk, Site 41/1
- Contractor: TsSKB

End of mission
- Recovered by: Soviet Space Forces
- Landing date: 29 September 1989, 02:53 UTC
- Landing site: Mirny, Soviet Russia, Soviet Union

Orbital parameters
- Reference system: Geocentric orbit
- Regime: Low Earth orbit
- Perigee altitude: 216 km (134 mi)
- Apogee altitude: 294 km (183 mi)
- Inclination: 82.30°
- Period: 89.30 minutes

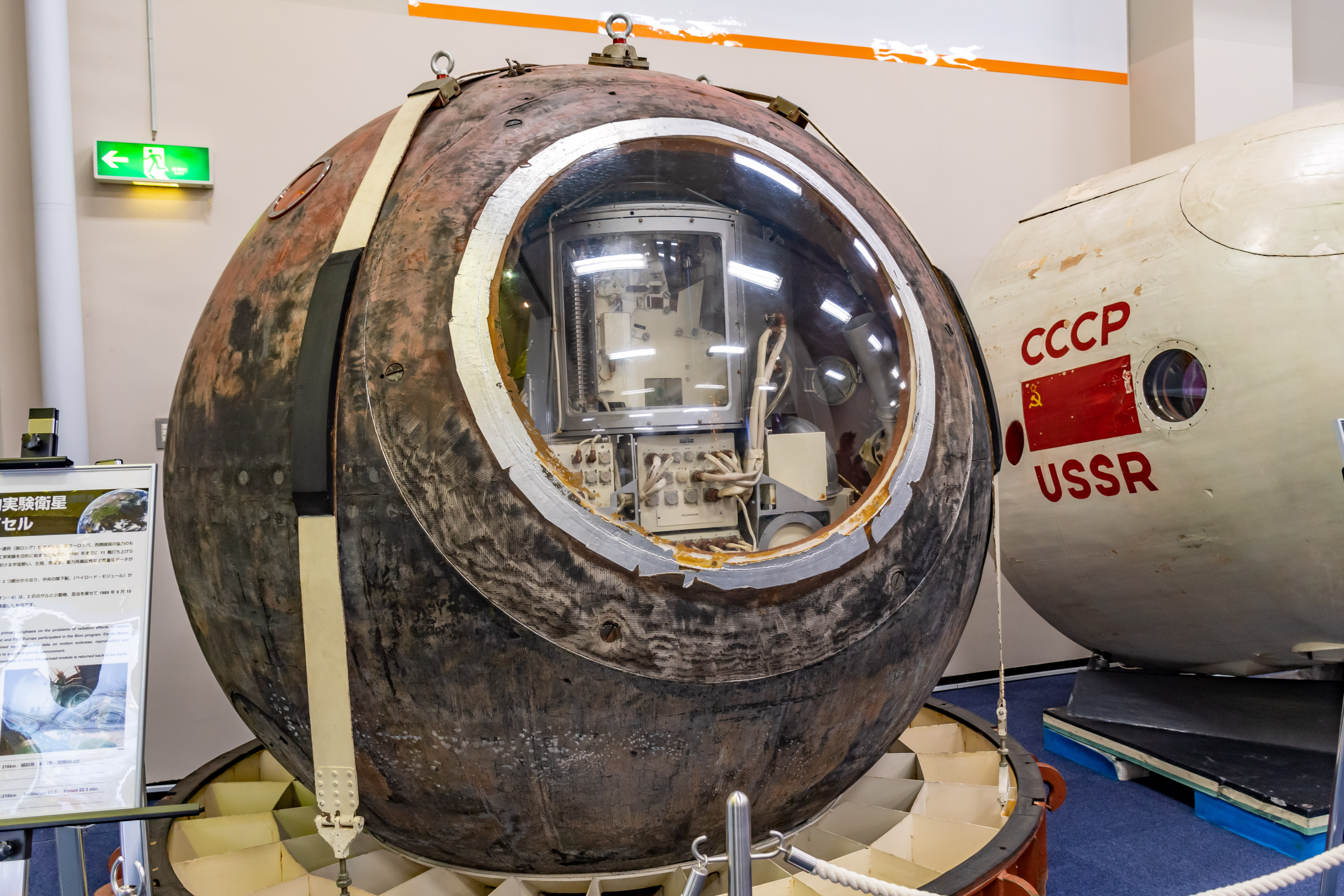
The capsule of Kosmos 2044

Kosmos 2044, or Bion 9 (in Russian: Бион 9, Космос 2044) was a biomedical research mission involving in nine countries plus ESA: United Kingdom, Hungarian People's Republic, East Germany, Polish People's Republic, Czechoslovakia, United States, Canada, Australia, Soviet Union and European Space Agency (ESA). It was part of the Bion program.

== Mission ==
Eighty experiments were conducted in such categories as motion sickness, reproduction and regeneration, immunology, and readaptation to a normal gravity environment. A number of different biological specimens were used, including rodents.

The joint United States/Soviet Union experiments were conducted on 2 rhesus monkeys and 10 male Wistar rats. The biological payload also included cell cultures (Escherichia coli). The prime occupants were two macaque monkeys. The 2.3 m diameter descent sphere was successfully recovered after 14 days, but a failure in the thermal control system resulted in the deaths of some of the specimens.

== Scientific experiments ==
The Bion 9 mission was composed of 80 scientific experiments, but only 30 experiments returned:

- Bone Biochemistry and Mineral Distribution in the Femurs of Rats: Determine the biochemical nature of the mineralization defects in the femurs of young rats after spaceflight. The institutions participating in this experiment were NASA Ames Research Center, University of North Carolina, University of Connecticut, University of California, Santa Cruz, University College in London and Institute for Medical and Biological Problems (IMBP) in Moscow).
- Biomechanical and Morphological Alteration of Intramuscular Connective Tissues: The objective of this experiment was to characterize the structural and material properties of cortical and trabecular bone samples, tendons and intervertebral disks; and to correlate the biomechanical properties of these tissues to the type and quality of structural proteins. The institutions participating in this experiment were University of Iowa, West Virginia University, University of Wisconsin-Madison and Institute for Medical and Biological Problems (IMBP).
- Gravity and Skeletal Growth: The objective of this experiment was to study bone cells, bone matrix and mineral characteristics, bone cell kinetics, and bone blood supply. The institutions participating in this experiment were NASA Ames Research Center, Indiana University, Columbia University, Saint Louis University and Institute for Medical and Biological Problems (IMBP).
- Mineral Distribution and Balance in Rats during Space Flight: The objective of this experiment was to determine the abundance and distribution of mineral components and protein (osteocalcin) within a vertebra; and to determine absorption and excretion of manganese, magnesium and zinc and their relationship to calcium balance and bone osteocalcin. The institutions participating in this experiment were University of California, San Francisco and Institute for Medical and Biological Problems (IMBP).
- Morphometric and EM Analyses of Tibial Epiphyseal Plates: The objective of this experiment was to measure the growth plate of the tibia as an index of its longitudinal growth, and to study the ultrastructure and chemical composition of the growth plate. The institutions participating in this experiment were University of Texas Medical Branch and Institute for Medical and Biological Problems (IMBP).
- Metabolic and Morphologic Properties of Muscle Fibers and Motor Neurons: The objective of this experiment was to study microgravity related muscular atrophy effects in various types of muscle and in spinal motor neurons, with emphasis on the metabolic changes. The institutions participating in this experiment were University of California, Los Angeles, University of Alberta in the Canada, University of Kansas, University of Wisconsin–Madison and Institute for Medical and Biological Problems (IMBP).
- Skeletal Muscle Atrophy: The objective of this experiment was to determine the morphological and biochemical responses of various types of muscles to microgravity. The institutions participating in this experiment were the University of Louisville in the Kentucky and Institute for Medical and Biological Problems (IMBP).
- Investigation of Microgrovity Induced Nerve and Muscle Breakdown: This experiment was a morphological, histochemical, immunocytochemical, and biochemical investigation of microgravity induced nerve and muscle breakdown. Its main objective was to study, by light and electron microscopy, the long term effects of microgravity and early readaptation to gravity on the structure of nerve and skeletal muscles; and to study the biochemistry of muscle protein breakdown. The institutions participating in this experiment were San Jose State University, Medical College of Wisconsin, Institute for Medical and Biological Problems (IMBP) and University of Sydney, Australia.
- Myosin Isoform Expression in Rodent Skeletal Muscle: The objective of this experiment was to study the effect of microgravity and contractile protein expression in antigravity and non-antigravity rodent skeletal muscle. The institutions participating in this experiment were University of California, Irvine and Institute for Medical and Biological Problems (IMBP).
- Messenger RNA Levels in Skeletal and Smooth Muscles: The objective of this experiment was to measure certain messenger RNA levels in various skeletal muscles and intestinal smooth muscle as an index of protein synthesis. Participated in the experiment the University of Texas Medical Branch and Institute for Medical and Biological Problems (IMBP).
- Measurement of Heart Atrial Natriuretic Peptide Concentrations: The objective of this experiment was to measure the cardiac hormone, which plays a role in water and salt balance, in cardiac tissue of rats exposed to spaceflight. Participated in the experiment the Institute for Medical and Biological Problems (IMBP) and NASA Ames Research Center.
- Morphological and Biochemical Examination of Heart Tissue: The objective of this experiment was to determine microgravity effects on rodent heart tissue (ventricle). Participated in the experiment the University of Chicago, University of California, Irvine, University of Texas Medical Branch, the NASA Ames Research Center, Baylor University, Texas, and Institute for Medical and Biological Problems (IMBP).
- Hepatic Function in Rats After Space Flight: The objective of this experiment was to determine the effect of microgravity on liver and plasma constituents, on the ability of the liver to metabolize food stuffs and foreign substances, and on liver histology. The institutions participating in this experiment were Emory University, University of Louisville and Institute for Medical and Biological Problems (IMBP).
- Erythroid Colony Formation In Vitro and Erythropoietin Determinations: The objective of this experiment was to determine the effect of microgravity on the red blood cell production of rodents. Participated in the experiment the University of Tennessee, the Institute of Developmental Biology (U.S.S.R.), the Institute of Biophysics (Czechoslovakia) and Institute for Medical and Biological Problems (IMBP).
- Rat Testis Morphology and Physiology: The objective of this experiment was to determine the effects of microgravity on rodent testis physiology. The institutions participating in this experiment were Institute for Medical and Biological Problems (IMBP), Colorado State University, Columbia University, Pennsylvania State University and Johns Hopkins University.
- Structural Changes and Cell Turnover in the Rats Small Intestine: The objective of this experiment was to determine the structural changes and cell turnover in the small intestines of rats as a result of spaceflight. Participated in the experiment the Colorado State University and Institute for Medical and Biological Problems (IMBP).
- Effects of Muscle Atrophy on Motor End Plates: The objective of this experiment was to determine the effects of spaceflight on neurotransmitter receptors of the brain and spinal cord, and on the morphology and histochemistry of nerve-muscle junctions. Specifically, it studied the muscarinic and gaba (benzodiazepine) receptors in the sensory-motor cortex and spinal cord. The institutions participating in this experiment were the NASA Ames Research Center and Institute for Medical and Biological Problems (IMBP).
- Pineal Physiology in Microgravity and Its Relation to Gonadal Function: The objective of this experiment was to determine the effect of microgravity on selected pineal gland neurotransmitters associated with rodent circadian rhythm control and correlate this with testis function. Participated in the experiment the Institute for Medical and Biological Problems (IMBP), the San Jose State University and the Florida A&M University.
- Pituitary Oxytocin and Vasopressin Content: The objective of this experiment was to determine the effect of microgravity on two pituitary hormones (oxytocin and vasopressin) involved in water balance. Participated in the experiment the NASA Ames Research Center and Institute for Medical and Biological Problems (IMBP).
- Study of the Effect of Microgravity on Enzymes: The objective of this experiment was to study the effect of microgravity on 1) metabolic enzymes of type I, IIA, and IIB muscle fibers; and on 2) metabolic enzymes, neurotransmitter amino acids, and neurotransmitter associated enzymes in selected regions of the central nervous system. Participated in the experiment the Washington University School of Medicine and Institute for Medical and Biological Problems (IMBP).
- Growth Hormone Regulation, Synthesis and Secretion in Microgravity: The objective of this experiment was to study growth hormone physiology in rodents during spaceflight. The institutions participating in this experiment were Pennsylvania State University, Institute for Medical and Biological Problems (IMBP), NASA Ames Research Center and Salk Institute of Biological Studies.
- Effect of Space Flight on Level and Function of Immune Cells: The objective of this experiment was to determine the effects of spaceflight on various immunological parameters using rat spleen, bone marrow cells and lymphocytes. Participated the NASA Johnson Space Center, Pennsylvania State University, University of Louisville and Institute for Medical and Biological Problems (IMBP).
- Histologic Examination of Lung Tissue: The objective of this experiment was to determine the effect of microgravity on rat lung tissue. Participated the University of California, San Diego and Institute for Medical and Biological Problems (IMBP).
- Rodent Tissue Repair: The objective of this experiment was to determine the effects of microgravity on the repair of skin connective tissue and skeletal muscle. The institutions participating in this experiment were the University of Kansas, Institute for Medical and Biological Problems (IMBP), West Virginia University and the University of Wisconsin–Madison.
- Adaptation of Optokinetic Nystagmus to Microgravity: The objective of this experiment was to study primate eye movement responses in an upright position and at various angles of tilt, before and after spaceflight. The institutions participating in this experiment were Brooklyn College in New York City, Mount Sinai Medical Center and Institute for Medical and Biological Problems (IMBP).
- Studies of Vestibular Primary Afferents In Normal, Hyper- and Hypogravity: The objective of this experiment was to study the effect of microgravity on a primates vestibular system by measuring brain and eye movement responses to rotational stimuli preflight and postflight. Participated in the experiment University of Texas Medical Branch and Institute for Medical and Biological Problems (IMBP).
- Functional Neuromuscular Adaption to Spaceflight: The objective of this experiment was to study primate electromyographic activity (EMG) and to determine its importance to the maintenance of normal muscle properties. The biochemical and morphological effects of microgravity on muscles was also studied. Participated in the experiment University of California, Los Angeles (UCLA), Institute for Medical and Biological Problems (IMBP) and Moscow Medical Institute.
- Biological Rhythm and Temperature Regulation: The objective of this experiment was to determine the functioning of a primate's circadian rhythm and thermoregulatory systems. Participated in the experiment the University of California, Davis and Institute for Medical and Biological Problems (IMBP).
- Rhesus Monkey Metabolism during Spaceflight: The objective of this experiment was to determine the metabolic rates of primates during spaceflight. Participated in the experiment the University of California, Davis and Institute for Medical and Biological Problems (IMBP).
- Radiation Dosimetry and Spectrometry - Passive Systems The objective of this experiment was to conduct a set of radiation measurements with passive detectors in order to study high and low energy neutrons, various flux and energy spectra, and the attenuation of space radiation as a function of shielding. The institutions participating in this experiment were the NASA Marshall Space Flight Center, University of San Francisco and Institute for Medical and Biological Problems (IMBP).

== See also ==
- 1989 in spaceflight
- Animals in space
