= Aleksandr Nikolayevich Balandin =

Soviet cosmonaut (born 1953)

Aleksandr Balandin
- Александр Баландин
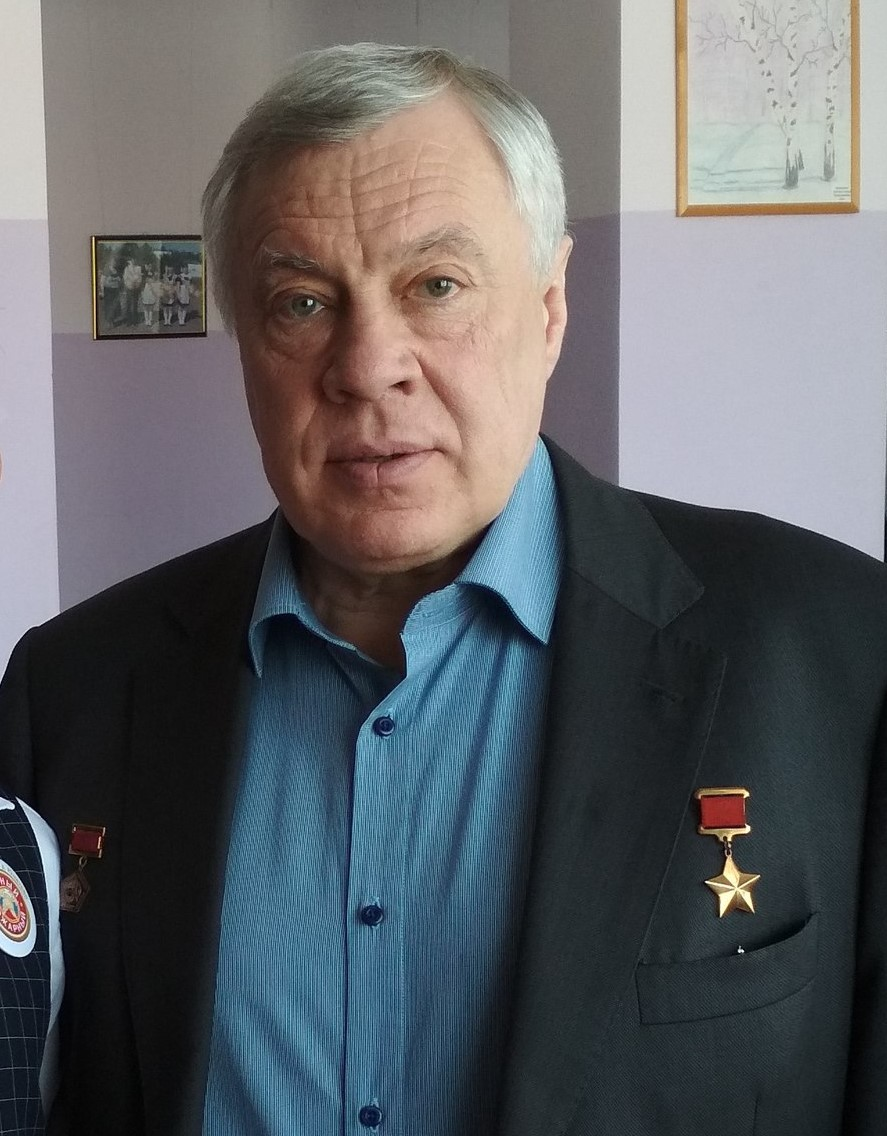
- Balandin in 2022
- Born: July 30, 1953 (age 73); Moscow Oblast, Russian SFSR, Soviet Union
- Occupation: Flight engineer
- Awards: Hero of the Soviet Union
- Space career

Cosmonaut
- Status: Retired
- Time in space: 179d 01h 17m
- Selection: 1978 Cosmonaut Group
- Total EVAs: 2
- Total EVA time: 10h, 47m
- Missions: Soyuz TM-9 (Mir EO-6)

Aleksandr Nikolayevich Balandin (Russian: Александр Николаевич Баландин; born July 30, 1953) is a Russian cosmonaut. He is married with two children. He was selected as a cosmonaut on December 1, 1978, and retired on October 17, 1994.

He flew as a flight engineer on Soyuz TM-9.

He worked at NPO Energia until 1994, and was then President of Lendint-Association until 2000.

== Biography ==
He was born on July 30, 1953, in Fryazino. In 1970, he graduated from high school in Fryazino, and in 1976, the Bauman Moscow State Technical University, with specialty - Flight Dynamics and Control. He worked as an engineer in the Moscow region at the Scientific Production Association (SPA) "Energy".

On December 8, 1978, he was enrolled in the cosmonaut detachment (the 5th recruitment of civilian specialists from SPA Energia), and was prepared for flying at the Buran reusable spacecraft (1979-1984), Soyuz-TM spacecraft and Mir space station. In September 1989 - flight engineer of the backup crew of the Soyuz TM-8. On September 5, 1989, Soyuz TM-8 Union reached the orbit with the main crew (Aleksandr Serebrov and Aleksandr Viktorenko).

== Awards ==
- Hero of the Soviet Union
- Pilot-Cosmonaut of the USSR
- Order of Lenin
- Medal "For Merit in Space Exploration"
- Order of Bernardo O'Higgins
