= Mir EO-6 =

Sixth expedition to Mir space station

- Mission type: Mir expedition
- Mission duration: 179 days, 1 hours, 17 minutes (launch to landing)
- Orbits completed: 2,833

Expedition
- Space station: Mir
- Began: 11 February 1990
- Ended: 9 August 1990, 04:08:49 UTC
- Arrived aboard: Soyuz TM-9
- Departed aboard: Soyuz TM-9

Crew
- Crew size: Two
- Members: Anatoli Soloviyov; Aleksandr Balandin

Mir EO-6 was the sixth long duration expedition to the space station Mir. The two crew members were Anatoli Soloviyov (Commander) and Aleksandr Balandin (Flight Engineer).

== Crew ==
Mir EO-6	Name	Spaceflight	Launch	Landing	Duration
Commander	(Soviet Union) Anatoli Soloviyov	Second	11 February 1990; Soyuz TM-9	9 August 1990; Soyuz TM-9	179 days
Flight Engineer	(Soviet Union) Aleksandr Balandin	Only	11 February 1990; Soyuz TM-9	9 August 1990; Soyuz TM-9	179 days

The backup crew for this expedition were Gennadi Manakov (Commander) and Gennadi Strekalov (Flight Engineer).

== Overview ==
=== Crew arrival ===
The two crew members arrived at Mir via Soyuz TM-9, which launched on 11 February 1990. The Soyuz spacecraft docked on to the Kvant2 Complex.

=== Mission highlights ===
While on board, the crew conducted an extensive programme of geophysical and astrophysical research, experiments on biology and biotechnology and work on space materials science. They started the commercial production of crystal in highest quality for a US electronics company. A protein grow experiment was also profitable (25 million rubels). A first EVA was conducted on 17 July 1990, lasting 7h 16m, in which Soyuz TM-9 was repaired after three of eight thermal blankets had come loose near the heat shield. Another EVA was performed on 26 July 1990 (3h 31m), in order to repair the Kvant2 Module hatch, but this failed.

=== Expedition conclusion ===
The crew left on Soyuz TM-9 on 9 August 1990. The expedition in total lasted 179 days, 1 hour and 17 minutes. The crew completed 2833 orbits of the Earth.

== See also ==
- 1990 in spaceflight
