= STS-34 =

1989 American crewed spaceflight to deploy Galileo

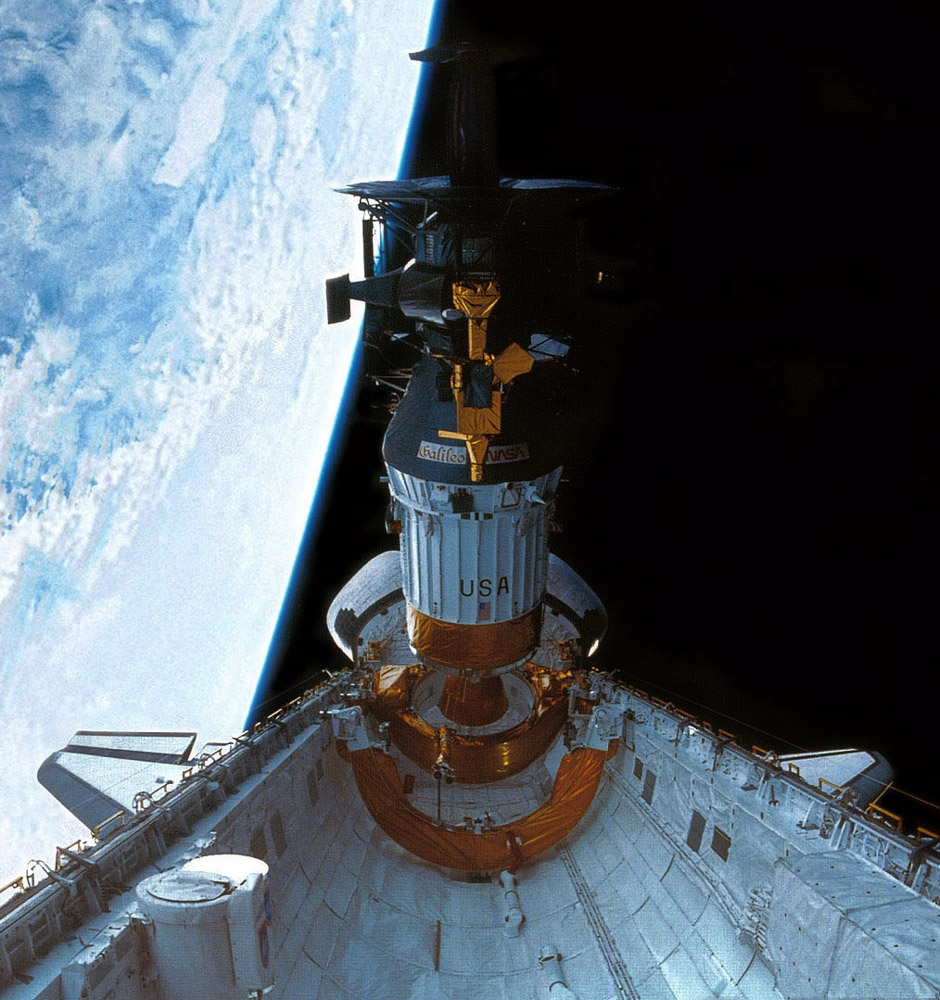
- Galileo and its Inertial Upper Stage (IUS) in the payload bay of Atlantis
- Names: Space Transportation System-34; STS-34
- Mission type: Galileo spacecraft deployment
- Operator: NASA
- COSPAR ID: 1989-084A
- SATCAT no.: 20297
- Mission duration: 4 days, 23 hours, 39 minutes, 20 seconds
- Distance travelled: 2,900,000 km (1,800,000 mi)
- Orbits completed: 79

Spacecraft properties
- Spacecraft: Space Shuttle Atlantis
- Launch mass: 116,831 kg (257,568 lb)
- Landing mass: 88,881 kg (195,949 lb)
- Payload mass: 22,064 kg (48,643 lb)

Crew
- Crew size: 5
- Members: Donald E. Williams; Michael J. McCulley; Shannon Lucid; Franklin Chang-Díaz; Ellen S. Baker

Start of mission
- Launch date: October 18, 1989, 16:53:40 UTC (12:53:40 pm EDT)
- Launch site: Kennedy, LC-39B
- Contractor: Rockwell International

End of mission
- Landing date: October 23, 1989, 16:33:00 UTC (9:33 am PDT)
- Landing site: Edwards, Runway 23

Orbital parameters
- Reference system: Geocentric orbit
- Regime: Low Earth orbit
- Perigee altitude: 298 km (185 mi)
- Apogee altitude: 307 km (191 mi)
- Inclination: 34.33°
- Period: 90.60 minutes

Instruments
- Growth Hormone Concentration and Distribution in Plants experiment; Mesoscale Lightning Experiment (MLE); Polymer Morphology (PM); Shuttle Solar Backscatter Ultraviolet (SSBUV)
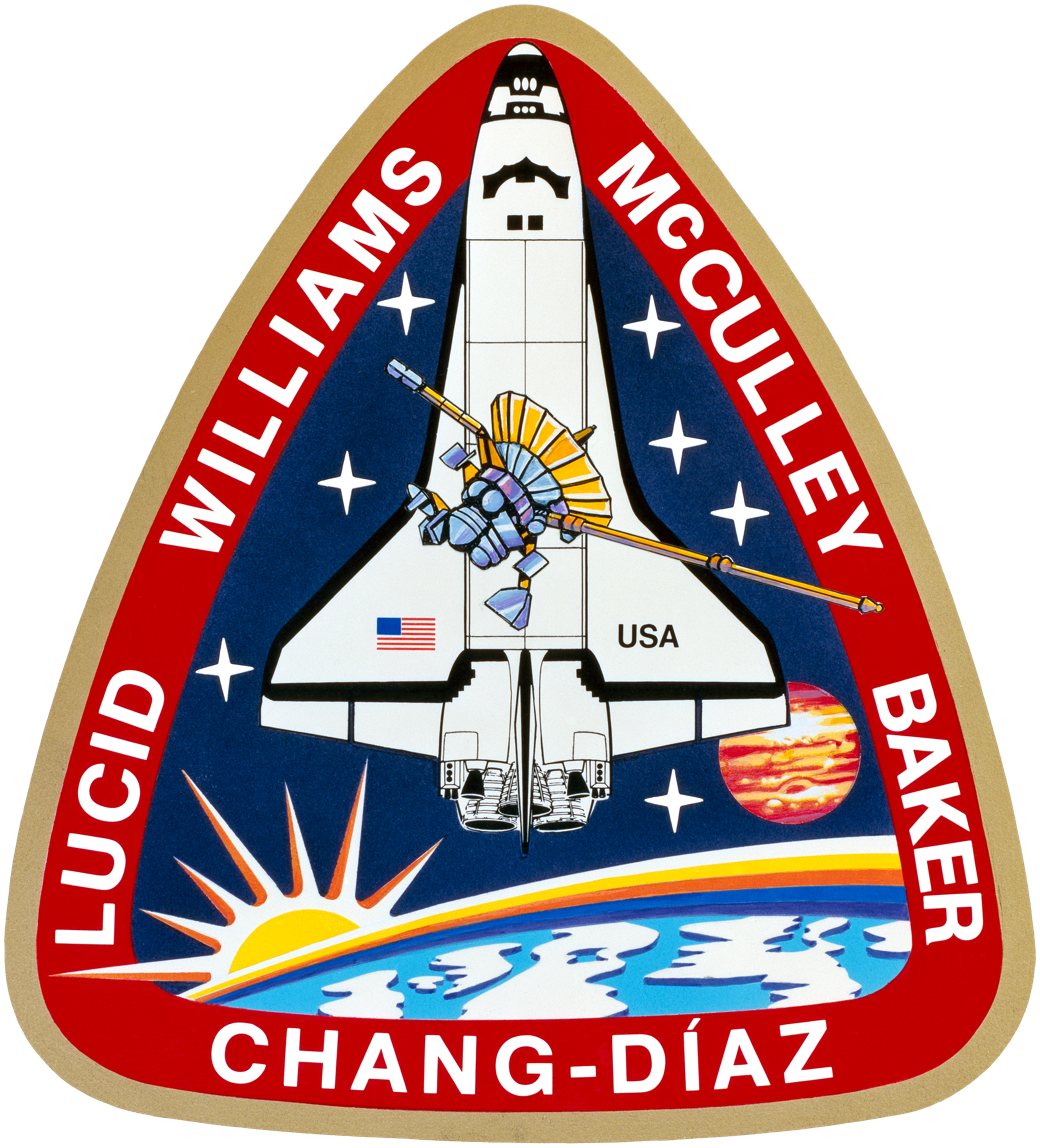
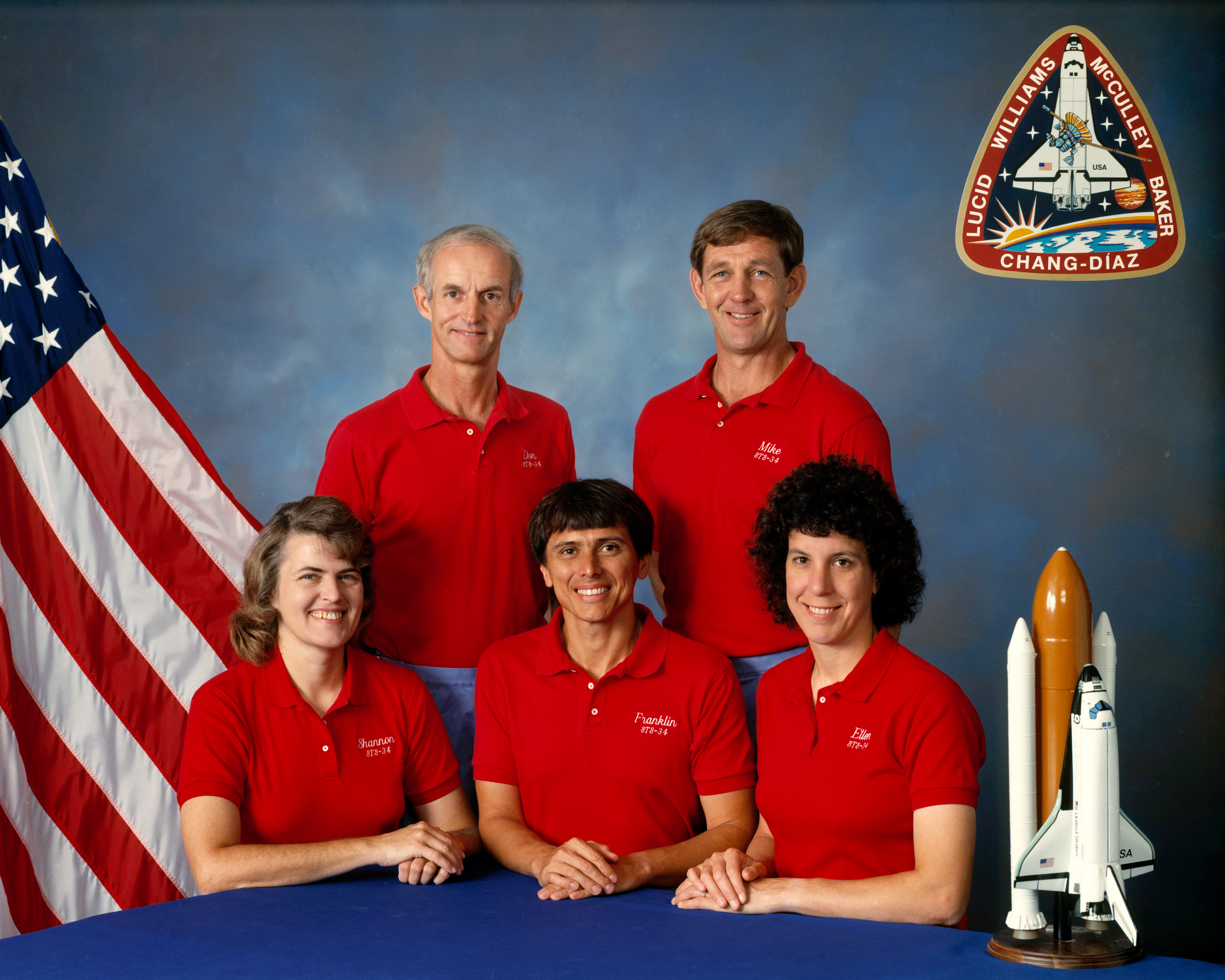
- STS-34 mission patch Back row: Williams and McCulley; Front row: Lucid, Chang-Díaz and Baker Space Shuttle program

STS-34 was a NASA Space Shuttle mission using Atlantis. It was the 31st shuttle mission overall, and the fifth flight for Atlantis. STS-34 launched from Kennedy Space Center, Florida, on October 18, 1989, and landed at Edwards Air Force Base, California, on October 23, 1989. It was also the first shuttle mission since the Challenger disaster to have two female astronauts on board. During the mission, the Jupiter-bound Galileo probe was deployed into space.

== Crew ==
Position	Astronaut
Commander	(United States) Donald E. Williams; Second and last spaceflight
Pilot	(United States) Michael J. McCulley; Only spaceflight
Mission Specialist 1	(United States) Shannon Lucid; Second spaceflight
Mission Specialist 2 Flight Engineer	(United States) / (Costa Rica) Franklin Chang-Díaz; Second spaceflight
Mission Specialist 3	(United States) Ellen S. Baker; First spaceflight

=== Crew seat assignments ===
Seat	Launch	Landing	Seats 1–4 are on the flight deck. Seats 5–7 are on the mid-deck.
1	Williams		Seats 1–4 are on the flight deck. Seats 5–7 are on the mid-deck.
2	McCulley		Seats 1–4 are on the flight deck. Seats 5–7 are on the mid-deck.
3	Lucid	Baker	Seats 1–4 are on the flight deck. Seats 5–7 are on the mid-deck.
4	Chang-Díaz		Seats 1–4 are on the flight deck. Seats 5–7 are on the mid-deck.
5	Baker	Lucid	Seats 1–4 are on the flight deck. Seats 5–7 are on the mid-deck.
6	Unused		Seats 1–4 are on the flight deck. Seats 5–7 are on the mid-deck.
7	Unused		Seats 1–4 are on the flight deck. Seats 5–7 are on the mid-deck.

== Mission summary ==
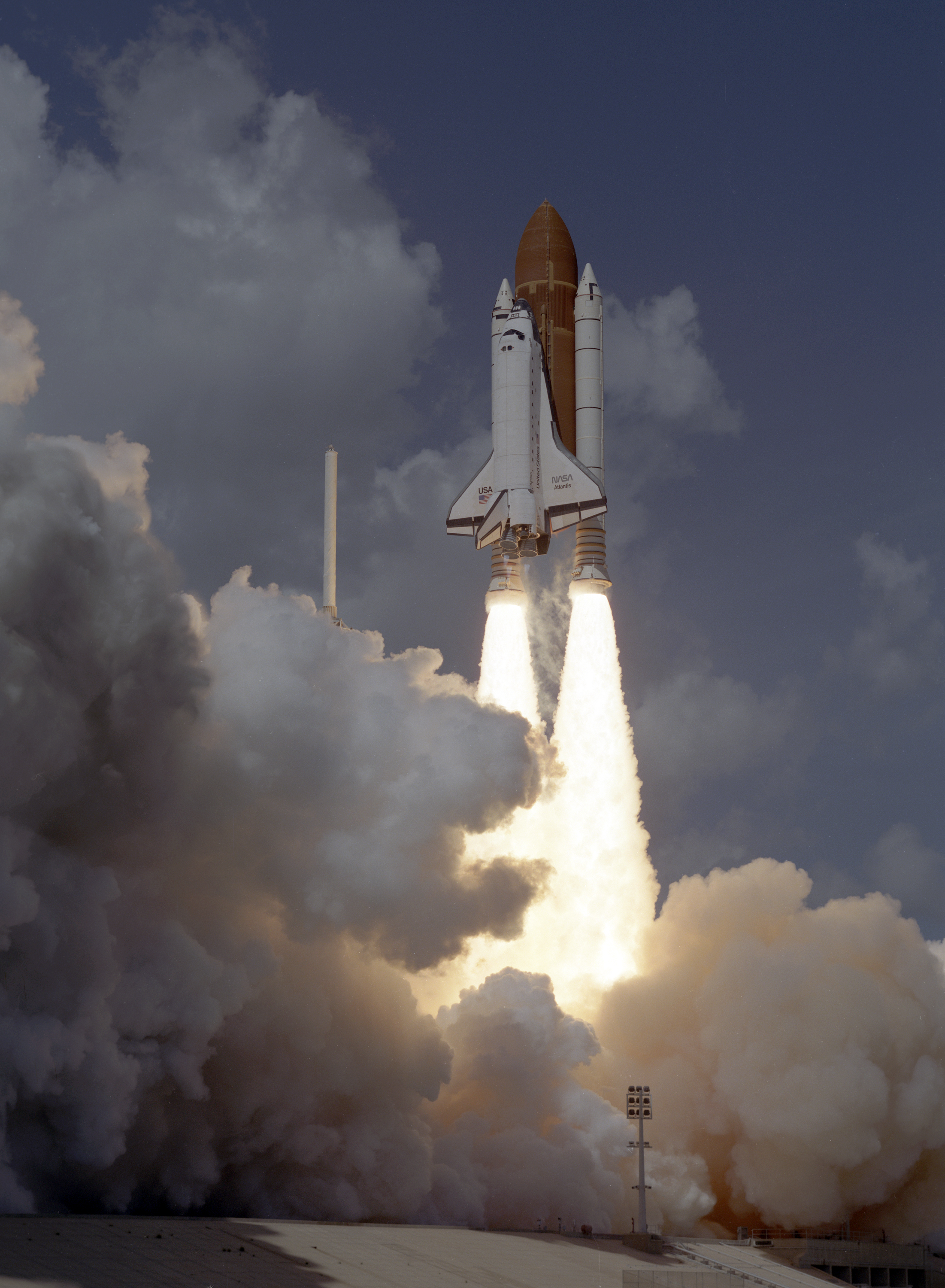
Liftoff of Atlantis

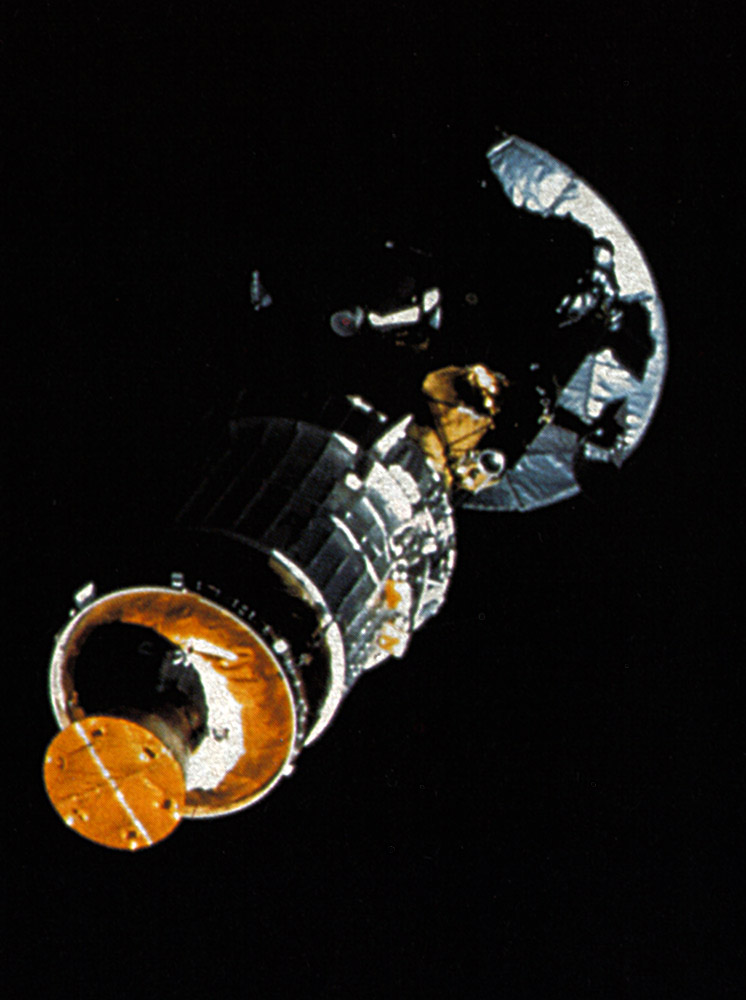
Galileo heads for Jupiter.

Attempt	Planned	Result	Turnaround	Reason	Decision point	Weather go (%)	Notes
1	12 Oct 1989, 1:29:00 pm	Scrubbed	—	Technical	11 Oct 1989, 4:00 pm (T−19:00:00)	75	Faulty SSME controller in engine no. 2.
2	17 Oct 1989, 12:57:00 pm	Scrubbed	4 days 23 hours 28 minutes	Weather	17 Oct 1989, 1:15 pm (T−00:05:00)	80, later 60	Rain at Shuttle Landing Facility.
3	18 Oct 1989, 12:53:40 pm	Success	0 days 23 hours 57 minutes				Countdown clock held at T−5 minutes to change TAL sites.

Atlantis lifted off from Launch Complex 39B, Kennedy Space Center (KSC), at 12:53:40 EDT on October 18, 1989. It carried the Jupiter-bound Galileo spacecraft in its cargo bay. The countdown was delayed at T-minus 5 minutes for 3 minutes and 40 seconds to update the onboard computer for a change in the Transoceanic Abort Landing (TAL) site. The TAL site was changed from Ben Guerir Air Base, Morocco, to Zaragoza Air Base, Spain, because of heavy rain at Ben Guerir.

The launch was originally targeted for October 12, 1989, the first day of a 41-day launch period during which the planets were properly aligned for a direct flight to Jupiter. The liftoff was rescheduled for October 17, 1989, to replace a faulty main engine controller for Space Shuttle Main Engine No. 2. It was postponed again until October 18, 1989, because of rain-showers within 32 kilometres (20 mi; 17 nmi) of Kennedy Space Center's Shuttle Landing Facility. The weather conditions were in violation of the launch commit criteria for a Return To Launch Site (RTLS) landing in the event of an aborted flight.

The primary payload, the Galileo spacecraft with its attached Inertial Upper Stage (IUS), was successfully deployed on its journey to Jupiter. STS-34 was only the second shuttle flight to deploy a planetary spacecraft, the first being STS-30, which deployed the Magellan spacecraft.

Galileo became the first spacecraft to orbit an outer Solar System planet and to penetrate the atmosphere of an outer planet. Also, the spacecraft was scheduled to make the first extended observations of the Jovian system and first direct sampling of Jupiter's atmosphere, as well as the first asteroid flybys.

Several anomalies occurred during the flight, but none had a major impact on the mission. On October 22, 1989, an alarm woke the shuttle crew when the gas generator fuel pump system A heaters on Auxiliary Power Unit (APU) 2 failed to recycle at the upper limits of the system. There were also some minor problems with the Flash Evaporator System for cooling the orbiter, and the cryogenic oxygen manifold valve 2, which was left closed for the rest of the mission. A Hasselblad camera jammed twice, and a spare camera had to be used.

Chang-Díaz described his second flight as much more "subdued". Demonstrators protested at launch time against the flight because the Galileo spacecraft, the mission's payload, was powered by a radioisotope thermoelectric generator. Díaz also claimed the flight was almost aborted in orbit three times because of malfunctions, but continued because the alternative was to land Atlantis, carrying Galileo and its generator, at an airport in Senegal, which could have caused an "international incident", according to the astronaut. He identified the deployment of Galileo as another tricky part of the mission as he only had a tight six-second opportunity to succeed.

On October 21, 1989, Costa Rican President Dr. Óscar Arias talked in Spanish with Chang-Díaz, a native of Costa Rica, and greeted the other crew members via a special telephone linkup. Arias told Chang-Díaz, "You raise high the name of Costa Rica and Latin America in general". Chang-Díaz also explained the mission's objectives in Spanish to Costa Rican listeners on the ground.

Because of high winds predicted at the planned landing time, reentry was moved two orbits earlier. Atlantis landed on Runway 23 at Edwards Air Force Base in California at 16:33:00 UTC (9:33 am PDT local time at the landing site) on October 23, 1989 after a mission duration of 4 days, 23 hours, 39 minutes, and 20 seconds.

=== Payload and experiments ===
The mission's primary task was to deploy the Galileo spacecraft with its attached IUS booster. Deployment occurred on schedule at 19:15 EDT on October 18, 1989, slightly more than six hours after launch, and the IUS successfully boosted Galileo toward Venus on the first leg of its six-year journey to Jupiter. The spacecraft was injected on a Venus transfer orbit at 20:20 EDT, and separated from the IUS 47 minutes later.

Galileo required a triple gravity assist – from Venus, Earth, and then Earth again – to propel it from the inner part of the Solar System to Jupiter in the outer system. The trajectory made it possible to also observe asteroids 951 Gaspra and 243 Ida. Galileo had two major components: an orbiter which examined Jupiter and its four largest moons for eight years, and a probe which descended into the Jovian atmosphere to take direct samplings before being destroyed by the gas giant's heat and pressure.

Besides the Galileo spacecraft, Atlantis' payload bay held two canisters containing the Shuttle Solar Backscatter Ultraviolet (SSBUV) experiment. SSBUV, which made its first flight on STS-34, was developed by NASA to check the calibration of the ozone sounders on free-flying satellites, and to verify the accuracy of atmospheric ozone and solar irradiance data. The experiment operated successfully.

STS-34 carried a further five mid-deck experiments, all of which were deemed successful, including the Polymer Morphology (PM) experiment, sponsored by the 3M company under a joint endeavor agreement with NASA. The PM experiment was designed to observe the melting and resolidifying of different types of polymers while in orbit. The Mesoscale Lightning Experiment (MLE), which had been flown on previous shuttle missions, observed the visual characteristics of large-scale lightning in the upper atmosphere.

The crew successfully troubleshot a student experiment on ice crystal growth. The experiment's first activation did not produce crystals because the supercooled water formed an ice slag on the cooling plate. The crew turned the experiment off, allowing the ice to thaw, and then redispersed the liquid. Several crystals formed. On October 22, 1989, Lucid and Baker completed the Growth Hormone Concentration and Distribution in Plants experiment by freezing samples of corn seedlings grown in orbit during the mission.

In the cabin, the crew operated an IMAX (70 mm) camera, last flown on STS-29. Werner Herzog's 2005 film The Wild Blue Yonder featured footage filmed on the flight.

Chang-Díaz and Baker, a medical doctor, performed a detailed supplementary objective by photographing and videotaping the veins and arteries in the retinal wall of Baker's eyeball to provide detailed measurements which might give clues about a possible relationship between cranial pressure and motion sickness. Baker also tested the effectiveness of anti-motion sickness medication in space.

== Wake-up calls ==
NASA began a tradition of playing music to astronauts during the Project Gemini, and first used music to wake up a flight crew during Apollo 15. Each track is specially chosen, often by the astronauts' families, and usually has a special meaning to an individual member of the crew, or is applicable to their daily activities.

Flight Day	Song	Artist/Composer	Played for
Day 2	"Hail Purdue"		Donald E. Williams
Day 3	University of Oklahoma fight song		Shannon W. Lucid
Day 4	"Bohemian Rhapsody"	Queen	
Day 5	"Centerfield"	John Fogerty	Sports fans onboard
Day 6	"Fly Like An Eagle"	Steve Miller Band	

== Gallery ==
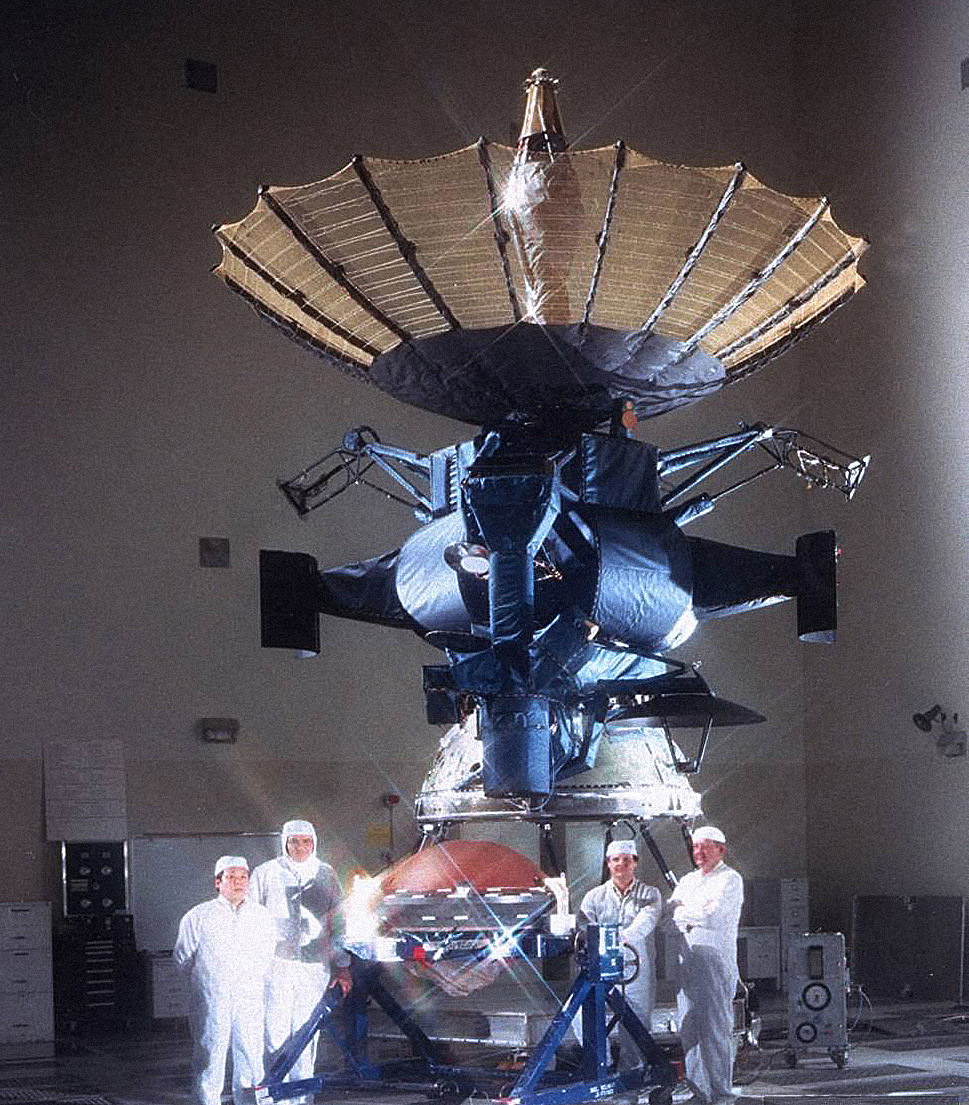
Galileo being prepared prior to launch.

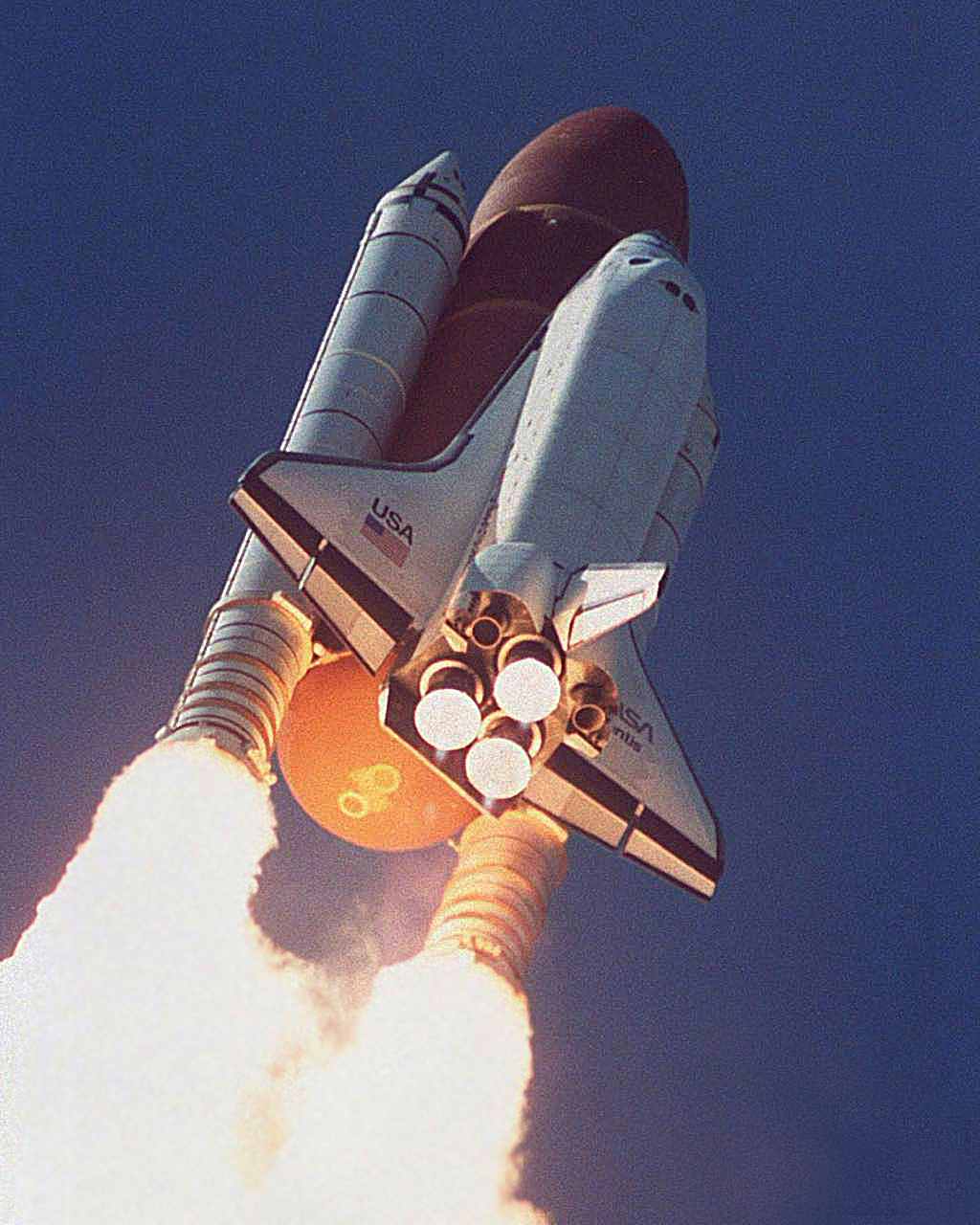
The launch viewed from below.

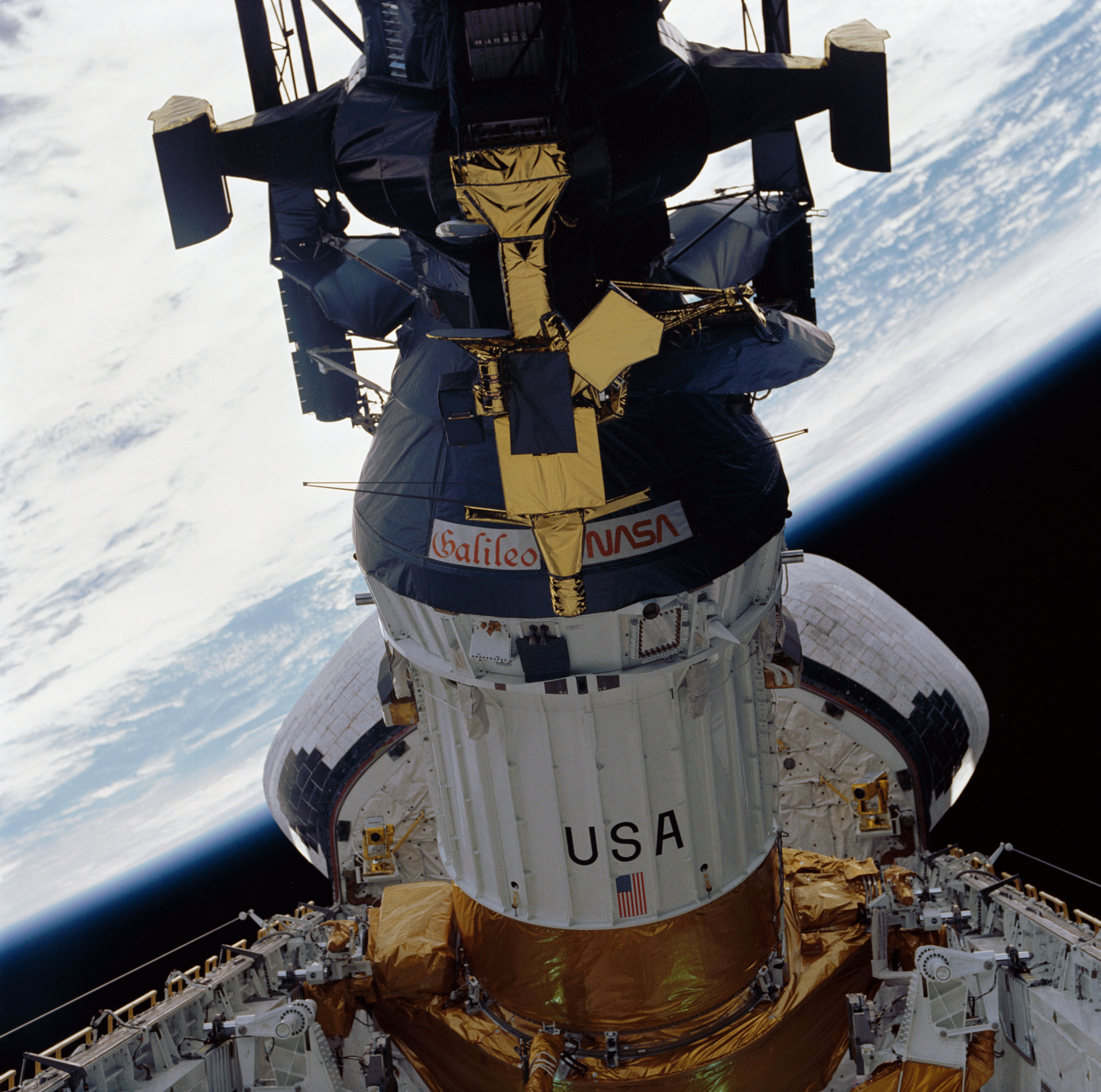
Galileo prior to release

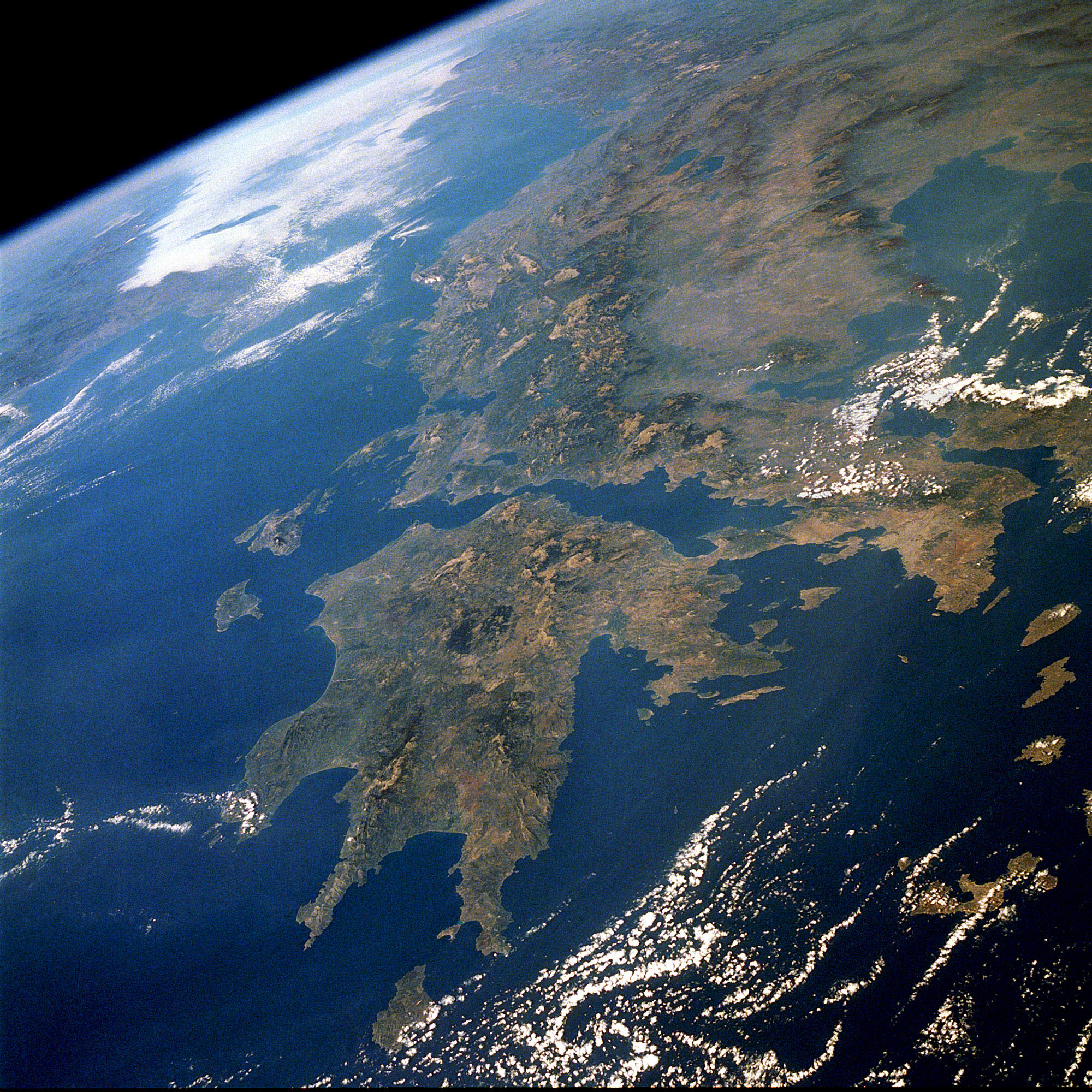
Greece imaged from orbit.

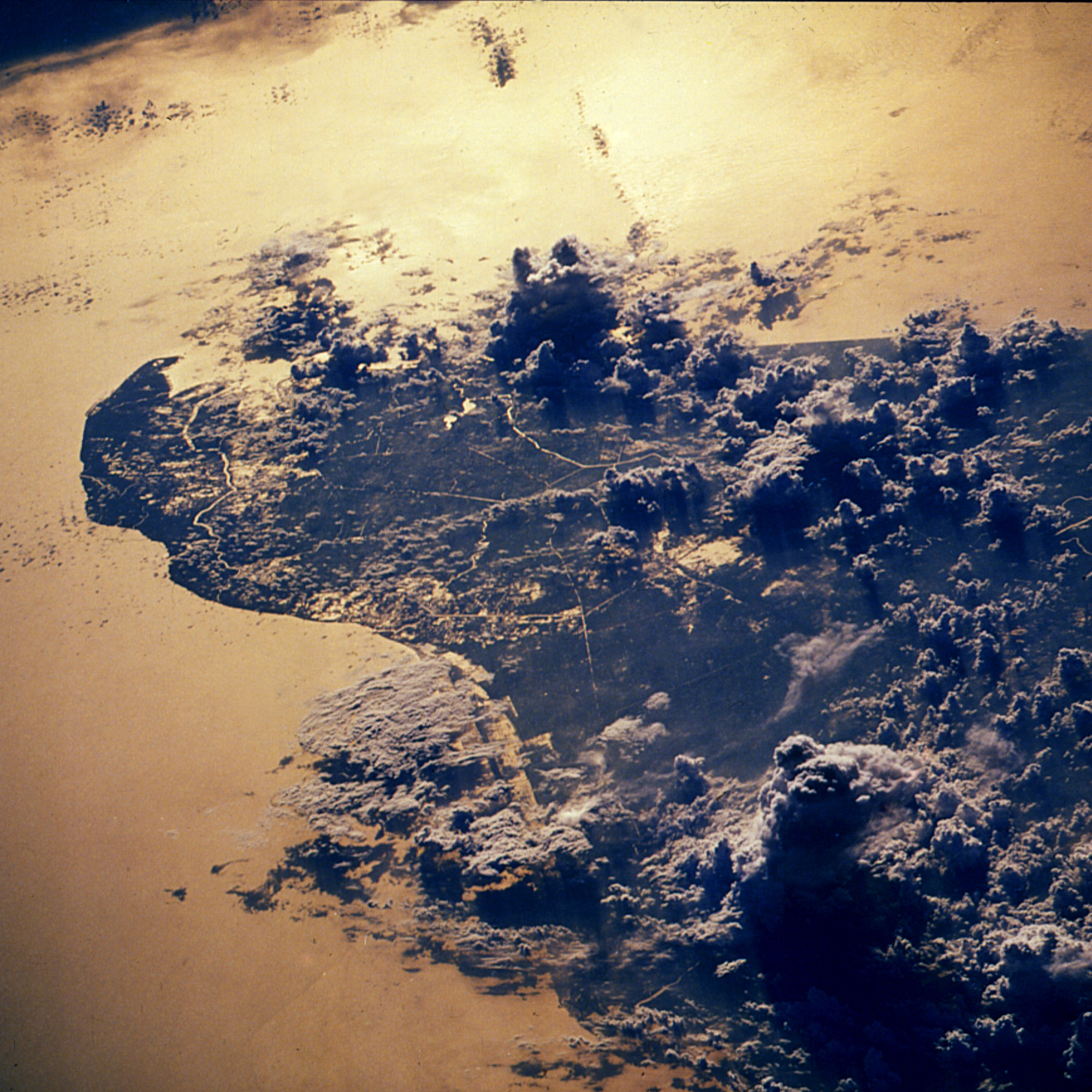
The Mekong River delta imaged from orbit.

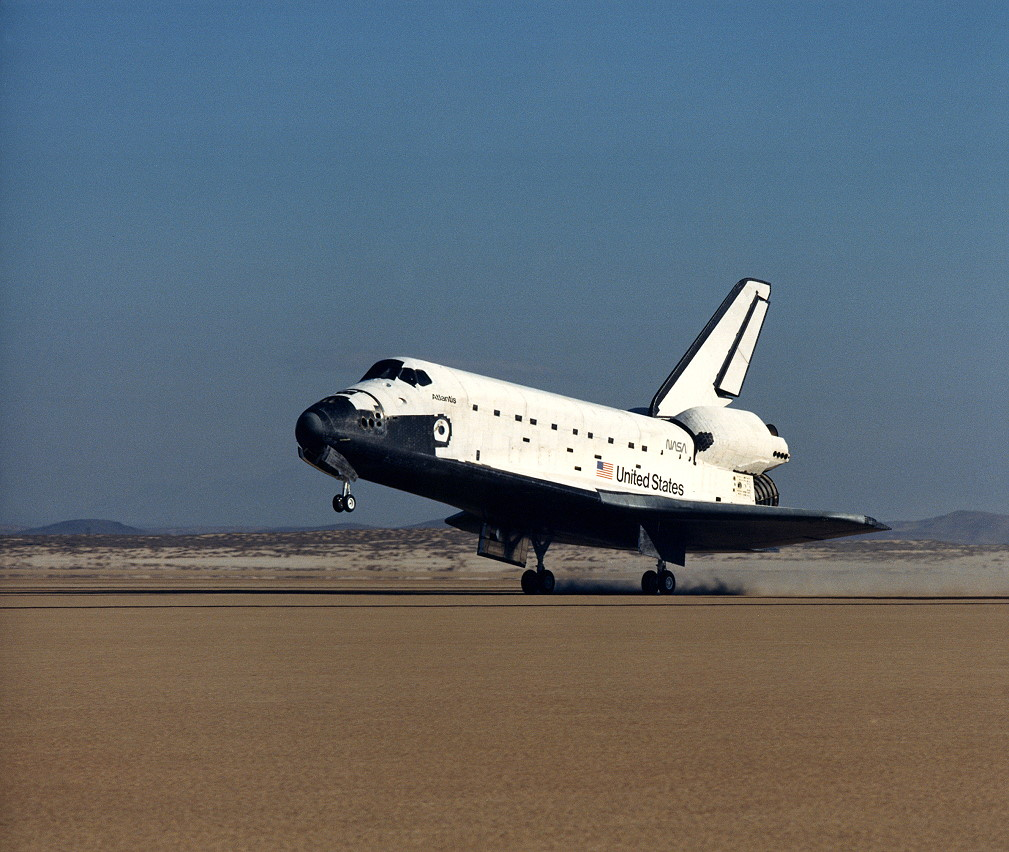
Atlantis lands at Edwards Air Force Base.

== See also ==
- List of human spaceflights
- List of Space Shuttle missions
