= Etalon (satellite) =

Etalon-1
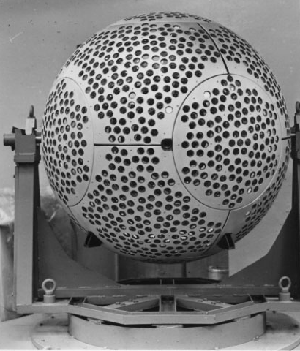
- Mission type: Geodesy
- COSPAR ID: 1989-001C
- SATCAT no.: 19751

Start of mission
- Launch date: 10 January 1989, 02:05 UTC
- Launch site: Baikonur Cosmodrome, Kazakhstan

Orbital parameters
- Reference system: Geocentric
- Regime: Medium Earth
- Eccentricity: 0.0021819
- Inclination: 64.1497 degrees
- Period: 675.56 minutes
- Epoch: 25 July 2018, 18:51:56 UTC

Etalon-2
- Mission type: Geodesy
- COSPAR ID: 1989-039C
- SATCAT no.: 20026

Start of mission
- Launch date: 31 May 1989, 08:31 UTC
- Launch site: Baikonur Cosmodrome, Kazakhstan

Orbital parameters
- Reference system: Geocentric
- Regime: Medium Earth
- Eccentricity: 0.0017121
- Inclination: 65.2335 degrees
- Period: 675.41 minutes
- Epoch: 25 July 2018, 18:59:47 UTC

Etalon-1 and Etalon-2 are geodetic satellites. They are designed to determine, with high accuracy, terrestrial reference frame and Earth rotation parameters, to improve the gravity field, and to improve the gravitational constant. Each satellite is a high-density passive laser reflector in a very stable medium Earth orbit (MEO).
