= Soyuz TM-9 =

1990 Soviet crewed spaceflight to Mir

- COSPAR ID: 1990-014A
- SATCAT no.: 20494
- Mission duration: 179 days, 1 hour, 17 minutes, 57 seconds
- Orbits completed: ~2,895

Spacecraft properties
- Spacecraft: Soyuz 7K-STM No. 60
- Spacecraft type: Soyuz-TM
- Manufacturer: NPO Energia
- Launch mass: 7,150 kilograms (15,760 lb)

Crew
- Crew size: 2
- Members: Anatoly Solovyev; Aleksandr Balandin
- Callsign: Родни́к (Rodnik- Spring)

Start of mission
- Launch date: 11 February 1990, 06:16:00 UTC
- Rocket: Soyuz-U2

End of mission
- Landing date: 9 August 1990, 07:33:57 UTC
- Landing site: 70 kilometres (43 mi) NE of Arkalyk - 50.85 N; 67.28 E

Orbital parameters
- Reference system: Geocentric
- Regime: Low Earth
- Perigee altitude: 373 kilometres (232 mi)
- Apogee altitude: 387 kilometres (240 mi)
- Inclination: 51.6 degrees
- Period: 92.2 minutes

Docking with Mir
- Docking date: 13 February 1990, 06:37:47 UTC
- Undocking date: 9 August 1990, 04:08:49 UTC
- Soyuz programme (Crewed missions)

Soyuz TM-9 was the ninth expedition to the Russian Space Station Mir.

== Crew ==
| Position | Crew |
|---|---|
| Commander | Anatoly Solovyev; Second spaceflight |
| Flight engineer | Aleksandr Balandin; Only spaceflight |

== Mission highlights ==
During docking, cosmonauts aboard Mir noticed that three of the eight thermal blankets (layers of foil vacuum-shield insulation) on the descent module of the approaching Soyuz-TM 9 spacecraft had come loose from their attachments near the heat shield, yet remained attached at their top ends. The main concern was that the capsule might cool down, permitting condensation to form inside and short out its electrical systems. There was also fear that the blankets might block the infrared vertical sensor, which oriented the module for reentry.

Three other areas of concern emerged: that the explosive bolts binding the service module to the descent module might fail to work after direct exposure to space, that the heat shield might be compromised by direct space exposure, and that an EVA to repair the blankets might cause additional damage. Consideration was given to flying Soyuz TM-10 with one cosmonaut aboard as a rescue mission. During an EVA, the cosmonauts folded back two of the three blankets and left the third alone. During reentry, the cosmonauts ejected both the orbital module and the service module simultaneously in an effort to minimize the chances that a blanket could snag. Normally the orbital module went first. The descent module suffered no damage as a result of its prolonged exposure to space conditions. Reentry occurred as normal.
