= List of spacewalks and moonwalks 1965–1999 =

This list contains all spacewalks and moonwalks performed from 1965 to 1999 where an astronaut has fully or partially left a spacecraft. Entries for moonwalks are shown with a gray background while entries for all other EVAs are uncolored.

All spacewalks have had the astronauts tethered to their spacecraft except for seven spacewalks by the United States (six in 1984 using the Manned Maneuvering Unit, and one in 1994 testing the SAFER rescue device). All moonwalks were performed with astronauts untethered, and some of the astronauts traveled far enough to lose visual contact with their craft (they were up to 7.6 km away from it using the Lunar Roving Vehicle). One lunar EVA was not a moonwalk, but rather a stand-up EVA partially out the top hatch of the LM, where it was thought that the extra height would help with surveying the area prior to conducting the moonwalks. Only three deep-space EVAs have ever been conducted, where the activity was neither on the lunar surface nor in low Earth orbit, but far away from both the Moon and the Earth.

== 1965–1969 spacewalks and moonwalks ==
Spacewalk beginning and ending times are given in Coordinated Universal Time (UTC).

#	Spacecraft	Spacewalkers	Start (UTC)	End (UTC)	Duration
1.	Voskhod 2	(Soviet Union) Alexei Leonov	18 March 1965; 08:34:51	18 March 1965; 08:47:00	0 h 12 min
1.	Voskhod 2	Leonov conducted the first EVA in history. Leonov had difficulty fitting back into the spacecraft due to spacesuit stiffness in vacuum, and vented air from his spacesuit in order to bend back into the capsule.			
2.	Gemini 4	(United States) Ed White (United States) James A. McDivitt (did not exit)	3 June 1965; 19:46:00	3 June 1965; 20:06:00	0 h 20 min
2.	Gemini 4	White conducted the second EVA in history and the first American EVA. White also had difficulty returning to the Gemini spacecraft. Although he was very fit and athletic, the effort left him exhausted. While McDivitt did not exit, he was exposed to the vacuum of space in the spacecraft. White spent 20 minutes outside the capsule, the capsule's hatch was open for 36 minutes and the capsule was depressurized for 46 minutes.			
3.	Gemini 9A	(United States) Eugene Cernan (United States) Thomas P. Stafford (did not exit)	5 June 1966; 15:02:00	5 June 1966; 17:09:00	2 h 7 min
3.	Gemini 9A	A complex work EVA was planned for Cernan, which involved him moving to the rear of the Gemini spacecraft and donning the Astronaut propulsion unit, developed by the U.S. Air Force. Cernan expended four to five times the expected effort, raising his pulse as high as 180 beats per minute. Excess heat and respiration completely fogged Cernan's visor, and the EVA was cut short. Cernan also had difficulty returning to the spacecraft and closing the hatch.			
4.	Gemini 10; EVA 1	(United States) Michael Collins (United States) John Young (did not exit)	19 July 1966; 21:44:00	19 July 1966; 22:33:00	0 h 49 min
4.	Gemini 10; EVA 1	Collins performed a stand-up EVA. Instead of climbing completely out of the spacecraft, Collins extended his torso outside the spacecraft to take photos before and after capsule sunrise. Color photography after sunrise was only partly completed due to severe eye irritation of both Collins and Command Pilot Young. Handling the camera proved difficult due to the stiffness of Collins' gloves.			
5.	Gemini 10; EVA 2	(United States) Michael Collins (United States) John Young (did not exit)	20 July 1966; 23:01:00	20 July 1966; 23:40:00	0 h 39 min
5.	Gemini 10; EVA 2	Collins performed an umbilical EVA. With more difficulty than expected, Collins collected the micrometeorite collection package from the exterior of the Gemini spacecraft. Then, using the Hand Held Maneuvering Unit, he pushed to the nearby Agena Target Vehicle to collect its micrometeorite collection package. Collins then pulled on the umbilical cord to return and re-enter the spacecraft.			
6.	Gemini 11; EVA 1	(United States) Richard Gordon (United States) Pete Conrad (did not exit)	13 September 1966; 14:44:00	13 September 1966; 15:17:00	0 h 33 min
6.	Gemini 11; EVA 1	Gordon attached a tether between the Gemini and Agena Target Vehicle for later orbital mechanics testing. While making the attachment, his workload exceeded the capacity of the spacesuit cooling system, and his vision became obscured by a fogged visor and sweat in his eyes. Planned activities were curtailed by Command Pilot Conrad and Gordon returned to the spacecraft.			
7.	Gemini 11; EVA 2	(United States) Richard Gordon (United States) Pete Conrad (did not exit)	14 September 1966; 12:49:00	14 September 1966; 14:57:00	2 h 08 min
7.	Gemini 11; EVA 2	Gordon performed a stand-up EVA, extending through the hatch to take astronomical photos. Conrad reported the spacewalk was so relaxing they both fell asleep for a moment after sunrise.			
8.	Gemini 12; EVA 1	(United States) Buzz Aldrin (United States) Jim Lovell (did not exit)	12 November 1966; 16:15:00	12 November 1966; 18:44:00	2 h 29 min
8.	Gemini 12; EVA 1	Aldrin performed a stand-up EVA. Aldrin took UV still photos and 16 mm color movie pictures, collected external experimental samples, and conducted a light exercise routine.			
9.	Gemini 12; EVA 2	(United States) Buzz Aldrin (United States) Jim Lovell (did not exit)	13 November 1966; 15:34:00	13 November 1966; 17:40:00	2 h 06 min
9.	Gemini 12; EVA 2	Aldrin's walk was the first completely successful umbilical EVA, with all objectives achieved. He was able to control his movements and restrict his workload using techniques developed using underwater zero gravity simulations. Aldrin also benefited from the experiences of the previous American EVAs. Aldrin was able to move around the outside of the craft, deploy and recover various experimental packages, install and remove cameras, and practice work techniques using a ratchet-type wrench.			
10.	Gemini 12; EVA 3	(United States) Buzz Aldrin (United States) Jim Lovell (did not exit)	14 November 1966; 14:52:00	14 November 1966; 15:47:00	0 h 55 min
10.	Gemini 12; EVA 3	Aldrin performed another stand-up EVA. Aldrin again extended outside the hatch to take photographs and repeat the light exercise experiment. Exertion levels during exercise were comparable to preflight simulations. Equipment and waste food containers not needed for re-entry were jettisoned from the spacecraft.			
11.	Soyuz 4 & Soyuz 5	(Soviet Union) Yevgeny Khrunov (Soviet Union) Aleksei Yeliseyev	16 January 1969; 12:43:00	16 January 1969; 13:15:00	0 h 32 min
11.	Soyuz 4 & Soyuz 5	Khrunov and Yeliseyev conducted the first two-man spacewalk. Both cosmonauts launched in Soyuz 5, which then docked with Soyuz 4. Khrunov and Yeliseyev performed an EVA to transfer to Soyuz 4. Although docked together, Soyuz 4 and Soyuz 5 did not make an internal connection, necessitating the EVA. Khrunov and Yeliseyev returned to Earth aboard Soyuz 4.			
12.	Apollo 9	(United States) Rusty Schweickart (United States) David Scott (stand up only) (United States) James McDivitt (did not exit)	6 March 1969; 16:45:00	6 March 1969; 18:02:00	1 h 17 min
12.	Apollo 9	Schweickart exited the lunar module hatch, wearing the portable life support system (PLSS) backpack. Schweickart's backpack provided oxygen, communications, and cooling, independent of his spacecraft. Scott extended out of the command module hatch but remained supported by the command module through an umbilical cord. Plans for Schweickart to move to the command module hatch were scrubbed due to severe space sickness he had suffered the day before.			
13.	Apollo 11 only moonwalk	(United States) Neil Armstrong (United States) Buzz Aldrin	21 July 1969; 02:39:33	21 July 1969; 05:11:13	2 h 31 min 40 s
13.	Apollo 11 only moonwalk	Armstrong became the first man to walk on the Moon. Aldrin followed, describing the Moon as "magnificent desolation". During their 2½ hour EVA, the team deployed the Early Apollo Scientific Experimental Package, took a call from President Nixon, collected rock and core samples, raised a US Flag, and took photographs. Armstrong reported moving around on the Moon was easier than the simulation.			
14.	Apollo 12 first moonwalk	(United States) Pete Conrad (United States) Alan Bean	19 November 1969; 11:32:35	19 November 1969; 15:28:38	3 h 56 min 03 s
14.	Apollo 12 first moonwalk	During the first Apollo 12 moonwalk, Conrad and Bean deployed the modular equipment stowage assembly, collected and stowed the contingency sample, erected the solar wind foil, collected core samples and more surface samples, and deployed the Apollo Lunar Surface Experiments Package. Early in the moonwalk, Bean accidentally pointed the color TV camera toward the Sun and destroyed the camera. Communication to the ground for the remainder of their moonwalks became radio-only. The two were surprised to find photocopies of Playboy Playmate pictures inserted into some pages of their cuff checklist, a prank done by their backup crew.			
15.	Apollo 12 second moonwalk	(United States) Pete Conrad (United States) Alan Bean	20 November 1969; 03:54:45	20 November 1969; 07:44:00	3 h 49 min 15 s
15.	Apollo 12 second moonwalk	Conrad and Bean collected additional core and rock samples and traveled over 600 feet (180 m) to Surveyor 3 to collect some parts (including the TV camera) off the robotic lander. They also retrieved the solar wind foil deployed on their earlier moonwalk.			

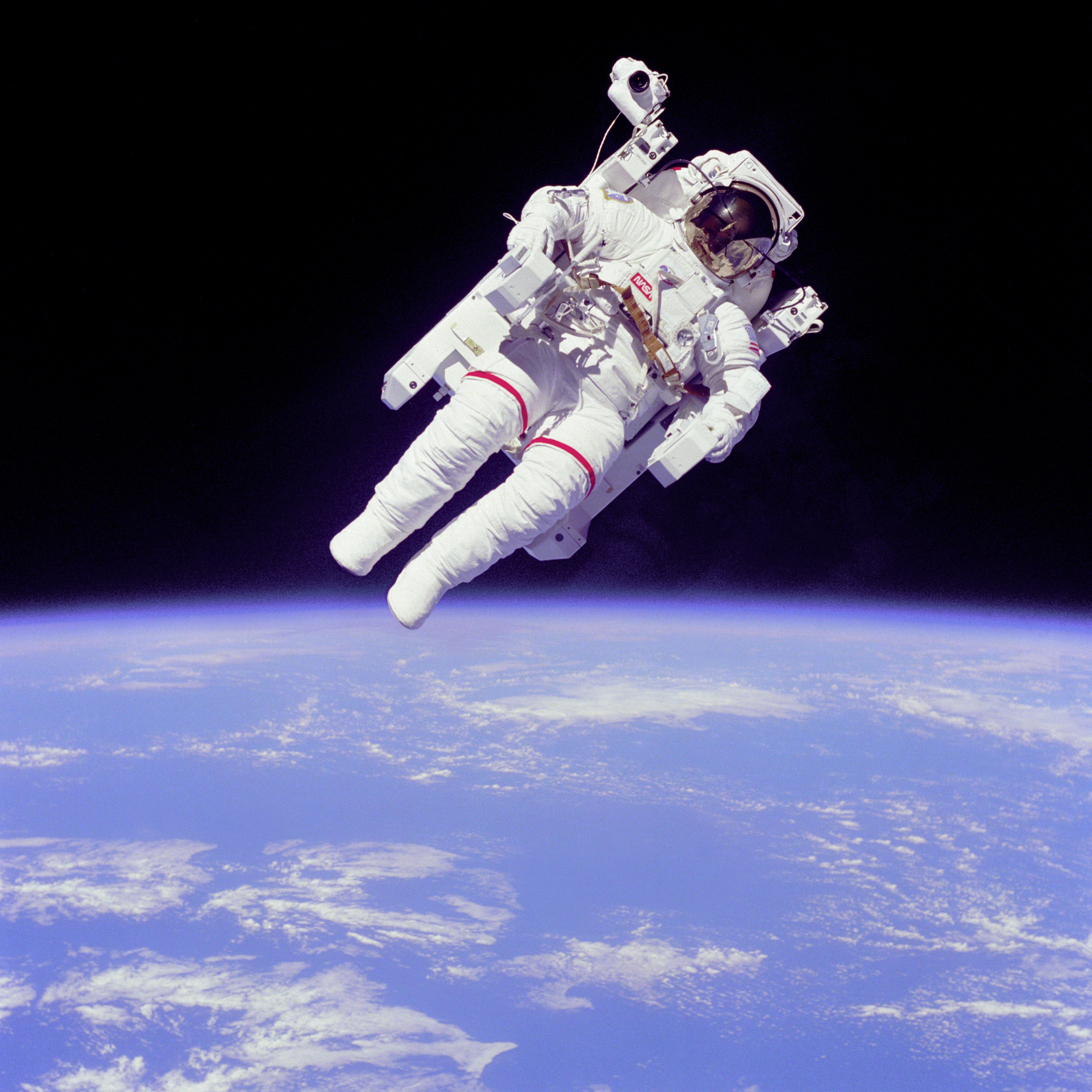
Bruce McCandless conducts the first untethered spacewalk during STS-41-B.

== 1970–1979 spacewalks and moonwalks ==
Spacewalk beginning and ending times are given in Coordinated Universal Time (UTC).

#	Spacecraft	Spacewalkers	Start (UTC)	End (UTC)	Duration
16.	Apollo 14 first moonwalk	(United States) Alan Shepard (United States) Edgar Mitchell	5 February 1971; 14:42:13	5 February 1971; 19:30:03	4 h 47 min 50 s
16.	Apollo 14 first moonwalk	Shepard and Mitchell deployed the modular equipment stowage assembly, grabbed a contingency sample, and successfully set up the color TV camera. They erected an American flag and the solar wind foil. They then deployed the ALSEP and proceeded to collect core samples and several large Moon rocks.			
17.	Apollo 14 second moonwalk	(United States) Alan Shepard (United States) Edgar Mitchell	6 February 1971; 08:11:15	6 February 1971; 12:45:56	4 h 34 min 41 s
17.	Apollo 14 second moonwalk	Shepard and Mitchell trekked 1300 meters (almost a mile) up the side of Cone crater, collecting rock samples, taking photographs and deploying a portable magnetometer. Although they came close, the team did not find the rim of the crater due to the difficulty of navigating the stark lunarscape. Before re-entering the Apollo Lunar Module, Shepard used a modified sample tool to hit a couple of golf balls.			
18.	Apollo 15 moon survey EVA	(United States) David Scott (stand up only) (United States) James Irwin (did not exit)	31 July 1971; 00:16:49	31 July 1971; 00:49:56	33 min 07 s
18.	Apollo 15 moon survey EVA	Scott stood in the top hatch of the lunar module, visually surveying and photographing the landing site. He identified future EVA destinations and confirmed suitability for Lunar Roving Vehicle access.			
19.	Apollo 15 first moonwalk	(United States) David Scott (United States) James Irwin	31 July 1971; 13:12:17	31 July 1971; 19:45:59	6 h 32 min 42 s
19.	Apollo 15 first moonwalk	Scott and Irwin were the first team to ride the Lunar Roving Vehicle on the Moon. After securing the contingency sample, they drove the Rover (equipped with a TV camera beaming video back to Houston) to Elbow Crater and then to St. George Crater, collecting rock samples and taking photographs on the 5.6-mile (9.0 km) trip. On return to the lunar module, the moonwalkers deployed the ALSEP.			
20.	Apollo 15 second moonwalk	(United States) David Scott (United States) James Irwin	1 August 1971; 11:48:48	1 August 1971; 19:01:02	7 h 12 min 14 s
20.	Apollo 15 second moonwalk	Scott and Irwin traveled a southbound loop of 6.8 miles (10.9 km) in the Lunar Rover, collecting rock and soil samples, photographs, and a core sample. They stopped at the Apennine front, Spur Crater, and Dune Crater. At the Spur Crater rim Scott and Irwin spotted and collected a white rock later estimated to be 4.5 billion years old. Almost as old as the Moon itself, sample 15415 has become known as Genesis Rock, the oldest rock recovered during the Apollo missions. After returning to the lunar module, they completed work around the ALSEP before re-entering the LM.			
21.	Apollo 15 third moonwalk	(United States) David Scott (United States) James Irwin	2 August 1971; 08:52:14	2 August 1971; 13:42:04	4 h 49 min 50 s
21.	Apollo 15 third moonwalk	The spacewalkers' last Lunar Rover ride traveled 2.8 miles (4.5 km) westward toward Hadley Rille. Sample collections and photographs were taken at Scarp Crater, Rim Crater, and The Terrace on the rim of the Hadley Rille. Returning to the lunar module, Scott and Irwin collected the long core sample from the area of the ALSEP.			
22.	Apollo 15 trans-earth EVA	(United States) Alfred Worden (United States) James Irwin (stand up only) (United States) David Scott (did not exit)	5 August 1971; 15:31:12	5 August 1971; 16:10:19	39 min 07 s
22.	Apollo 15 trans-earth EVA	First deep space EVA. Worden made three trips to the scientific instrument module (SIM) on the service module to recover the film cassettes from the panoramic and mapping cameras and to examine the SIM for anomalies. Irwin stood in the hatch to assist and photograph the spacewalk.			
23.	Apollo 16 first moonwalk	(United States) John Young (United States) Charles Duke	21 April 1972; 16:47:28	21 April 1972; 23:58:40	7 h 11 min 02 s
23.	Apollo 16 first moonwalk	Young and Duke deployed the ALSEP. Then the moonwalkers boarded the Lunar Roving Vehicle and traveled to Flag, Spook, and Buster Craters to collect rock and soil samples and to take photographs. At Buster Crater the lunar portable magnetometer was deployed.			
24.	Apollo 16 second moonwalk	(United States) John Young (United States) Charles Duke	22 April 1972; 16:33:35	22 April 1972; 23:56:44	7 h 23 min 09 s
24.	Apollo 16 second moonwalk	Astronauts Young and Duke traveled to the slopes of Stone Mountain, stopping at nine sites to collect samples, take photographs, and deploy a lunar portable magnetometer. The round trip on the Lunar Roving Vehicle totaled 7.2 miles (11.6 km).			
25.	Apollo 16 third moonwalk	(United States) John Young (United States) Charles Duke	23 April 1972; 15:25:28	23 April 1972; 21:05:31	5 h 40 min 03 s
25.	Apollo 16 third moonwalk	Young and Duke climbed back onto the Lunar Roving Vehicle and traveled to Palmetto and End Crater, finally reaching the rim of North Ray Crater. At the North Ray rim, they left to the LM and walked to the largest boulder (dubbed House Rock) sampled by the Apollo missions. Young and Duke set the lunar land speed record of 10.5 miles per hour (16.9 km/h) during the third EVA.			
26.	Apollo 16 trans-earth EVA	(United States) Thomas Mattingly (United States) Charles Duke (stand up only) (United States) John Young (did not exit)	25 April 1972; 20:33:46	25 April 1972; 21:57:28	1 h 23 min 42 s
26.	Apollo 16 trans-earth EVA	Command Module Pilot Mattingly retrieved the panoramic and mapping camera film cassettes from the SIM bay. Lunar Module Pilot Duke stood in the hatch to support Mattingly and to operate the microbial ecology evaluation device.			
27.	Apollo 17 first moonwalk	(United States) Eugene Cernan (United States) Harrison Schmitt	11 December 1972; 23:54:49	12 December 1972; 07:06:42	7 h 11 min 53 s
27.	Apollo 17 first moonwalk	Cernan and Schmitt deployed the ALSEP. Due to time restraints, their first trip on the Lunar Rover had to be shortened to a single stop near Emory Crater. This first EVA trip looped 2.2 miles (3.5 km) to collect about 31 pounds (14 kg) of geological samples.			
28.	Apollo 17 second moonwalk	(United States) Eugene Cernan (United States) Harrison Schmitt	12 December 1972; 23:28:06	13 December 1972; 07:05:02	7 h 36 min 56 s
28.	Apollo 17 second moonwalk	Cernan and Schmitt rode almost 5 miles (8.0 km) in the Lunar Roving Vehicle toward the South Massif, stopping at Hole-in-the-Wall and Ballet Crater to collect samples. At Shorty Crater, Schmitt discovered orange-colored soil.			
29.	Apollo 17 third moonwalk	(United States) Eugene Cernan (United States) Harrison Schmitt	13 December 1972; 22:25:48	14 December 1972; 05:40:56	7 h 15 min 08 s
29.	Apollo 17 third moonwalk	On their last moonwalk, Cernan and Schmitt drove the Lunar Rover toward the North Massif. They explored a large split boulder called Tracy's Rock, (named for Cernan's daughter) taking samples, making photographs, and providing oral descriptions of the area. The moonwalkers also visited the Sculptured Hills and Van Serg Crater as they finished their 7.5 miles (12.1 km) final ride. Cernan is the last person to date to walk on the lunar surface.			
30.	Apollo 17 trans-earth EVA	(United States) Ronald Evans (United States) Harrison Schmitt (stand up only) (United States) Eugene Cernan (did not exit)	17 December 1972; 20:27:40	17 December 1972; 21:33:24	1 h 05 min 44 s
30.	Apollo 17 trans-earth EVA	Last deep space EVA in history. No problems were encountered as Evans recovered the panoramic and mapping film cassettes and the lunar sounder tape from the SIM bay on the service module, and handed them to Schmitt in the command module hatch.			
31.	Skylab 2 EVA 1	(United States) Paul J. Weitz (stand up only) (United States) Joseph Kerwin (did not exit) (United States) Pete Conrad (did not exit)	26 May 1973; 00:40	26 May 1973; 01:20	40 min
31.	Skylab 2 EVA 1	Using a 10-foot (3.0 m) long tool, Pilot Weitz stood in the open side hatch of the command module (as Science Pilot Joseph Kerwin held onto his legs) and tried to remove a strap preventing the release of a solar array wing on Skylab.			
32.	Skylab 2 EVA 2	(United States) Pete Conrad (United States) Joseph Kerwin	7 June 1973; 15:15	7 June 1973; 18:40	3 h 25 min
32.	Skylab 2 EVA 2	Conrad and Kerwin used long-handled cable cutters to remove debris that prevented the remaining solar array wing from deploying (the other was sheared off from the station during its launch). They then forced the solar wing to deploy, providing Skylab with the electrical power needed to operate.			
33.	Skylab 2 EVA 3	(United States) Pete Conrad (United States) Paul Weitz	19 June 1973; 10:55	19 June 1973; 12:31	1 h 36 min
33.	Skylab 2 EVA 3	Conrad and Weitz ventured outside the station to replace exposed film cassettes in the Apollo Telescope Mount with fresh film. Conrad also fixed an electrical relay by whacking it with a hammer.			
34.	Skylab 3 EVA 1	(United States) Owen Garriott (United States) Jack Lousma	6 August 1973; 17:30	7 August 1973; 00:01	6 h 31 min
34.	Skylab 3 EVA 1	Garriot and Lousma erected a twin-pole solar shield to improve temperature control in Skylab. They also replaced film cassettes in the Apollo Telescope Mount solar observatory and installed micrometeoroid detection panels.			
35.	Skylab 3 EVA 2	(United States) Owen Garriott (United States) Jack Lousma	24 August 1973; 16:24	24 August 1973; 20:55	4 h 31 min
35.	Skylab 3 EVA 2	Garriott and Lousma disconnected external cabling, installed a new gyroscope selection box, and reconnected the cabling to the box. They also replaced the film in the solar observatory.			
36.	Skylab 3 EVA 3	(United States) Owen Garriott (United States) Alan Bean	22 September 1973; 11:18	22 September 1973; 13:59	2 h 41 min
36.	Skylab 3 EVA 3	Garriott and Bean replaced the film in the solar observatory. They also collected the Thermal Coatings Experiment Panel for return to Earth.			
37.	Skylab 4 EVA 1	(United States) Edward Gibson (United States) William Pogue	22 November 1973; 17:42	23 November 1973; 00:15	6 h 33 min
37.	Skylab 4 EVA 1	Gibson and Pogue spent 6½ hours on their first EVA replacing the film on the solar observatory and repairing the antenna for the Earth Resources Experiment Package.			
38.	Skylab 4 EVA 2	(United States) Gerald Carr (United States) William Pogue	25 December 1973; 16:00	25 December 1973; 23:01	7 h 01 min
38.	Skylab 4 EVA 2	Carr and Pogue used the extreme ultraviolet electronographic camera and the coronagraph contamination camera to photograph Comet Kohoutek. They also replaced the film in the solar observatory.			
39.	Skylab 4 EVA 3	(United States) Gerald Carr (United States) Edward Gibson	29 December 1973; 17:00	29 December 1973; 20:29	3 h 29 min
39.	Skylab 4 EVA 3	Carr and Gibson photographed Comet Kohoutek as it appeared from behind the Sun. They also recovered the Thermal Control Coatings Experiment panel.			
40.	Skylab 4 EVA 4	(United States) Gerald Carr (United States) Edward Gibson	3 February 1974; 15:19	3 February 1974; 20:38	5 h 19 min
40.	Skylab 4 EVA 4	Carr and Gibson retrieved film from the solar observatory for the last time. They also photographed Kohoutek using the electronographic camera.			
41.	Salyut 6 PE-1	(Soviet Union) Yuri Romanenko (stand up only) (Soviet Union) Georgi Grechko	19 December 1977; 21:36	19 December 1977; 23:04	1 h 28 min
41.	Salyut 6 PE-1	The EVA by Romanenko and Grechko was the first Soviet EVA in over eight years and the first use of the Orlan-D spacesuit. Grechko inspected the front docking port for damage from the failed Soyuz 25 docking and found no damage. Romanenko, assisting Grechko from the hatch, pushed away from the station without a secure line, and was rescued by Grechko.			
42.	Salyut 6 PE-2	(Soviet Union) Vladimir Kovalyonok (stand up only) (Soviet Union) Aleksandr Ivanchenkov	29 July 1978; 04:00	29 July 1978; 06:20	2 h 05 min
42.	Salyut 6 PE-2	Ivanchenkov retrieved samples and experiments attached to the outside of Salyut 6. Kovalyonok assisted with the retrievals and used a color television camera to transmit EVA images to TsUP.			
43.	Salyut 6 PE-3	(Soviet Union) Valery Ryumin (Soviet Union) Vladimir Lyakhov	15 August 1979; 14:16	15 August 1979; 15:39	1 h 23 min
43.	Salyut 6 PE-3	Ryumin and Lyakhov removed the KRT-10 antenna that had failed to separate from Salyut 6 and had obstructed the station's aft docking port target. After disposing of the antenna, Ryumin collected samples of damaged insulation and a retrieved a micrometeoroid detector.			

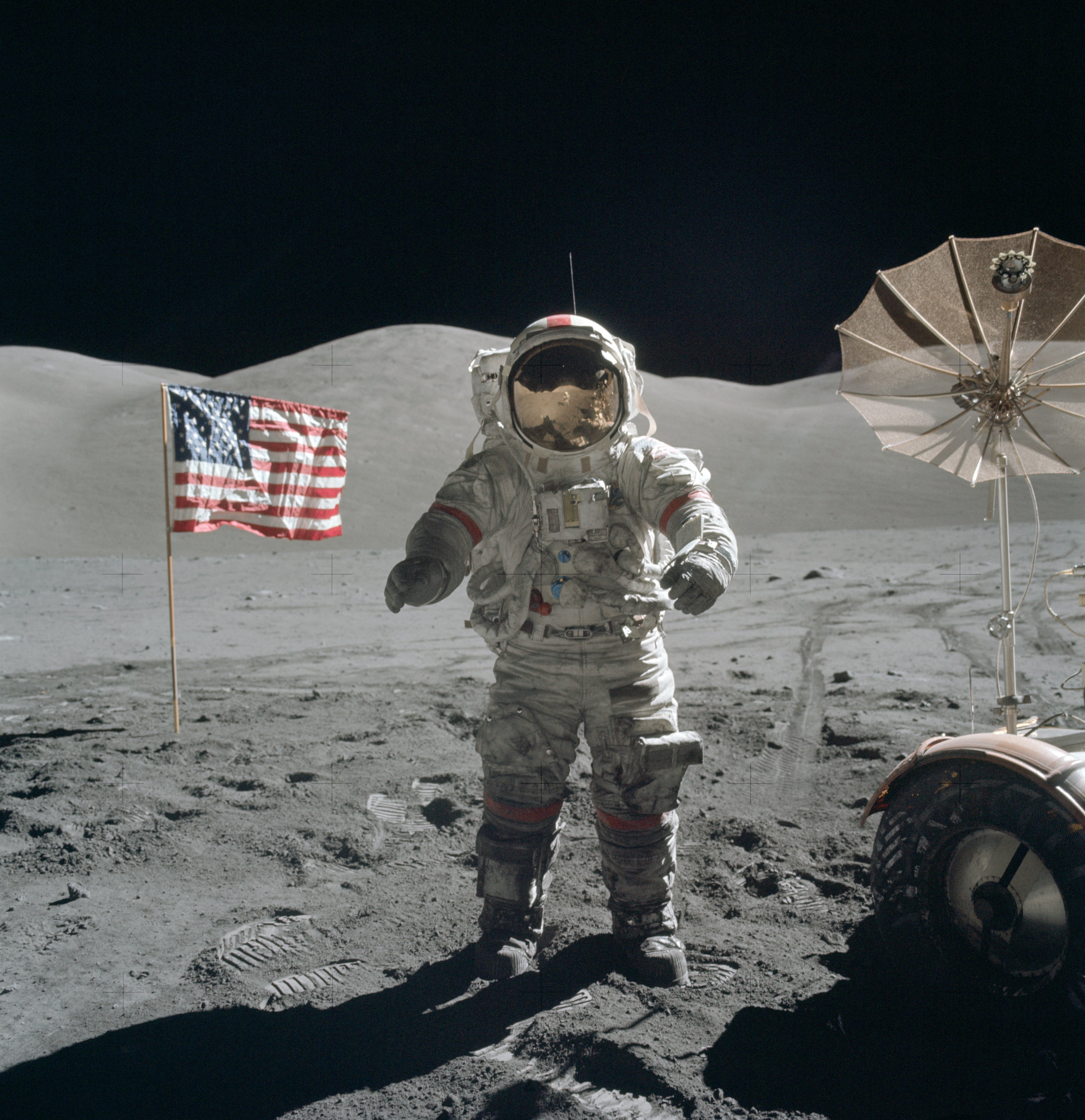
The last man on the Moon, Eugene Cernan, in a photo taken by Harrison Schmitt on the third (and last) of the Apollo 17 moonwalks. Schmitt's reflection can be seen in the center of Cernan's helmet.

== 1980–1984 spacewalks ==
Spacewalk beginning and ending times are given in Coordinated Universal Time (UTC).

#	Spacecraft	Spacewalkers	Start (UTC)	End (UTC)	Duration
44.	Salyut 7 – PE-1	(Soviet Union) Anatoli Berezovoy (stand up only) (Soviet Union) Valentin Lebedev	July 30, 1982; 02:39	July 30, 1982; 05:12	2 h 33 min
44.	Salyut 7 – PE-1	Performing the first EVA from Salyut 7, Lebedev anchored himself with a foot restraint, while Berezovoy assisted from the hatch. After collecting and placing samples on the exterior surface of the spacecraft, Lebedev tested methods for assembly and disassembly work in space, including the Istok panel experiment of turning bolts with a special wrench.			
45.	STS-6 – EVA 1	(United States) Story Musgrave (United States) Donald Peterson	April 7, 1983; 21:05	April 8, 1983; 01:15	4 h 10 min
45.	STS-6 – EVA 1	Musgrave and Peterson conducted the first spacewalk from a Space Shuttle. They spent their time testing their spacesuits and tools for future space construction.			
46.	Salyut 7 PE-2 – EVA 1	(Soviet Union) Vladimir Lyakhov (Soviet Union) Aleksandr Pavlovich Aleksandrov	November 1, 1983; 04:47	November 1, 1983; 07:36	2 h 50 min
46.	Salyut 7 PE-2 – EVA 1	Lyakhov and Aleksandrov added a new solar panel to Salyut 7, using techniques tested in an earlier EVA by Lebedev.			
47.	Salyut 7 PE-2 – EVA 2	(Soviet Union) Vladimir Lyakhov (Soviet Union) Aleksandr Aleksandrov	3 November 1983; 03:47	3 November 1983; 06:42	2 h 55 min
47.	Salyut 7 PE-2 – EVA 2	Lyakhov and Aleksandrov added a second solar panel, raising the electrical output of Salyut 7 by 50%.			
48.	STS-41-B; EVA 1	(United States) Bruce McCandless II (United States) Robert Stewart	February 7, 1984; 12:10	February 7, 1984; 18:05	5 h 55 min
48.	STS-41-B; EVA 1	McCandless and Stewart rode on the Manned Maneuvering Unit (MMU) during the first untethered EVAs in history. Both astronauts practiced using tools and procedures for the planned capture and repair of the Solar Maximum Mission (SMM) satellite to be performed in a subsequent flight.			
49.	STS-41-B; EVA 2	(United States) Bruce McCandless (United States) Robert Stewart	9 February 1984; 10:24	9 February 1984; 16:41	6 h 17 min
49.	STS-41-B; EVA 2	McCandless and Stewart continued testing the MMUs. They also continued practice with tools and procedures to be used with recovery and repair of the SMM satellite.			
50.	STS-41-C; EVA 1	(United States) George Nelson (United States) James van Hoften	April 8, 1984; 14:18	April 8, 1984; 16:56	2 h 38 min
50.	STS-41-C; EVA 1	Nelson rode the MMU to the SMM satellite. Van Hoften stood by in the payload bay to provide any needed assistance. After three unsuccessful attempts to capture the SMM with the Trunnion Pin Acquisition Device (TPAD) tool and one attempt to grab the satellite by hand, the spacewalkers returned to Challenger. The SMM was recovered the next day with the RMS.			
51.	STS-41-C; EVA 2	(United States) George Nelson (United States) James van Hoften	11 April 1984; 08:58	11 April 1984; 15:42	6 h 44 min
51.	STS-41-C; EVA 2	Nelson and Van Hoften completed repair of the SMM satellite and then continued testing of the MMU.			
52.	Salyut 7 PE-3 – EVA 1	(Soviet Union) Leonid Kizim (Soviet Union) Vladimir Solovyov	April 23, 1984; 04:31	April 23, 1984; 08:46	4 h 20 min
52.	Salyut 7 PE-3 – EVA 1	Kizim and Solovyov conducted the first of five EVAs to repair the ruptured main oxidizer line on Salyut 7. They installed a new ladder to reach the damaged line.			
53.	Salyut 7 PE-3 – EVA 2	(Soviet Union) Leonid Kizim (Soviet Union) Vladimir Solovyov	April 26, 1984; 02:40	April 26, 1984; 07:40	4 h 56 min
53.	Salyut 7 PE-3 – EVA 2	During the second of five EVAs to repair the ruptured oxidizer pipe, Kizim and Solovyov removed insulation and installed a valve in the spare line.			
54.	Salyut 7 PE-3 – EVA 3	(Soviet Union) Leonid Kizim (Soviet Union) Vladimir Solovyov	29 April 1984; 01:35	29 April 1984; 04:20	2 h 45 min
54.	Salyut 7 PE-3 – EVA 3	For the third of five EVAs to repair the damaged oxidizer line, Kizim and Solovyov installed a bypass line around the damaged section.			
55.	Salyut 7 PE-3 – EVA 4	(Soviet Union) Leonid Kizim (Soviet Union) Vladimir Solovyov	May 3, 1984; 23:15	May 4, 1984; 02:00	2 h 45 min
55.	Salyut 7 PE-3 – EVA 4	Kizim and Solovyov completed the fourth of the five oxidizer line repair EVAs by installing a second bypass line and replacing the thermal insulation.			
56.	Salyut 7 PE-3 – EVA 5	(Soviet Union) Leonid Kizim (Soviet Union) Vladimir Solovyov	May 18, 1984; 17:52	May 18, 1984; 20:57	3 h 05 min
56.	Salyut 7 PE-3 – EVA 5	Overcoming a broken winch handle, Kizim and Solovyov added another set of two solar arrays to Salyut 7.			
57.	Salyut 7 VE-4 – EVA 1	(Soviet Union) Svetlana Savitskaya (Soviet Union) Vladimir Dzhanibekov	July 25, 1984; 14:55	July 25, 1984; 18:29	3 h 35 min
57.	Salyut 7 VE-4 – EVA 1	Savitskaya and Dzhanibekov tested the URI multi-purpose tool with several metal samples. Savitskaya became the first woman in history to perform an EVA.			
58.	Salyut 7 PE-3 – EVA 6	(Soviet Union) Leonid Kizim (Soviet Union) Vladimir Solovyov	August 8, 1984; 08:46	August 8, 1984; 13:46	5 h 00 min
58.	Salyut 7 PE-3 – EVA 6	Kizim and Solovyov completed the last of five EVAs to repair the ruptured oxidizer line. They used a pneumatic press tool carried up by Soyuz T-12 to crimp the ends of the ruptured pipe.			
59.	STS-41-G; EVA 1	(United States) David Leestma (United States) Kathryn D. Sullivan	October 11, 1984; 15:38	October 11, 1984; 19:05	3 h 29 min
59.	STS-41-G; EVA 1	Leestma and Sullivan demonstrated the use of the Orbital Refueling System, including the installation of an ORS valve maintenance kit. Sullivan became the first American woman to perform a spacewalk.			
60.	STS-51-A; EVA 1	(United States) Joseph P. Allen (United States) Dale Gardner	November 12, 1984; 13:25	November 12, 1984; 19:25	6 h 00 min
60.	STS-51-A; EVA 1	Allen rode the MMU to the Palapa B-2 satellite, and retrieved it into the payload bay of Discovery. Gardner and Allen secured the satellite in the payload bay for return to Earth.			
61.	STS-51-A; EVA 2	(United States) Joseph Allen (United States) Dale Gardner	November 14, 1984; 11:09	November 14, 1984; 16:51	5 h 42 min
61.	STS-51-A; EVA 2	In a procedure similar to the first EVA of STS-51-A, Gardner rode the MMU to the Westar VI satellite, and retrieved it into the payload bay. Allen and Gardner then secured the satellite in the payload bay for return to Earth.			

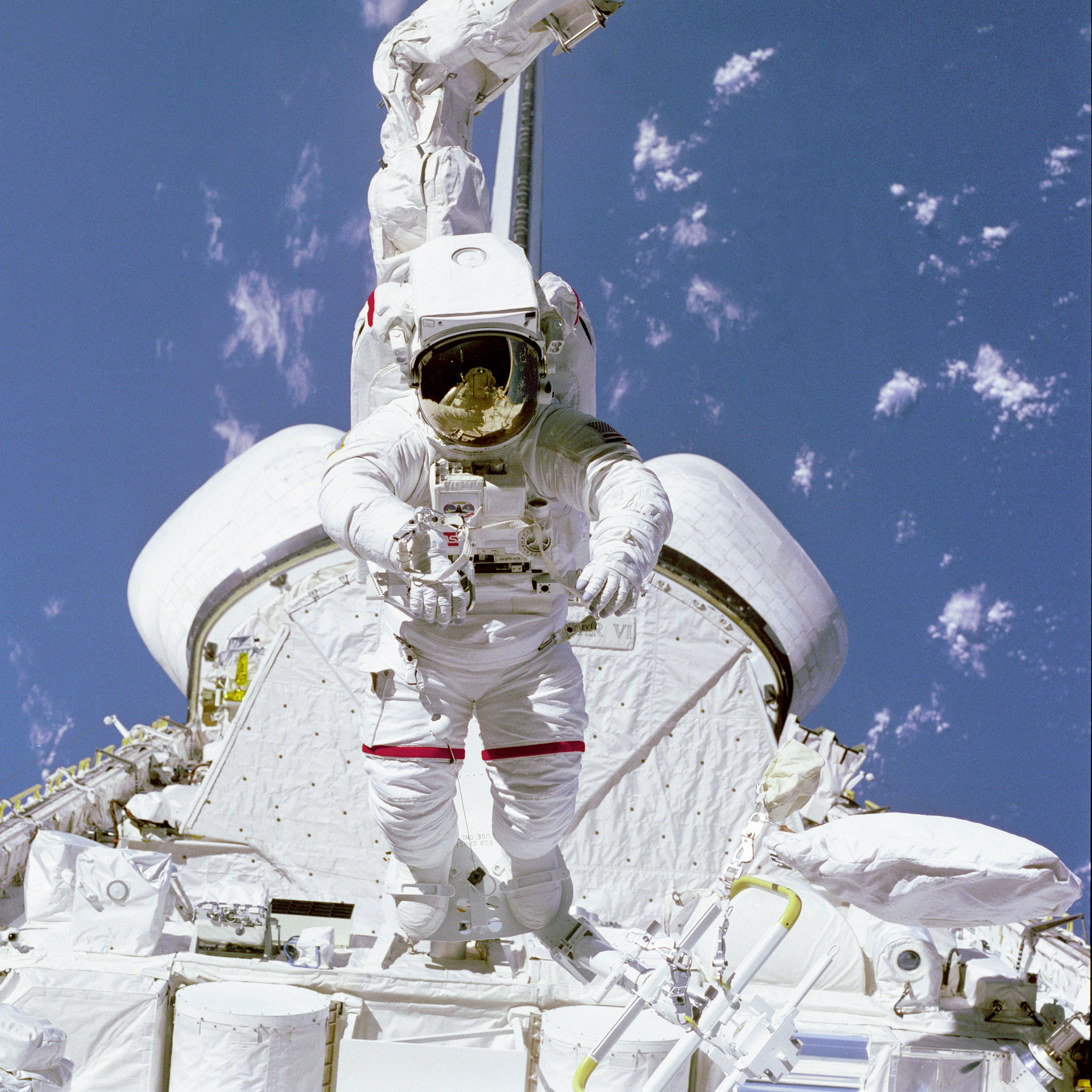
Bruce McCandless tests out the Remote Manipulator System foot restraint in the payload bay of Challenger during STS-41-B.

== 1985–1989 spacewalks ==
Spacewalk beginning and ending times are given in Coordinated Universal Time (UTC).

#	Spacecraft	Spacewalkers	Start (UTC)	End (UTC)	Duration
62.	STS-51-D; EVA 1	(United States) Jeffrey Hoffman (United States) S. David Griggs	16 April 1985	16 April 1985	3 h 06 min
62.	STS-51-D; EVA 1	Griggs and Hoffman installed an improvised switch-pulling tool, called the "flyswatter", on Discovery's RMS robotic arm. The "flyswatter" was used in an effort to push the sequencer start lever on the Syncom IV-3 satellite in the proper position for deployment. This attempted repair was the first unplanned spacewalk in NASA history.			
63.	Salyut 7 PE-4 – EVA 1	(Soviet Union) Vladimir Dzhanibekov (Soviet Union) Viktor Savinykh	August 2, 1985; 07:15	August 2, 1985; 12:15	5 h 00 min
63.	Salyut 7 PE-4 – EVA 1	Dzhanibekov and Savinykh, radio call name Pamir, installed the third pair of solar arrays on the Salyut 7			
64.	STS-51-I; EVA 1	(United States) William Fisher (United States) James van Hoften	August 31, 1985	August 31, 1985	7 h 20 min
64.	STS-51-I; EVA 1	Van Hoften rode the RMS to capture the Syncom IV-3 satellite and pulled it into Discovery's payload bay. Fisher and Van Hoften then secured and started repairs on the satellite in the payload bay. The retrieval was complicated by a malfunction of the RMS that made hindered its operation.			
65.	STS-51-I; EVA 2	(United States) William Fisher (United States) James van Hoften	September 1, 1985	September 1, 1985	4 h 26 min
65.	STS-51-I; EVA 2	Fisher and Van Hoften completed repairs on the Syncom IV-3 satellite. Then Van Hoften, riding the RMS, heaved the satellite out of the payload bay, imparting the spin needed for the satellite to fire its perigee motor.			
66.	STS-61-B; EVA 1	(United States) Jerry L. Ross (United States) Sherwood Spring	November 29, 1985	November 29, 1985	5 h 32 min
66.	STS-61-B; EVA 1	Ross and Spring practiced construction techniques in the payload bay of Atlantis. They assembled and disassembled the two experimental EASE/ACCESS structures.			
67.	STS-61-B; EVA 2	(United States) Jerry L. Ross (United States) Sherwood Spring	December 1, 1985	December 1, 1985	6 h 41 min
67.	STS-61-B; EVA 2	Ross and Spring conducted supplementary experiments on the EASE and ACCESS structures, including a test of the RMS to aid in the construction experiments.			
68.	Salyut 7 PE-6 – EVA 1	(Soviet Union) Leonid Kizim (Soviet Union) Vladimir Solovyov	28 May 1986; 05:43	28 May 1986; 09:33	3 h 50 min
68.	Salyut 7 PE-6 – EVA 1	Kizim and Solovyov retrieved test panels from the outside of Salyut 7 and assembled a test "girder-constructor" apparatus in preparation for work on Mir.			
69.	Salyut 7 PE-6 – EVA 2	(Soviet Union) Leonid Kizim (Soviet Union) Vladimir Solovyov	May 31, 1986; 04:57	May 31, 1986; 09:57	5 h 00 min
69.	Salyut 7 PE-6 – EVA 2	Kizim and Solovyov conducted additional tests on the experimental construction equipment, including the welding of several girder joints.			
70.	Mir PE-2 – EVA 1	(Soviet Union) Yuri Romanenko (Soviet Union) Aleksandr Laveykin	11 April 1987; 19:41	11 April 1987; 23:21	3 h 40 min
70.	Mir PE-2 – EVA 1	Romanenko and Laveykin made an unplanned spacewalk to examine the Kvant docking port, because it had failed to make a hard dock with Mir. They were able to remove debris lodged in the docking mechanism, allowing for a complete dock.			
71.	Mir PE-2 – EVA 2	(Soviet Union) Yuri Romanenko (Soviet Union) Aleksandr Laveykin	June 12, 1987; 16:55	June 12, 1987; 18:48	1 h 53 min
71.	Mir PE-2 – EVA 2	Romanenko and Laveykin expanded the electrical capacity of the Mir space station. They installed the first half of the solar array brought to orbit in Kvant.			
72.	Mir PE-2 – EVA 3	(Soviet Union) Yuri Romanenko (Soviet Union) Aleksandr Laveykin	June 16, 1987; 15:30	June 16, 1987; 18:45	3 h 15 min
72.	Mir PE-2 – EVA 3	Romanenko and Laveykin completed the expansion of electrical capacity on the Mir by installing the second half of the solar array carried to orbit in Kvant.			
73.	Mir PE-3 – EVA 1	(Soviet Union) Vladimir G. Titov (Soviet Union) Musa Manarov	February 26, 1988; 09:00	February 26, 1988; 13:55	4 h 25 min
73.	Mir PE-3 – EVA 1	Titov and Manarov replaced part of the array installed the previous year by Romanenko and Laveykin. They also found time to clear the portholes, which had become covered with dust. p.			
74.	Mir PE-3 – EVA 2	(Soviet Union) Vladimir G. Titov (Soviet Union) Musa Manarov	June 30, 1988; 05:33	June 30, 1988; 10:43	5 h 10 min
74.	Mir PE-3 – EVA 2	Titov and Manarov attempted to replace Kvant's X-ray telescope during a spacewalk that was not planned or rehearsed before launch. They trained by watching a videotape and talking to cosmonauts who had practiced the repair in a pool. The repair ended prematurely when a special wrench broke.			
75.	Mir PE-3 – EVA 3	(Soviet Union) Vladimir G. Titov (Soviet Union) Musa Manarov	20 October 1988; 05:59	20 October 1988; 10:11	4 h 12 min
75.	Mir PE-3 – EVA 3	Using new tools delivered to orbit on Progress 38, Titov and Manarov completed the replacement of Kvant's X-ray telescope.			
76.	Mir PE-4 – EVA 1	(Soviet Union) Alexander A. Volkov (France) Jean-Loup Chrétien	9 December 1988; 09:57	9 December 1988; 15:57	6 h 00 min
76.	Mir PE-4 – EVA 1	The first EVA by a French citizen commenced when Volkov and Chrétien ventured outside Mir to install hardware and experiments. The Soviet-French spacewalking team installed handrails, installed and wired the Enchantillons rack, and installed the ERA experimental package. At first, the ERA package failed to unfold when commanded from inside Mir. A swift kick from Volkov was needed for it to properly unfold.			

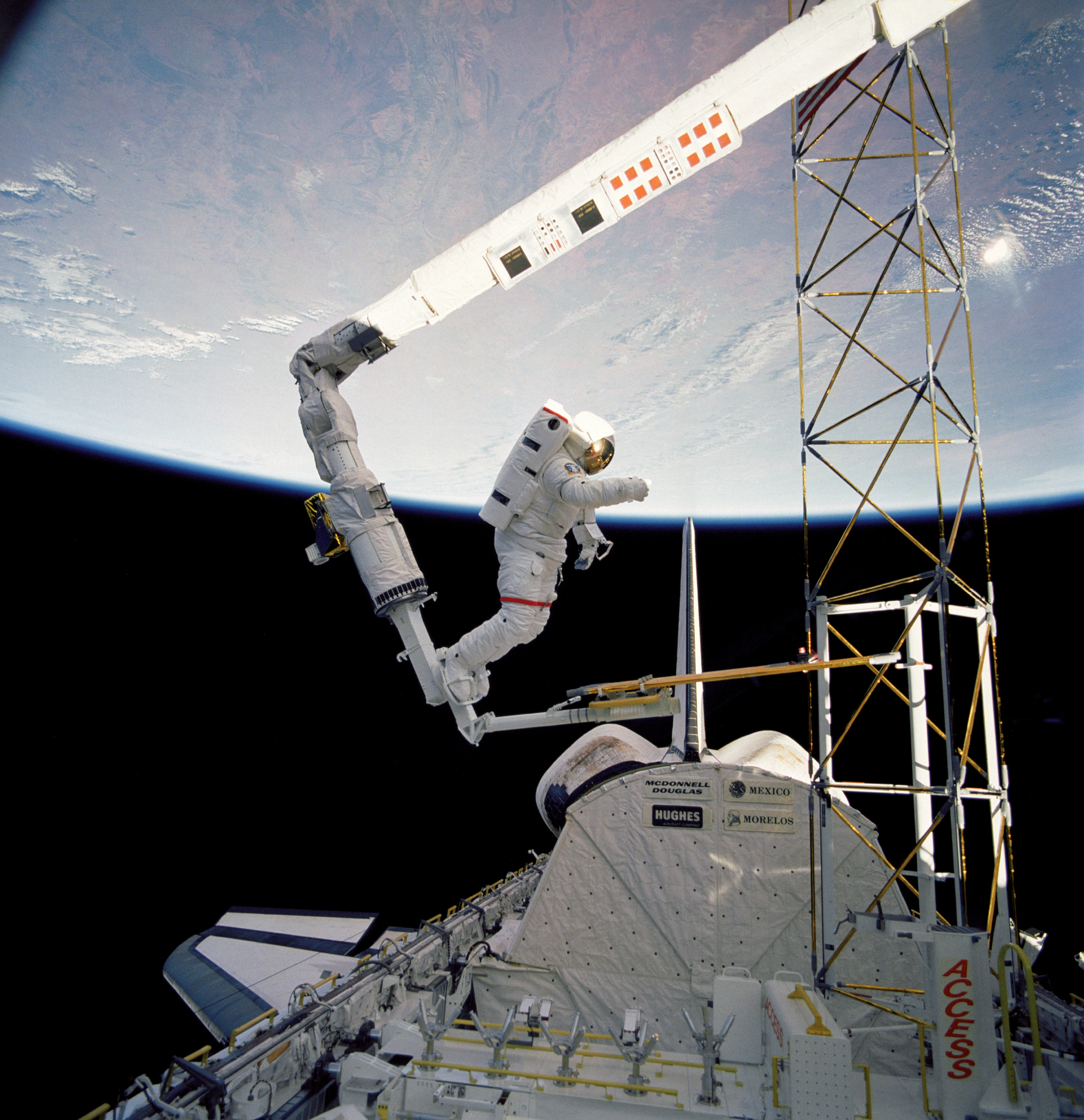
Jerry Ross rides the Remote Manipulator System while testing space station construction techniques in the payload bay of Atlantis during STS-61-B.

== 1990–1994 spacewalks ==
Spacewalk beginning and ending times are given in Coordinated Universal Time (UTC).

=== 1990 spacewalks ===
#	Spacecraft	Spacewalkers	Start (UTC)	End (UTC)	Duration
77.	Mir PE-5 – EVA 1	(Soviet Union) Alexander Viktorenko (Soviet Union) Aleksandr Serebrov	8 January 1990; 20:23	8 January 1990; 23:19	2 h 56 min
77.	Mir PE-5 – EVA 1	Viktorenko and Serebrov installed new star tracker sensors brought up in the Kvant-2 module onto Kvant.			
78.	Mir PE-5 – EVA 2	(Soviet Union) Alexander Viktorenko (Soviet Union) Aleksandr Serebrov	January 11, 1990; 18:01	January 11, 1990; 20:55	2 h 54 min
78.	Mir PE-5 – EVA 2	Viktorenko and Serebrov closed out experimental racks, either retrieving for return to Earth, or discarding into space. They also modified the docking node for the arrival of the Kristall module.			
79.	Mir PE-5 – EVA 3	(Soviet Union) Alexander Viktorenko (Soviet Union) Aleksandr Serebrov	January 26, 1990; 12:09	January 26, 1990; 15:11	3 h 02 min
79.	Mir PE-5 – EVA 3	Viktorenko and Serebrov tested the new Orlan-DMA spacesuit. This spacewalk team was the first use of the EVA airlock hatch on the Kvant-2 module. During the spacewalk a mooring post was attached outside the airlock, and a Kurs antenna was removed to enable future EVAs.			
80.	Mir PE-5 – EVA 4	(Soviet Union) Alexander Viktorenko (Soviet Union) Aleksandr Serebrov	February 1, 1990; 08:15	February 1, 1990; 13:14	4 h 59 min
80.	Mir PE-5 – EVA 4	Viktorenko and Serebrov tested the SPK "flying armchair", analogous to NASA's MMU. The SPK did not fly free, but remained tethered to Kvant-2 during the tests.			
81.	Mir PE-5 – EVA 5	(Soviet Union) Alexander Viktorenko (Soviet Union) Aleksandr Serebrov	February 5, 1990; 06:08	February 5, 1990; 09:53	3 h 45 min
81.	Mir PE-5 – EVA 5	Viktorenko and Serebrov conducted more tests of the SPK. Viktorenko reached as far as 45 metres (148 ft) from Mir.			
82.	Mir PE-6 – EVA 1	(Soviet Union) Anatoly Solovyev (Soviet Union) Aleksandr Balandin	July 17, 1990; 13:06	July 17, 1990; 20:22	7 h 00 min
82.	Mir PE-6 – EVA 1	At the start of their EVA to repair torn insulation on Soyuz TM-9, Solovyev and Balandin damaged the hatch on Kvant-2 by opening it before the airlock was completely depressurized. The spacewalking team repaired the insulation on Soyuz, but time constraints required returning to Kvant-2 before they collected their tools and ladders. Unable to securely close the damaged hatch, they used the center section of Kvant-2 as a back-up airlock.			
83.	Mir PE-6 – EVA 2	(Soviet Union) Anatoly Solovyev (Soviet Union) Aleksandr Balandin	July 26, 1990; 11:15	July 26, 1990; 14:46	3 h 31 min
83.	Mir PE-6 – EVA 2	Solovyev and Balandin left Mir through the damaged Kvant-2 hatch. They transmitted images of the damaged hatch to TsUP. They also recovered the ladders and tools left outside earlier. After removing debris lodged in the hinge of the airlock hatch, it was able to close and seal for repressurization.			
84.	Mir PE-7 – EVA 1	(Soviet Union) Gennadi Manakov (Soviet Union) Gennady Strekalov	29 October 1990; 21:45	October 30, 1990; 00:30	2 h 45 min
84.	Mir PE-7 – EVA 1	Manakov and Strekalov exited Mir through the damaged Kvant-2 airlock hatch. After removing insulation around the hatch, they found the hatch to be more heavily damaged than previously understood. Although unable to completely repair the hatch, they added hardware to the hatch and returned to Mir.			

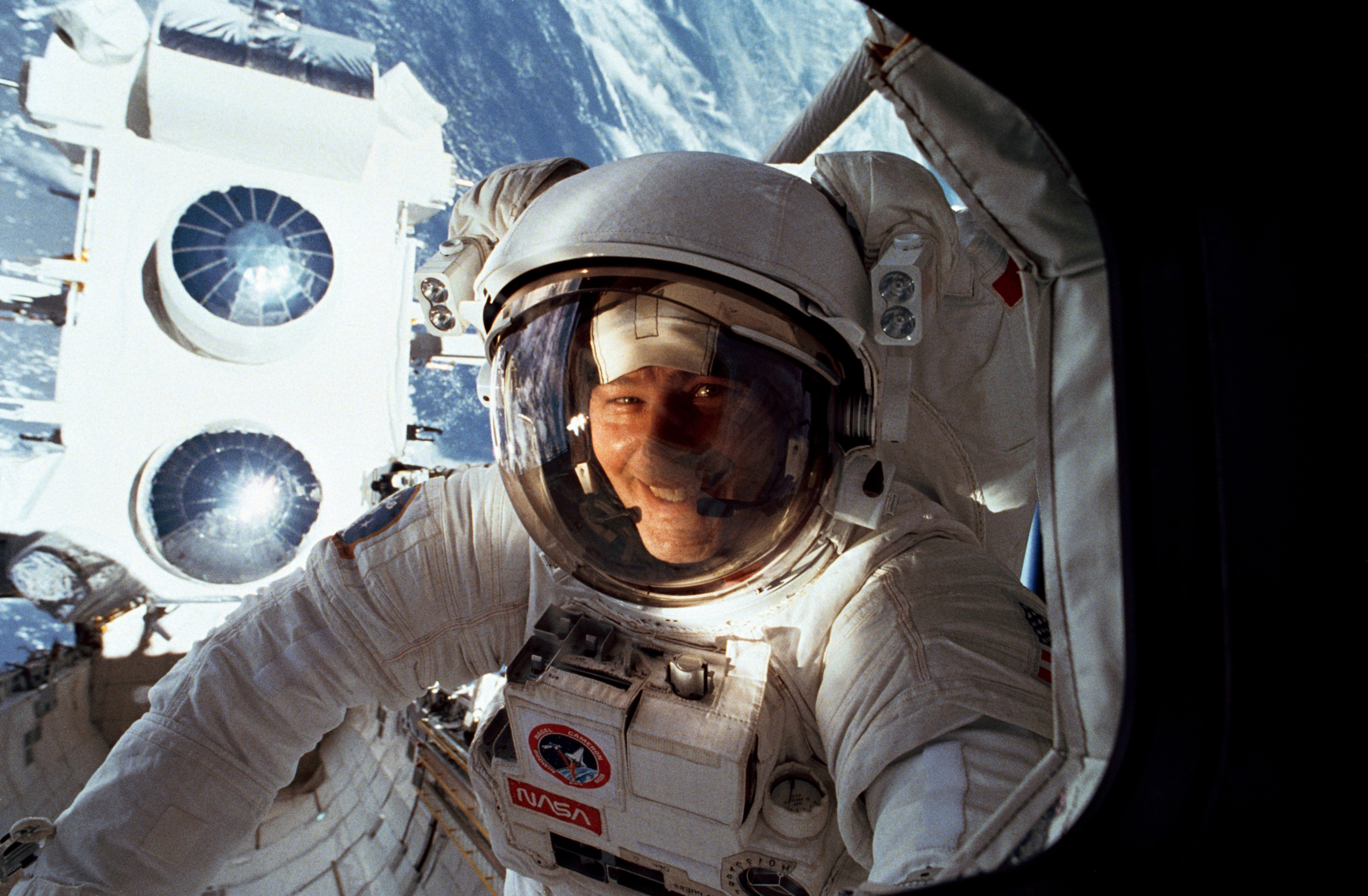
Jerry Ross performs an unscheduled EVA to release the high-gain antenna on the Compton Gamma Ray Observatory, berthed inside the payload bay of Atlantis during STS-37.

=== 1991 spacewalks ===
#	Spacecraft	Spacewalkers	Start (UTC)	End (UTC)	Duration
85.	Mir PE-8 – EVA 1	(Soviet Union) Viktor M. Afanasyev (Soviet Union) Musa Manarov	January 7, 1991; 17:03	January 7, 1991; 22:21	5 h 18 min
85.	Mir PE-8 – EVA 1	Afanasyev and Manarov successfully repaired the damaged hatch on the Kvant-2 airlock. The spacewalk team also positioned equipment for installation in a later EVA.			
86.	Mir PE-8 – EVA 2	(Soviet Union) Viktor M. Afanasyev (Soviet Union) Musa Manarov	January 23, 1991; 10:59	January 23, 1991; 16:32	5 h 33 min
86.	Mir PE-8 – EVA 2	Afanasyev and Manarov exited Mir through the newly repaired hatch on Kvant-2. They then installed the new Stela boom on the base block.			
87.	Mir PE-8 – EVA 3	(Soviet Union) Viktor M. Afanasyev (Soviet Union) Musa Manarov	January 26, 1991; 09:00	January 26, 1991; 15:20	6 h 20 min
87.	Mir PE-8 – EVA 3	Afanasyev and Manarov spent more than 6 hours installing supports on Kvant to hold the solar arrays on Kristall.			
88.	STS-37 – EVA 1	(United States) Jerry L. Ross (United States) Jerome Apt	April 7, 1991,	April 7, 1991,	4 h 26 min
88.	STS-37 – EVA 1	When the boom antenna on the GRO satellite would not extend, Ross and Apt exited the shuttle on an unplanned EVA to extend the boom to prepare the satellite for its final release into orbit.			
89.	STS-37 – EVA 2	(United States) Jerry L. Ross (United States) Jerome Apt	April 8, 1991,	April 8, 1991,	5 h 47 min
89.	STS-37 – EVA 2	Ross and Apt installed and tested several monorail-type mobility tools for future space station construction.			
90.	Mir PE-8 – EVA 4	(Soviet Union) Viktor M. Afanasyev (Soviet Union) Musa Manarov	April 25, 1991; 20:29	April 26, 1991; 00:03	3 h 34 min
90.	Mir PE-8 – EVA 4	Manarov inspected and filmed the Kurs antenna on Kvant, finding that one of the antenna dishes was missing. Then Afanasyev and Manarov re-installed the camera on Kvant-2 that they had earlier removed and repaired.			
91.	Mir PE-9 – EVA 1	(Soviet Union) Anatoly Artsebarsky (Soviet Union) Sergei Krikalev	June 24, 1991; 21:11	25 June 1991; 02:09	4 h 58 min
91.	Mir PE-9 – EVA 1	Artsebarsky and Krikalev started the EVA from the Kvant-2 airlock, climbed across Mir to the opposite end, and replaced the damaged Kurs antenna. Before returning to the airlock, they also performed assembly tests on an experimental structural joint.			
92.	Mir PE-9 – EVA 2	(Soviet Union) Anatoly Artsebarsky (Soviet Union) Sergei Krikalev	June 28, 1991; 19:02	June 28, 1991; 22:26	3 h 24 min
92.	Mir PE-9 – EVA 2	Artsebarski and Krikalev attached TREK, a type of cosmic ray detector developed at the University of California, to the outside of Mir.			
93.	Mir PE-9 – EVA 3	(Soviet Union) Anatoly Artsebarsky (Soviet Union) Sergei Krikalev	July 15, 1991; 11:45	July 15, 1991; 17:41	5 h 56 min
93.	Mir PE-9 – EVA 3	Using the Stela boom, Artsebarsky and Krikalev moved ladders and the base platform parts for the Sofora girder from the Kvant-2 airlock and installed the components on the Kvant module.			
94.	Mir PE-9 – EVA 4	(Soviet Union) Anatoly Artsebarsky (Soviet Union) Sergei Krikalev	19 July 1991; 11:10	19 July 1991; 16:38	5 h 28 min
94.	Mir PE-9 – EVA 4	Artsebarsky and Krikalev started construction of the Sofora girder. Three of 20 structural pieces were installed.			
95.	Mir PE-9 – EVA 5	(Soviet Union) Anatoly Artsebarsky (Soviet Union) Sergei Krikalev	23 July 1991; 09:15	23 July 1991; 14:57	5 h 42 min
95.	Mir PE-9 – EVA 5	Artsebarsky and Krikalev continued the construction of the Sofora girder. Eleven more of the 20 girder pieces were installed.			
96.	Mir PE-9 – EVA 6	(Soviet Union) Anatoly Artsebarsky (Soviet Union) Sergei Krikalev	July 27, 1991; 08:44	July 27, 1991; 15:33	6 h 49 min
96.	Mir PE-9 – EVA 6	Artsebarsky and Krikalev completed assembly of the Sofora girder and the spacewalking team mounted a small Soviet flag on top of the structure. Artsebarsky had trouble with fogging on his visor, due to overexertion, but Krikalev was able to lead him back to the airlock.			

=== 1992 spacewalks ===
#	Spacecraft	Spacewalkers	Start (UTC)	End (UTC)	Duration
97.	Mir PE-10 – EVA 1	(Russia) Alexander A. Volkov (Russia) Sergei Krikalev	20 February 1992; 20:09	21 February 1992; 00:21	4 h 12 min
97.	Mir PE-10 – EVA 1	Volkov and Krikalev performed maintenance activities on the outside of Mir, including cleaning camera lenses. Volkov had problems with the cooling system on his Orlan space suit, and was limited in his mobility.			
98.	STS-49 – EVA 1	(United States) Pierre Thuot (United States) Richard Hieb	10 May 1992; 20:40	11 May 1992; 00:23	3 h 43 min
98.	STS-49 – EVA 1	Thuot attempted to capture the Intelsat VI satellite using a capture bar carried up in Endeavour while Hieb stood by to assist with placement in the payload bay. After multiple attempts to catch Intelsat VI, the spacewalkers returned to the airlock to consider the failed attempts.			
99.	STS-49 – EVA 2	(United States) Pierre Thuot (United States) Richard Hieb	11 May 1992; 21:05	12 May 1992; 02:35	5 h 30 min
99.	STS-49 – EVA 2	Thuot tried five more times to capture Intelsat VI while Hieb stood by to assist. Once again Thuot was unable to engage the capture bar to the satellite.			
100.	STS-49 – EVA 3	(United States) Pierre Thuot (United States) Richard Hieb (United States) Thomas Akers	13 May 1992; 21:17	14 May 1992; 05:46	8 h 29 min
100.	STS-49 – EVA 3	Thuot, Hieb and Akers captured Intelsat VI with their hands. The trio then pulled the satellite into the payload bay, added a new perigee kick motor, and launched the satellite away from Endeavour. This spacewalk was the first (and only) three-person spacewalk in history. The three spacewalkers also set a new record for elapsed spacewalk time.			
101.	STS-49 – EVA 4	(United States) Thomas Akers (United States) Kathryn Thornton	14 May 1992; ~21:00	15 May 1992; ~04:45	7 h 44 min
101.	STS-49 – EVA 4	Akers and Thornton tested space station assembly techniques on an experimental structure, the Assembly of Station by Extravehicular Activity Methods (ASEM). The experiments with ASEM were intended to help with the design of the planned Space Station Freedom.			
102.	Mir PE-11 – EVA 1	(Russia) Alexander Viktorenko (Russia) Alexander Kaleri	8 July 1992; 12:38	8 July 1992; 14:41	2 h 03 min
102.	Mir PE-11 – EVA 1	Viktorenko and Kaleri inspected several gyrodynes, located on the Kvant-2 module, near the airlock. Their inspection provided data needed to prepare for the planned repair and replacement work.			
103.	Mir PE-12 – EVA 1	(Russia) Sergei Avdeyev (Russia) Anatoly Solovyev	3 September 1992; 13:32	3 September 1992; 17:28	3 h 56 min
103.	Mir PE-12 – EVA 1	Avdeyev and Solvyev moved the VDU thruster unit and prepared the Sofora girder for installation of the VDU.			
104.	Mir PE-12 – EVA 2	(Russia) Sergei Avdeyev (Russia) Anatoly Solovyev	7 September 1992; 11:47	7 September 1992; 16:55	5 h 08 min
104.	Mir PE-12 – EVA 2	Avdeyev and Solvyev installed the electrical and control cables needed by the VDU thruster for operation on the Sofora truss. They also recovered the Soviet flag installed on the Sofora truss the year before, which had been destroyed by UV radiation and micrometeoroids.			
105.	Mir PE-12 – EVA 3	(Russia) Sergei Avdeyev (Russia) Anatoly Solovyev	11 September 1992; 10:06	11 September 1992; 15:50	5 h 44 min
105.	Mir PE-12 – EVA 3	Avdeyev and Solvyev completed install of the VDU thruster on Sofora truss, and moved the truss into its extended position.			
106.	Mir PE-12 – EVA 4	(Russia) Sergei Avdeyev (Russia) Anatoly Solovyev	15 September 1992; 07:49	15 September 1992; 11:22	3 h 33 min
106.	Mir PE-12 – EVA 4	Avdeyev and Solvyev collected samples of a solar array and relocated the Kurs docking antenna on the Kristall module in preparation for the arrival of Soyuz TM-16.			

=== 1993 spacewalks ===
#	Spacecraft	Spacewalkers	Start (UTC)	End (UTC)	Duration
107.	STS-54 – EVA 1	(United States) Gregory Harbaugh (United States) Mario Runco	17 January 1993	17 January 1993	4 h 28 min
107.	STS-54 – EVA 1	Harbaugh and Runco tested space station construction techniques and mobility techniques. They proved that some techniques were useful, and some were not.			
108.	Mir PE-13 – EVA 1	(Russia) Gennadi Manakov (Russia) Alexander Poleshchuk	19 April 1993; 17:15	19 April 1993; 22:40	5 h 25 min
108.	Mir PE-13 – EVA 1	Manakov and Poleshchuk used the Strela boom to install an electric motor on the Kvant module for solar arrays originally installed on the Kristall module. After the installation, Poleshchuk noticed that one of the handles on the Strela boom had become loose and drifted away from Mir. The loss of the Strela handle meant the next EVA would have to be delayed until a new handle could be lifted to orbit the next Progress supply launch.			
109.	Mir PE-13 – EVA 2	(Russia) Gennadi Manakov (Russia) Alexander Poleshchuk	18 June 1993; 17:25	18 June 1993; 21:58	4 h 33 min
109.	Mir PE-13 – EVA 2	After receiving the replacement part, Manakov and Poleshchuk first repaired the Strela boom and then installed the second electric drive for the solar array.			
110.	STS-57 – EVA 1	(United States) G. David Low (United States) Peter Wisoff	25 June 1993,	25 June 1993,	5 h 50 min
110.	STS-57 – EVA 1	Low and Wisoff helped secure the antenna on the captured EURECA satellite in its stored position for return to Earth. Then both spacewalkers practiced space station construction maneuvers on the RMS.			
111.	Mir PE-14 – EVA 1	(Russia) Vasili Tsibliyev (Russia) Aleksandr Serebrov	16 September 1993; 05:57	16 September 1993; 10:16	4 h 18 min
111.	Mir PE-14 – EVA 1	Tsibliyev and Serebrov began assembly of the experimental Rapana truss structure.			
112.	STS-51 – EVA 1	(United States) James H. Newman (United States) Carl Walz	16 September 1993; 08:40	16 September 1993; 15:45	7 h 05 min
112.	STS-51 – EVA 1	Newman and Walz carried out tests on tools, tethers, and a foot restraint system in anticipation of the repair of the Hubble Space Telescope. A stuck tool chest lid slowed the closeout of spacewalk for at least 45 minutes.			
113.	Mir PE-14 – EVA 2	(Russia) Vasili Tsibliyev (Russia) Aleksandr Serebrov	20 September 1993; 03:51:50	20 September 1993; 07:05:40	3 h 13 min
113.	Mir PE-14 – EVA 2	Tsibliyev and Serebrov completed the assembly of the Rapana truss. The experience gained from the construction of the truss was later used in future station designs, such as the International Space Station.			
114.	Mir PE-14 – EVA 3	(Russia) Vasili Tsibliyev (Russia) Aleksandr Serebrov	28 September 1993; 00:57	28 September 1993; 02:48	1 h 52 min
114.	Mir PE-14 – EVA 3	Tsibliyev and Serebrov inspected Mir's exterior for damage from the recent Perseid meteoroid shower. The most notable damage they found was a 5-millimetre (0.20 in) hole in one of the solar arrays.			
115.	Mir PE-14 – EVA 4	(Russia) Vasili Tsibliyev (Russia) Aleksandr Serebrov	22 October 1993; 15:47	22 October 1993; 16:25	0 h 38 min
115.	Mir PE-14 – EVA 4	Tsibliyev and Serebrov continued their inspection of Mir from damage from the Perseids.			
116.	Mir PE-14 – EVA 5	(Russia) Vasili Tsibliyev (Russia) Aleksandr Serebrov	29 October 1993; 13:38	29 October 1993; 17:50	4 h 12 min
116.	Mir PE-14 – EVA 5	Tsibliyev and Serebrov completed their inspection of the entire exterior of Mir. They observed several marks on the hull, but there were no complete penetrations. However, the spacewalking team noticed an unidentified piece of metal drifting by the station during their inspections.			
117.	STS-61 – EVA 1	(United States) Story Musgrave (United States) Jeffrey Hoffman	5 December 1993; 03:44	5 December 1993; 11:38	7 h 50 min
117.	STS-61 – EVA 1	Musgrave and Hoffman replaced two sets of gyroscopes and electrical control units, as well as a set of 8 fuses on Hubble. The spacewalkers had considerable difficulty closing the latches on the gyro doors, probably due to thermal expansion of the closure bolts. Working closely with engineers on the ground, the team was able to force the door to latch closed. Before re-entering the shuttle, they prepared the payload bay for the next EVA.			
118.	STS-61 – EVA 2	(United States) Kathryn C. Thornton (United States) Thomas Akers	6 December 1993; 03:29	6 December 1993; 10:05	6 h 36 min
118.	STS-61 – EVA 2	Thorton rode the RMS to handle the solar arrays while Akers made the cable connections as the team replaced two solar arrays on the Hubble. One array was discarded into space, and one array was furled and stowed for return to Earth.			
119.	STS-61 – EVA 3	(United States) Story Musgrave (United States) Jeffrey Hoffman	7 December 1993; 03:35	7 December 1993; 10:22	6 h 47 min
119.	STS-61 – EVA 3	Musgrave and Hoffman replaced the Hubble WFPC with WFPC 2. They also replaced two magnetometers before returning to Endeavour.			
120.	STS-61 – EVA 4	(United States) Kathryn C. Thornton (United States) Thomas Akers	8 December 1993; 03:13	8 December 1993; 10:03	7 h 21 min
120.	STS-61 – EVA 4	Thornton and Akers replaced Hubble's High Speed Photometer (HSP) with the Corrective Optics Space Telescope Axial Replacement (COSTAR). This replacement corrected the spherical aberration in Hubble's mirror. The HSP was stowed for return to Earth.			
121.	STS-61 – EVA 5	(United States) Story Musgrave (United States) Jeffrey Hoffman	9 December 1993; 03:30	9 December 1993; 10:51	7 h 21 min
121.	STS-61 – EVA 5	Musgrave and Hoffman replaced the electronics for the solar array drive motors. They also placed some improvised covers over the new magnetometers to protect them from debris.			

=== 1994 spacewalks ===
#	Spacecraft	Spacewalkers	Start (UTC)	End (UTC)	Duration
122.	Mir PE-16 – EVA 1	(Russia) Yuri Malenchenko (Russia) Talgat Musabayev	9 September 1994; 07:00	9 September 1994; 12:06	5 h 04 min
122.	Mir PE-16 – EVA 1	Malenchenko and Musabayev inspected a docking port on Kvant-2 for damage from a collision with Progress M-24. They also inspected the Kristall module for damage from a collision with Soyuz TM-17 and repaired that module near where it connected to the base block of Mir.			
123.	Mir PE-16 – EVA 2	(Russia) Yuri Malenchenko (Russia) Talgat Musabayev	13 September 1994; 06:30	13 September 1994; 12:32	6 h 01 min
123.	Mir PE-16 – EVA 2	Malenchenko and Musabayev continued construction work in preparation of moving solar arrays from the Kristall module to the Kvant-2 module.			
124.	STS-64 – EVA 1	(United States) Mark C. Lee (United States) Carl Meade	16 September 1994; 14:42	16 September 1994; 21:33	6 h 51 min
124.	STS-64 – EVA 1	Lee and Meade carried out successful untethered tests of the SAFER EVA rescue device.			

== 1995–1999 spacewalks ==
Spacewalk beginning and ending times are given in Coordinated Universal Time (UTC).

=== 1995 spacewalks ===
#	Spacecraft	Spacewalkers	Start (UTC)	End (UTC)	Duration
125.	STS-63 – EVA 1	(United States) Michael Foale (United States) Bernard Harris	9 February 1995; 11:56	9 February 1995; 16:35	4 h 39 min
125.	STS-63 – EVA 1	Foale and Harris conducted a test of moving large mass objects. They also tested the effectiveness of new spacesuit temperature control underwear by being lofted outside the payload bay by the RMS. Harris was the first African-American to perform an EVA.			
126.	Mir PE-18 – EVA 1	(Russia) Vladimir N. Dezhurov (Russia) Gennady Strekalov	12 May 1995; 04:20:44	12 May 1995; 10:35:16	6 h 14 min 32 s
126.	Mir PE-18 – EVA 1	Dezhurov and Strekalov made preparations for the arrival of the Spektr module. They installed some electrical cable attachments, adjusted solar array actuators, and practiced folding the Kristall solar arrays for the future move to Kvant.			
127.	Mir PE-18 – EVA 2	(Russia) Vladimir N. Dezhurov (Russia) Gennady Strekalov	17 May 1995; 02:38	17 May 1995; 09:20	6 h 52 min
127.	Mir PE-18 – EVA 2	Dezhurov and Strekalov moved the solar arrays from Kristall to Kvant. Their suits ran low on oxygen before they were able to re-install the arrays on Kvant. They secured the arrays and tools to Kvant and returned to Mir.			
128.	Mir PE-18 – EVA 3	(Russia) Vladimir N. Dezhurov (Russia) Gennady Strekalov	22 May 1995; 00:10:20	22 May 1995; 05:25:11	5 h 14 min 51 s
128.	Mir PE-18 – EVA 3	Dezhurov and Strekalov completed installation of the relocated solar array on Kvant. They also retracted some solar panels to prepare for moving Kristall.			
129.	Mir PE-18 – EVA 4	(Russia) Vladimir N. Dezhurov (Russia) Gennady Strekalov	28 May 1995; 22:22	28 May 1995; 22:43	0 h 21 min
129.	Mir PE-18 – EVA 4	Conducting a spacewalk inside the transfer compartment of the Mir base block, Dezhurov and Strekalov relocated the docking cone from the -X port to the -Z port.			
130.	Mir PE-18 – EVA 5	(Russia) Vladimir N. Dezhurov (Russia) Gennady Strekalov	1 June 1995; 22:05:30	1 June 1995; 22:28:20	0 h 22 min 50 s
130.	Mir PE-18 – EVA 5	Again working from the depressurized base block transfer compartment, Dezhurov and Strekalov prepared to move the recently arrived Spektr module by relocating the docking cone from the -Z port to the -Y port.			
131.	Mir PE-19 – EVA 1	(Russia) Anatoly Solovyev (Russia) Nikolai Budarin	14 July 1995; 03:56	14 July 1995; 09:30	5 h 34 min
131.	Mir PE-19 – EVA 1	Solovyev and Budarin used the Strela boom to move to the Spektr module and freed the stuck solar array. They also inspected the -Z docking port and found it to be undamaged.			
132.	Mir PE-19 – EVA 2	(Russia) Anatoly Solovyev (Russia) Nikolai Budarin	19 July 1995; 00:39	19 July 1995; 03:47	3 h 08 min
132.	Mir PE-19 – EVA 2	Solovyev had problems with his Orlan-DMA spacesuit cooling system, and had to stay tethered to an umbilical at Kvant-2. Budarin was able work his way to the far end of Spektr and do some preparations for the installation of the Mir infrared spectrometer (MIRAS). He also collected the American TREK cosmic ray panel that had been installed on Kvant-2 since 1991.			
133.	Mir PE-19 – EVA 3	(Russia) Anatoly Solovyev (Russia) Nikolai Budarin	21 July 1995; 00:28	21 July 1995; 06:18	5 h 50 min
133.	Mir PE-19 – EVA 3	Solovyev and Budarin used the Strela boom to reach the Spektr module, where they completed the installation of MIRAS.			
134.	STS-69 – EVA 1	(United States) James S. Voss (United States) Michael Gernhardt	16 September 1995; 08:20	16 September 1995; 15:06	6 h 46 min
134.	STS-69 – EVA 1	Voss and Gernhardt installed thermal instruments in the payload bay of Endeavour and tested construction techniques in support of the International Space Station. They also tested redesigned spacesuit helmet lights and spacesuit heaters.			
135.	Mir PE-20 – EVA 1	(Russia) Sergei Avdeyev (Germany) Thomas Reiter	20 October 1995; 11:50	20 October 1995; 17:06	5 h 16 min
135.	Mir PE-20 – EVA 1	Reiter completed the first European Space Agency EVA. Avdeyev and Reiter used the Strela boom to move to the Spektr module. Afterwards they installed several experiments on the European Space Exposure Facility before returning to the airlock.			
136.	Mir PE-20 – EVA 2	(Russia) Sergei Avdeyev (Russia) Yuri Gidzenko	8 December 1995; 19:23	8 December 1995; 19:52	0 h 37 min
136.	Mir PE-20 – EVA 2	From inside the depressurized base block transfer compartment, Avdeyev and Gidzenko moved the Konus docking cone from the -Z port to the +Z port.			

=== 1996 spacewalks ===
#	Spacecraft	Spacewalkers	Start (UTC)	End (UTC)	Duration
137.	STS-72 – EVA 1	(United States) Leroy Chiao (United States) Daniel Barry	15 January 1996; 05:35	15 January 1996; 11:44	6 h 09 min
137.	STS-72 – EVA 1	Chiao and Barry practiced construction techniques for the upcoming International Space Station. Their activities included installing a cable tray, hooking up cables and fluid lines, handling small screws and bolts, and grappling large objects at the end of the RMS.			
138.	STS-72 – EVA 2	(United States) Leroy Chiao (United States) Winston E. Scott	17 January 1996; 05:40	17 January 1996; 12:34	6 h 53 min
138.	STS-72 – EVA 2	Chiao and Scott continued testing of construction techniques. They worked with utility boxes, slidewires and a portable work station attached to the RMS. Scott also tested the heating capabilities of his spacesuit by riding the RMS during the night while Endeavour's payload bay was oriented toward space.			
139.	Mir PE-20 – EVA 3	(Germany) Thomas Reiter (Russia) Yuri Gidzenko	8 February 1996; 14:03	8 February 1996; 17:08	3 h 06 min
139.	Mir PE-20 – EVA 3	Reiter and Gidzenko moved a YMK maneuvering unit from the Kvant-2 airlock and secured it on the module's exterior. They then collected experiments deployed earlier on the ESEF. The team was unable to remove an antenna from Kristall when they were unable to loosen some bolts on the antenna.			
140.	Mir PE-21 – EVA 1	(Russia) Yuri Onufriyenko (Russia) Yury Usachev	15 March 1996; 01:04	15 March 1996; 06:55	5 h 51 min
140.	Mir PE-21 – EVA 1	To improve access to the outside of the Kristall module, Onufriyenko and Usachev installed a second Strela boom on the Mir base block. The team also prepared cables and connectors for the future installation of the Mir Cooperative Solar Array.			
141.	STS-76/Mir PE-21	(United States) Michael R. Clifford (United States) Linda Godwin	27 March 1996; 06:34	27 March 1996; 12:36	6 h 02 min
141.	STS-76/Mir PE-21	Godwin and Clifford added four canisters of experiments, called the Mir Environmental Effects Payload (MEEP), to the outside of the Mir docking module. They also tested new tethers and foot restraints for future use on Mir and the upcoming International Space Station.			
142.	Mir PE-21 – EVA 2	(Russia) Yuri Onufriyenko (Russia) Yury Usachev	20 May 1996; 22:50	21 May 1996; 04:10	5 h 20 min
142.	Mir PE-21 – EVA 2	Onufriyenko and Usachev moved the Mir Cooperative Solar Array (MCSA) from its stowage position on Kristal to a final location on Kvant, and prepared the array for complete deployment. They also released a balloon shaped like a large Pepsi can, and filmed it for a television commercial.			
143.	Mir PE-21 – EVA 3	(Russia) Yuri Onufriyenko (Russia) Yury Usachev	24 May 1996; 20:47	25 May 1996; 02:30	5 h 43 min
143.	Mir PE-21 – EVA 3	Onufriyenko and Usachev completed deployment of the Mir Cooperative Solar Array (MCSA) on the Kvant module.			
144.	Mir PE-21 – EVA 4	(Russia) Yuri Onufriyenko (Russia) Yury Usachev	30 May 1996; 18:20	30 May 1996; 22:40	4 h 20 min
144.	Mir PE-21 – EVA 4	Onufriyenko and Usachev installed the German-made Modular Optoelectronic Multispectral Scanner (MOMS) camera to the exterior of the Priroda module. They also installed a new handrail on the exterior of Kvant-2 to aid future spacewalks.			
145.	Mir PE-21 – EVA 5	(Russia) Yuri Onufriyenko (Russia) Yury Usachev	6 June 1996; 16:56	6 June 1996; 20:30	3 h 34 min
145.	Mir PE-21 – EVA 5	Onufriyenko and Usachev installed two American micrometeoroid detector experiments to the exterior of Kvant-2. The team also replaced a data cassette for the Komza experiment of the surface of Spektr.			
146.	Mir PE-21 – EVA 6	(Russia) Yuri Onufriyenko (Russia) Yury Usachev	13 June 1996; 12:45	13 June 1996; 18:27	5 h 42 min
146.	Mir PE-21 – EVA 6	Onufriyenko and Usachev installed the Rapana girder to the exterior of Kvant in anticipation of mounting future experiments to the girder. They also manually deployed the Travers radar on the surface of Priroda.			
147.	Mir PE-22 – EVA 1	(Russia) Valery Korzun (Russia) Alexander Kaleri	2 December 1996; 15:54	2 December 1996; 21:51	5 h 57 min
147.	Mir PE-22 – EVA 1	Korzun and Kaleri successfully connected electrical cables to the surface-mounted solar panels installed on Kvant.			
148.	Mir PE-22 – EVA 2	(Russia) Valery Korzun (Russia) Alexander Kaleri	9 December 1996; 13:52	9 December 1996; 20:28	6 h 36 min
148.	Mir PE-22 – EVA 2	Korzun and Kaleri completed the construction of the Rapana truss structure and then installed the Kurs docking antenna. They also fixed an amateur radio antenna that had loosened.			

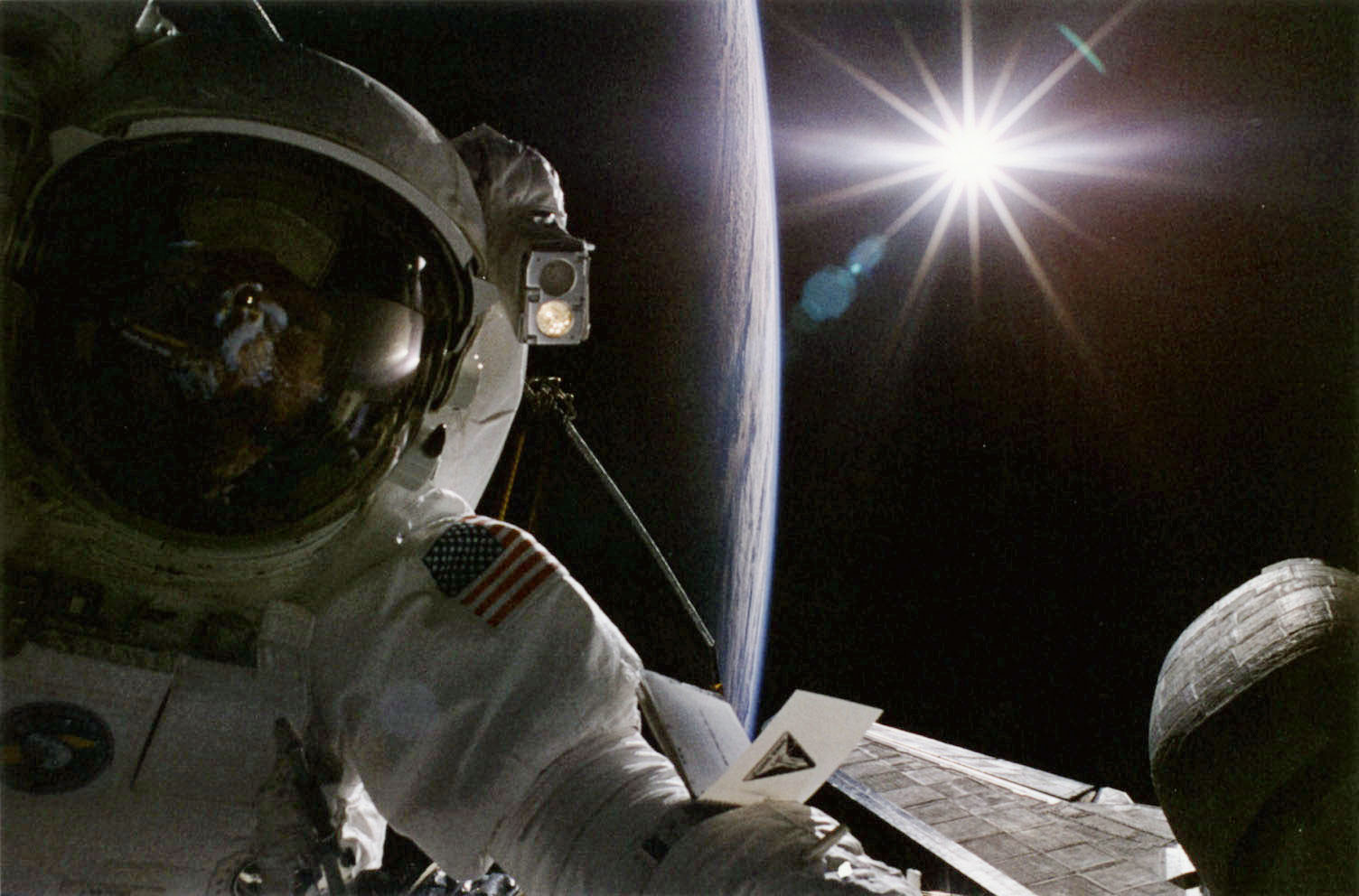
Joseph Tanner on an EVA to maintain the Hubble Space Telescope during STS-82

=== 1997 spacewalks ===
#	Spacecraft	Spacewalkers	Start (UTC)	End (UTC)	Duration
149.	STS-82 – EVA 1	(United States) Mark C. Lee (United States) Steven Smith	14 February 1997; 04:34	14 February 1997; 11:16	6 h 42 min
149.	STS-82 – EVA 1	Lee and Smith accessed Hubble from its aft shroud doors. The spacewalkers swapped out the Goddard High Resolution Spectrograph (GHRS) for the Near Infrared Camera and Multi-Object Spectrometer and replaced the Faint Object Spectrograph (FOS) with the Space Telescope Imaging Spectrograph. They closed out the EVA by closing the aft shroud doors and stowing the GHRS and FOS for return to Earth.			
150.	STS-82 – EVA 2	(United States) Gregory J. Harbaugh (United States) Joseph R. Tanner	15 February 1997; 03:25	15 February 1997; 10:52	7 h 27 min
150.	STS-82 – EVA 2	Harbaugh and Tanner replaced the Fine Guidance Sensor and an Engineering and Science Tape Recorder with spare replacement units on Hubble. They also installed a new hardware piece, the Optical Control Electronics Enhancement Kit.			
151.	STS-82 – EVA 3	(United States) Mark C. Lee (United States) Steven Smith	16 February 1997; 02:53	16 February 1997; 10:04	7 h 11 min
151.	STS-82 – EVA 3	Lee and Smith completed the third spacewalk of the second Hubble repair mission by replacing a Data Interface Unit with a spare unit and replacing a reel-to-reel tape drive Engineering and Science Tape Recorder with a solid-state version. They also replaced one of the four Reaction Wheel Assembly units that helped point the telescope at targets.			
152.	STS-82 – EVA 4	(United States) Gregory J. Harbaugh (United States) Joseph R. Tanner	17 February 1997; 03:45	17 February 1997; 10:19	6 h 34 min
152.	STS-82 – EVA 4	Harbaugh and Tanner continued their Hubble repair mission by replacing the Solar Array Drive Electronics package with a spare. Then they climbed to the top of the telescope where they replaced the covers of the satellite's magnetometers. Before they finished their spacewalk, Harbaugh and Tanner installed thermal blankets over areas of degraded insulation.			
153.	STS-82 – EVA 5	(United States) Mark C. Lee (United States) Steven Smith	18 February 1997; 03:15	18 February 1997; 08:32	5 h 17 min
153.	STS-82 – EVA 5	Lee and Smith completed the repair work on Hubble by installing more thermal insulation on three more areas that had undergone degradation.			
154.	Mir PE-23 – EVA 1	(Russia) Vasily Tsibliyev (United States) Jerry Linenger	29 April 1997; 05:10	29 April 1997; 10:09	4 h 59 min
154.	Mir PE-23 – EVA 1	The spacewalk by Tsibliyev and Linenger marked the first use of the new Orlan-M space suit. Their first task was to install the Optical Properties Monitor (OPM) on the exterior of the Kristall docking module. Then the spacewalkers used the Strela crane to move to the Kvant-2 module. At Kvant-2 they retrieved two American experiments, the Partial Impact Experiment (PIE) and the Mir Sample Experiment (MSE), from Kvant-2's hull, and installed the Benton Radiation Dosimeter on Kvant-2.			
155.	Mir PE-24 – EVA 1	(Russia) Anatoly Solovyev (Russia) Pavel Vinogradov	22 August 1997; 11:14	22 August 1997; 14:30	3 h 16 min
155.	Mir PE-24 – EVA 1	Solovyev and Vinogradov conducted an internal EVA to inspect the damaged Spektr module, which had been struck by the out-of-control Progress M-34 spacecraft. They were successful in reconnecting power cabling to Spektr's solar arrays, thus restoring part of the power lost in the collision. Although the spacewalkers were able to recover equipment and supplies from the module, they were not able to find the puncture hole.			
156.	Mir PE-24 – EVA 2	(Russia) Anatoly Solovyev (United States) Michael Foale	6 September 1997; 01:07	6 September 1997; 07:07	6 h 00 min
156.	Mir PE-24 – EVA 2	Solovyev rode the Strela crane to Spektr to inspect it for damage. Foale operated the Strela from the Mir base block. Although Solovyev made an extensive documentation and search of Spektr, he was unable to find the hole created by the runaway Progress M-34 spacecraft. Before he returned to the airlock, Foale collected the radiation dosimeter installed outside earlier. Foale became the first person to conduct EVAs in both American and Russian spacesuits.			
157.	STS-86 – EVA 1	(United States) Scott Parazynski (Russia) Vladimir Titov	1 October 1997	1 October 1997	5 h 01 min
157.	STS-86 – EVA 1	Parazynski and Titov retrieved the four Mir Environmental Effects Packages (MEEP) from the docking module surface. They also installed the Solar Array Cap to the docking module, to be used to plug the hole in the Spektr module on a future EVA. To close out the EVA, the spacewalkers tested the Simplified Aid for EVA Rescue (SAFER) jet packs.			
158.	Mir PE-24 – EVA 3	(Russia) Anatoly Solovyev (Russia) Pavel Vinogradov	20 October 1997; 09:40	20 October 1997; 16:18	6 h 38 min
158.	Mir PE-24 – EVA 3	Solovyev and Vinogradov ventured inside the depressurized Spektr in an attempt to install three control cables between the solar array servo motors to the special adapter plate that seals Spektr from the rest of Mir. After cleaning up some of the debris and loose items in Spektr, Solovyev was able to connect the three cables to the servos. However, even after an effort that extended into the emergency oxygen supply of the Orlan space suits, Solovyev was only able to connect two of the cables to the adapter plate.			
159.	Mir PE-24 – EVA 4	(Russia) Anatoly Solovyev (Russia) Pavel Vinogradov	3 November 1997; 03:32	3 November 1997; 09:36	6 h 04 min
159.	Mir PE-24 – EVA 4	Solovyev and Vinogradov released a mini-satellite into orbit. The spacewalkers then dismantled an old solar panel on Kvant. They stowed the panel on the outside of the Mir base block.			
160.	Mir PE-24 – EVA 5	(Russia) Anatoly Solovyev (Russia) Pavel Vinogradov	6 November 1997; 00:12	6 November 1997; 06:24	6 h 12 min
160.	Mir PE-24 – EVA 5	Solovyev and Vinogradov installed a new solar array on Kvant to replace the panel removed on their previous spacewalk.			
161.	STS-87 – EVA 1	(United States) Winston E. Scott (Japan) Takao Doi	25 November 1997; 00:02	25 November 1997; 07:45	7 h 43 min
161.	STS-87 – EVA 1	Scott and Doi captured the Spartan satellite by hand and secured it in the payload bay. Then the spacewalking team set up and tested a crane that would be used to construct the International Space Station. Doi was the first Japanese astronaut to perform an EVA, and the first EVA performed from Space Shuttle Columbia.			
162.	STS-87 – EVA 2	(United States) Winston E. Scott (Japan) Takao Doi	3 December 1997; 09:09	3 December 1997; 14:09	4 h 59 min
162.	STS-87 – EVA 2	An extra spacewalk for Scott and Doi was added to the schedule to conduct more testing and evaluation of the crane in Columbia's payload bay. They repeated many of the same crane motion tests with smaller objects than in the earlier walk. During the EVA, a small free-flying video camera was deployed to record the work.			

=== 1998 spacewalks ===
#	Spacecraft	Spacewalkers	Start (UTC)	End (UTC)	Duration
163.	Mir PE-24 – EVA 6	(Russia) Anatoly Solovyev (Russia) Pavel Vinogradov	8 January 1998; 23:08	9 January 1998; 02:14	3 h 06 min
163.	Mir PE-24 – EVA 6	When the spacewalk began, Solovyev and Vinogradov had only planned to inspect and film the damaged airlock sealing system, but the inspection showed that repairs could be made on-the-spot. After completing the repair, the spacewalking team used the Strela boom to move across Mir and recover the American optical monitoring experiment. Before closing out the spacewalk, the team also checked the integrity of cable connections to several antennas.			
164.	Mir PE-24 – EVA 7	(Russia) Anatoly Solovyev (United States) David Wolf	14 January 1998; 21:12	15 January 1998; 01:04	3 h 52 min
164.	Mir PE-24 – EVA 7	Solovyev continued to make repairs to the airlock hatch on Kvant-2. Wolf used a handheld photo-reflectometer to inspect the exterior surface of Mir. Solovyev spent some time supervising the actions of Wolf, as the latter had never performed an EVA before. The airlock pressure check made after the spacewalk showed that Solovyev's repairs were effective.			
165.	Mir PE-25 – EVA 1	(Russia) Talgat Musabayev (Russia) Nikolai Budarin	1 April 1998; 13:35	1 April 1998; 20:15	6 h 40 min
165.	Mir PE-25 – EVA 1	In preparation for the repair of the damaged solar array, Musabayev and Budarin installed a set of handrails and one of two foot restraints on the outside of the Spektr module.			
166.	Mir PE-25 – EVA 2	(Russia) Talgat Musabayev (Russia) Nikolai Budarin	6 April 1998; 13:35	6 April 1998; 17:50	4 h 15 min
166.	Mir PE-25 – EVA 2	Musabayev and Budarin set out to repair a damaged solar panel on the Spektr module. After installing a splint on the frayed panel, they had to quickly return to the airlock to handle a problem with the station's attitude control.			
167.	Mir PE-25 – EVA 3	(Russia) Talgat Musabayev (Russia) Nikolai Budarin	11 April 1998; 09:55	11 April 1998; 16:20	6 h 25 min
167.	Mir PE-25 – EVA 3	Musabayev and Budarin removed and pushed off the external thruster engine (VDU) that had been located at the top of the Sofora boom. The team also recovered an experiment from the Rapana structure. The original plan to dismantle the Rapana structure was not completed and the structure remained in place.			
168.	Mir PE-25 – EVA 4	(Russia) Talgat Musabayev (Russia) Nikolai Budarin	17 April 1998; 07:40	17 April 1998; 14:13	6 h 33 min
168.	Mir PE-25 – EVA 4	Musabayev and Budarin removed two structures and secured them to exterior surfaces. They then repositioned the new thrust engine (VDU) for future use.			
169.	Mir PE-25 – EVA 5	(Russia) Talgat Musabayev (Russia) Nikolai Budarin	22 April 1998; 05:34	22 April 1998; 11:55	6 h 21 min
169.	Mir PE-25 – EVA 5	Musabayev and Budarin completed installation of the new VDU thruster unit on top of the Sofora boom.			
170.	Mir PE-26 – EVA 1	(Russia) Gennady Padalka (Russia) Sergei Avdeyev	15 September 1998; 20:00	15 September 1998; 20:30	0 h 30 min
170.	Mir PE-26 – EVA 1	Padalka and Avdeyev conducted an internal spacewalk in the depressurized Spektr to connect electrical and control cables to the solar array servo motor.			
171.	Mir PE-26 – EVA 2	(Russia) Gennady Padalka (Russia) Sergei Avdeyev	10 November 1998; 19:23	11 November 1998; 01:18	5 h 55 min
171.	Mir PE-26 – EVA 2	As soon as the spacewalk started, Padalka and Avdeyev deployed a mini-satellite, Spoutnik-41. The spacewalkers had a long list of experiment retrievals and deployments, which included a French "meteorite trap" intended to catch some dust from the upcoming Leonids meteor shower.			
172.	STS-88 – EVA 1	(United States) Jerry Ross (United States) James Newman	7 December 1998; 22:10	8 December 1998; 05:31	7 h 21 min
172.	STS-88 – EVA 1	Ross and Newman connected computer and electrical cables between the Unity node, the two mating adapters attached to either end of Unity, and the Zarya Functional Cargo Block (FGB).			
173.	STS-88 – EVA 2	(United States) Jerry Ross (United States) James Newman	9 December 1998; 20:33	10 December 1998; 03:35	7 h 02 min
173.	STS-88 – EVA 2	Ross and Newman installed two box-like antennas on the outside of the Unity module that were part of the station's S-band early communications system.			
174.	STS-88 – EVA 3	(United States) Jerry Ross (United States) James Newman	12 December 1998; 20:33	13 December 1998; 03:32	6 h 59 min
174.	STS-88 – EVA 3	Ross and Newman checked on an insulation cover on a cable connection on the lower Pressurized Mating Adapter (PMA 2) to ensure its proper installation, attached EVA tools on the side of Unity's upper mating adapter (PMA 1) in preparation for future EVAs, and inspected Orbiter Space Vision System targets on Unity.			

=== 1999 spacewalks ===
#	Spacecraft	Spacewalkers	Start (UTC)	End (UTC)	Duration
175.	Mir PE-27 – EVA 1	(Russia) Viktor Afanasyev (France) Jean-Pierre Haigneré	16 April 1999; 04:37	16 April 1999; 10:56	6 h 19 min
175.	Mir PE-27 – EVA 1	Afanasyev and Haigneré recovered experiments from the exterior of Mir and installed other experiments on the station's outer surface.			
176.	STS-96 – EVA 1	(United States) Tamara E. Jernigan (United States) Daniel Barry	30 May 1999; 02:56	30 May 1999; 10:51	7 h 55 min
176.	STS-96 – EVA 1	Jernigan and Barry transferred and installed two cranes from Discovery's payload bay to locations on the outside of the station. They also installed two new portable foot restraints that fit both American and Russian spacesuit boots, and attached three bags filled with tools and handrails that were used during future assembly operations.			
177.	Mir PE-27 – EVA 2	(Russia) Viktor Afanasyev (Russia) Sergei Avdeyev	23 July 1999; 11:06	23 July 1999; 17:13	6 h 07 min
177.	Mir PE-27 – EVA 2	Afanasyev and Avdeyev installed a communications antenna on the Sofora girder, but were unable to command the antenna dish to open fully. They also spent time trying to find a leak in Kvant-2. Before returning inside Mir, the spacewalkers were able to retrieve the Exobiology and Dvikon experiments.			
178.	Mir PE-27 – EVA 3	(Russia) Viktor Afanasyev (Russia) Sergei Avdeyev	28 July 1999; 09:37	28 July 1999; 14:59	5 h 22 min
178.	Mir PE-27 – EVA 3	Afanasyev and Avdeyev were successful in completing the deployment of the antenna mounted on the Sofora girder. After proving that the antenna could fully open, the antenna was disconnected and pushed into space. The spacewalking team also installed the experiments indicator and Sprut-4 on the exterior, traded out data cassettes on the Migmas ion spectrometer, and then recovered the Danko-M and the Ekran-D experiments for return to Earth.			
179.	STS-103 – EVA 1	(United States) Steven Smith (United States) John Grunsfeld	22 December 1999; 18:54	23 December 1999; 03:09	8 h 15 min
179.	STS-103 – EVA 1	Smith and Grunsfeld replaced six of Hubble's gyroscopes and installed six Voltage/Temperature Improvement Kits during one of the longest spacewalks on record. A planned activity to grease the door hinges was deferred to the next day's spacewalk.			
180.	STS-103 – EVA 2	(United States) Michael Foale (Switzerland) Claude Nicollier	23 December 1999; 19:06	24 December 1999; 03:16	8 h 10 min
180.	STS-103 – EVA 2	Foale and Nicollier replaced the main computer on Hubble with a new, faster machine. They also swapped out one of Hubble's three Fine Guidance Sensors for a refurbished one that had been previously removed from Hubble and serviced on Earth.			
181.	STS-103 – EVA 3	(United States) Steven Smith (United States) John Grunsfeld	24 December 1999; 19:17	25 December 1999; 03:25	8 h 08 min
181.	STS-103 – EVA 3	Smith and Grunsfeld replaced a radio transmitter that had failed on Hubble in the previous year. They also replaced a data tape recorder with a solid-state recorder and added some insulation to the outer surface of Hubble.			

For spacewalks that took place from 2000 through 2014, see List of spacewalks 2000–2014. For spacewalks that took place from the beginning of 2015 on, see List of spacewalks since 2015.

== Commemorative stamps ==
The first spacewalk, that of the Soviet cosmonaut Alexei Leonov was commemorated in several Eastern Bloc stamps (see the stamps section in the Alexei Leonov article). Since the Soviet Union did not distribute diagrams or images of the Voskhod 2 spacecraft at the time, the spaceship depiction in the stamps was purely fictional. In 1967 the U.S. Post Office issued a pair of postage stamps commemorating the first American to float freely in space while orbiting the Earth. The engraved image has accurate depictions of the Gemini IV spacecraft and the space suit worn by astronaut Ed White.

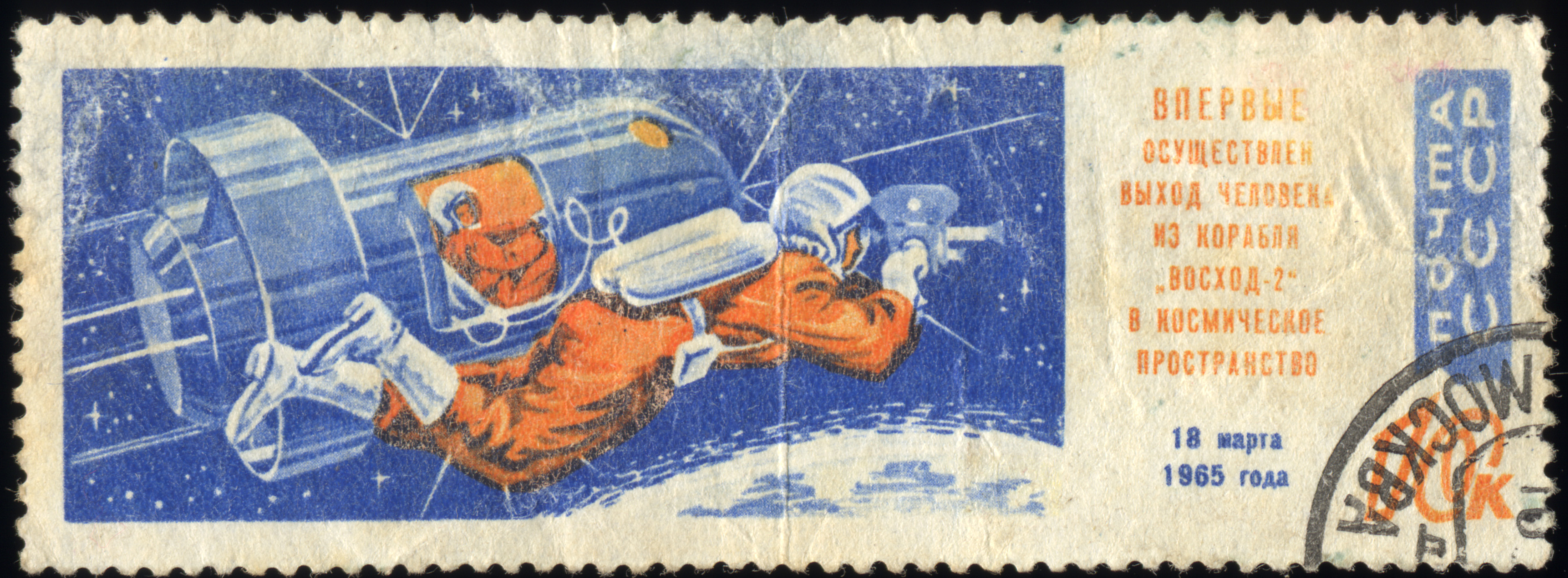
Alexei Leonov, Voskhod 2, First Spacewalk U.S.S.R. commemorative issue of 1965

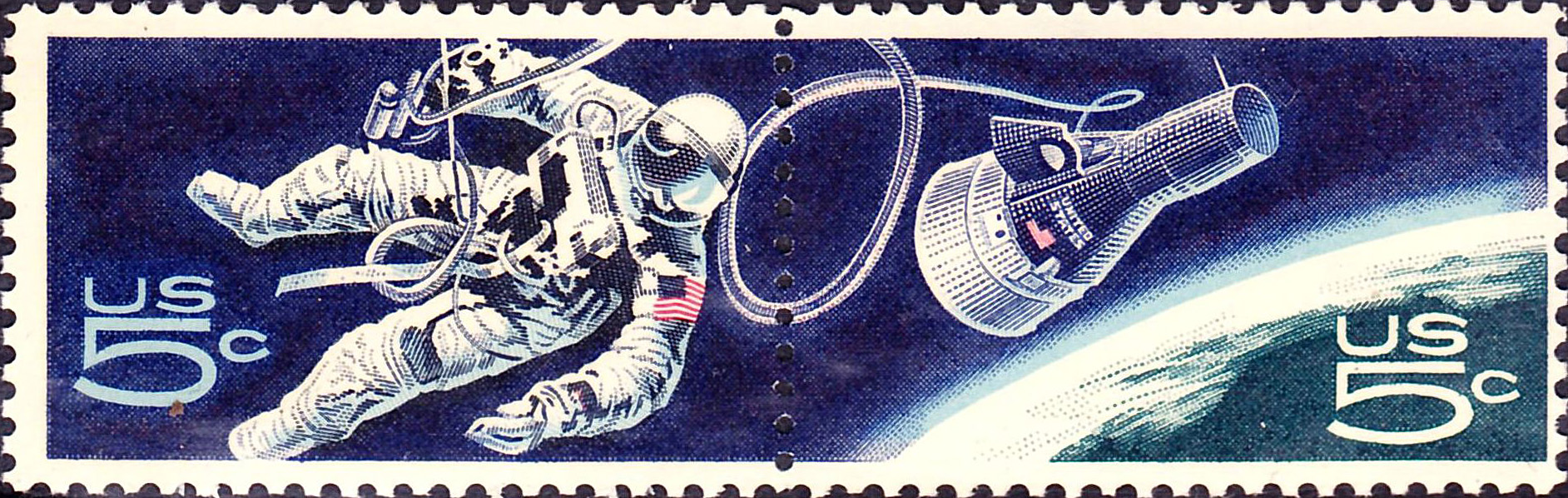
Accomplishments in Space U.S. commemorative issue of 1967

Two Forever Stamps were issued in 2019 to commemorate the first spacewalk's 50th anniversary. One features an iconic image of Buzz Aldrin performing an EVA, and the other an image of the Moon as viewed from Apollo 11 in space.

== See also ==
- Lists of spacewalks and moonwalks
- List of spacewalkers
- List of cumulative spacewalk records
- Space capsule
- Space exploration
- Space suit
- U.S. space exploration history on U.S. stamps
