= Space system =

Space system may refer to:

- Spaceflight system, consisting of the space segment, ground segment, and sometimes user segment
- Space Systems Center, a generic name for NASA
- Space Systems Laboratory (SSL), one of many laboratories in university aerospace engineering departments
- Space Systems/Loral (SS/L), a manufacturing subsidiary of Loral Space & Communications
- Space radio system, any group of cooperating earth stations and/or space radio stations employing space radiocommunication
