= EASE/ACCESS =

Pair of Space Shuttle flight experiments

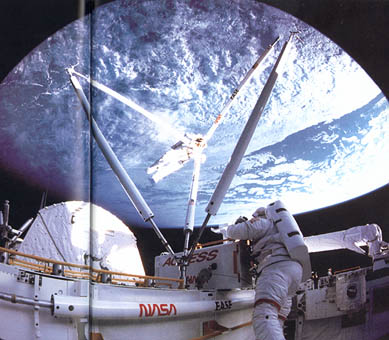
Astronauts assemble the EASE structure during STS-61B.

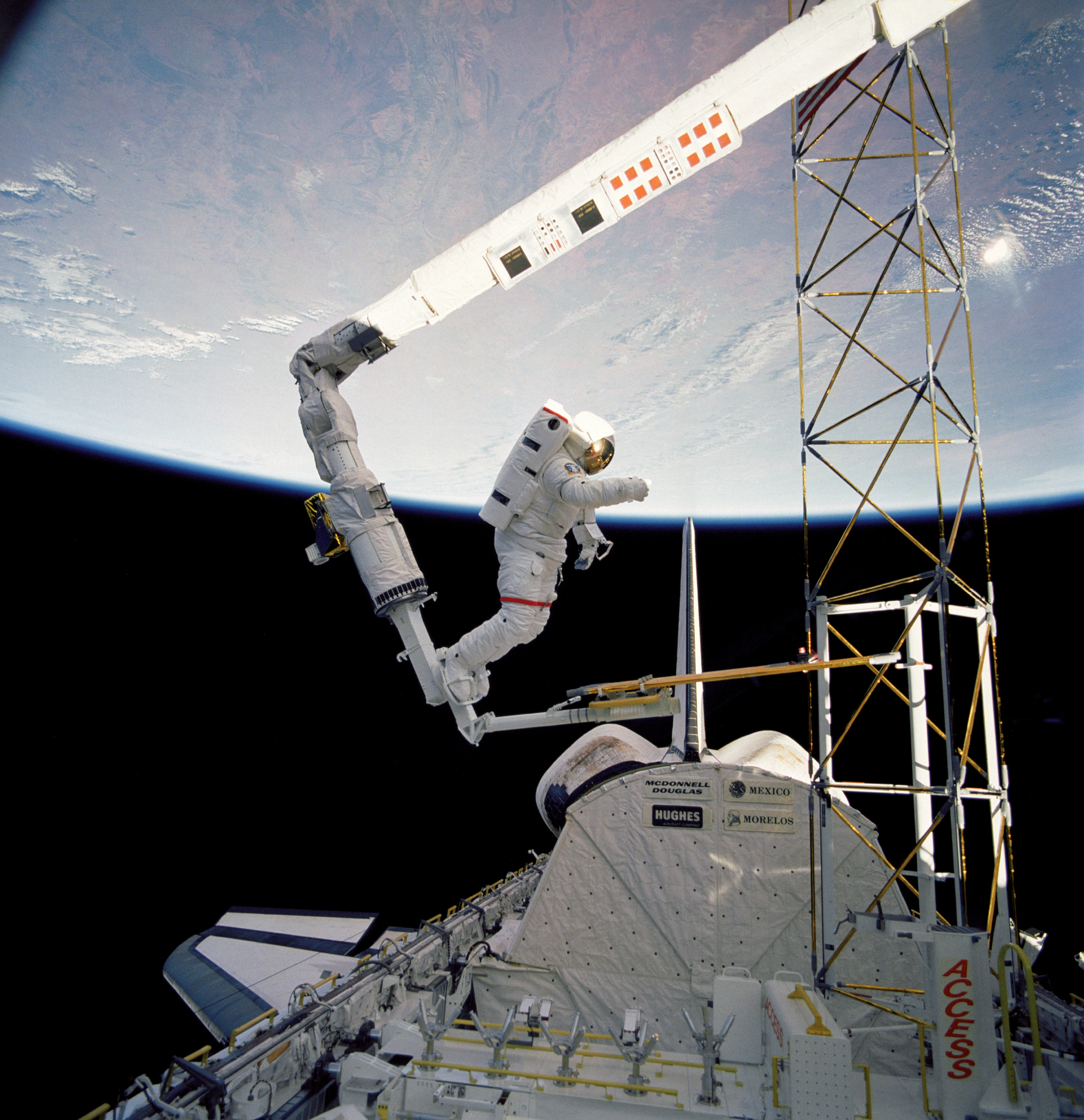
Astronaut Jerry L. Ross, secured to the RMS, approaches the ACCESS structure during STS-61B.

The Experimental Assembly of Structures in EVA and the Assembly Concept for Construction of Erectable Space Structures, or EASE/ACCESS, were a pair of space shuttle flight experiments that were performed on STS-61-B, on November 29 and December 1, 1985. The purpose of the experiments was to study how quickly astronauts would become proficient at assembling space structures during extravehicular activity, and how quickly they would become fatigued, and to explore various construction and maintenance techniques. In particular, researchers studied the applied moments of inertia arising in the manual assembly of a large space structure.

EASE was a project of NASA's Marshall Space Flight Center and the Space Systems Laboratory at the Massachusetts Institute of Technology (later at the University of Maryland), while ACCESS was developed by NASA's Langley Research Center.

== Experiment and EVAs ==
Astronauts Jerry L. Ross and Sherwood C. Spring repeatedly assembled a 3.7-meter (12 ft) tetrahedral truss (EASE) and a triangular column truss (ACCESS) during two extra-vehicular activities (EVAs). The first EVA was devoted to studying human performance in assembly techniques, while the second was dedicated to supplementary experiments, including alternative construction techniques and maintenance scenarios.

The EASE structure consisted of six identical aluminum beams, each 12 feet (3.7 m) long and with a mass of 64 pounds (29 kg), connected by four nodal joints. ACCESS consisted of 93 tubular aluminum struts, each 1-inch (25 mm) in diameter—thirty-three 4.5 feet (1.4 m) struts, and sixty 6 feet (1.8 m) struts—connected by thirty-three nodal joints. While assembling the EASE structure, the astronauts moved about the structure under their own power. For the assembly of the ACCESS structure, the astronauts were secured to a mobile platform on the Remote Manipulator System, which was guided by astronaut Mary L. Cleave.

A stereoscopic camera system recorded the movements of the structural beams during assembly. Taking into account the effects of inertia, drag, and virtual mass, researchers used this data to reconstruct the applied moments of inertia. The structure was also assembled in neutral buoyancy simulation, and the two environments were compared. The EVAs were also recorded by an IMAX camera mounted in the shuttle cargo bay.

== Results ==
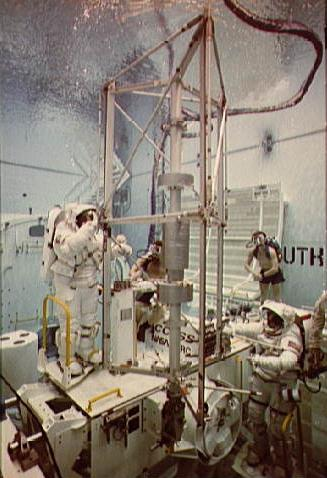
Astronauts assemble the ACCESS structure in neutral buoyancy training.

Applied moments of inertia during EVA were found to be on the order of 2.0 newton-meters (1.5 lbf⋅ft). In neutral buoyancy simulation, the applied moments of inertia were around five times greater than those during EVA. Assembly time during EVA was around 20% less than in neutral buoyancy simulation. The learning curve was on the order of 78%, and was unaffected by the strength, coordination, or size of the astronaut, or the fit of the space suit. In both environments, moments of inertia were applied as short impulses, interspersed by several seconds of coasting.

== Conclusion ==
The EASE/ACCESS experiments were deemed to be successful. The information gathered provided a basis for planning future manually assembled space structures, and in the process NASA accrued valuable EVA assembly experience. The team responsible for the EASE project was awarded a NASA Group Achievement Award.

== See also ==
- List of spacewalks and moonwalks 1965–1999
- Space Shuttle program
- Human factors
