= Spektr =

Module on the Mir Space Station

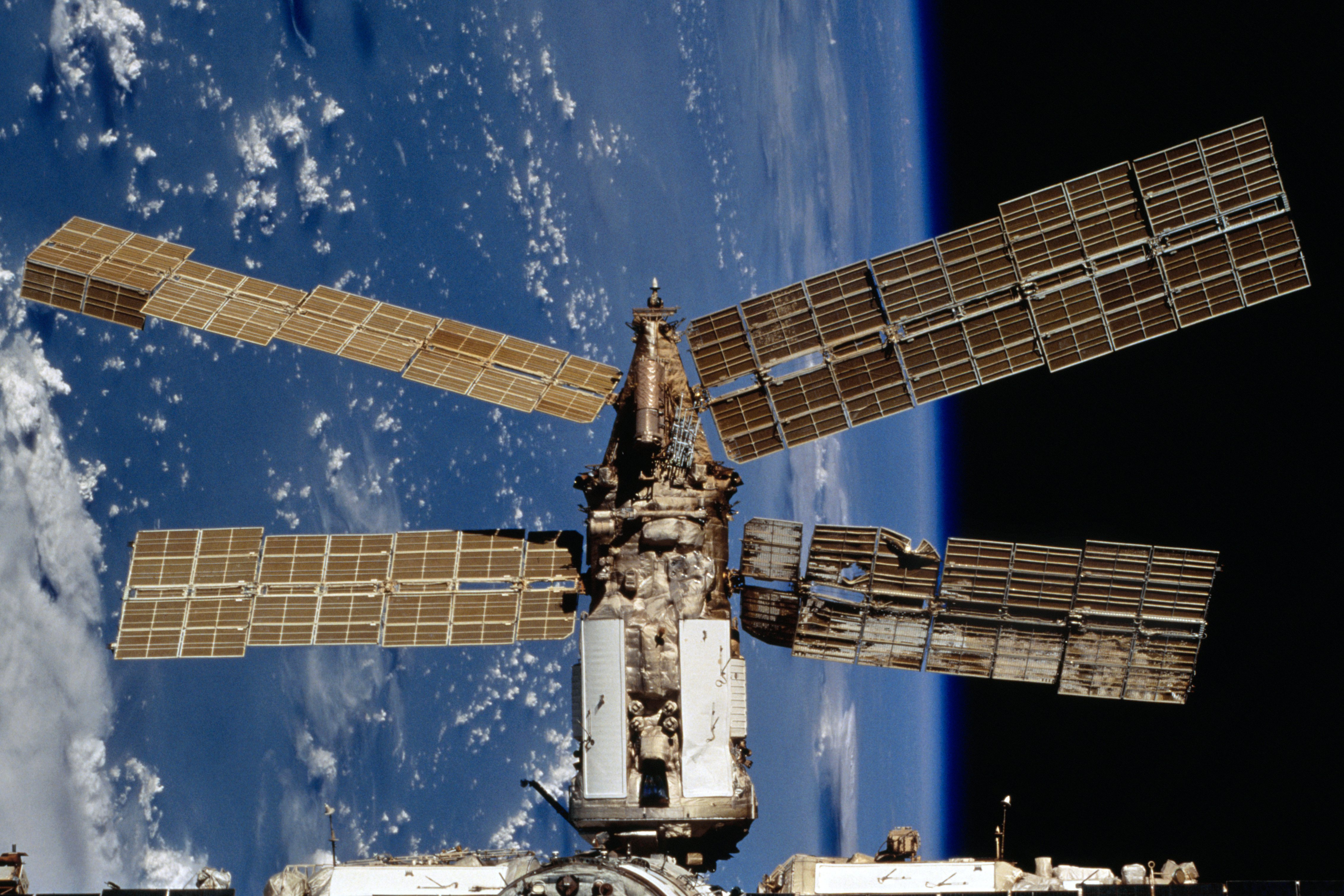
- Spektr, after the collision with Progress M-34.

Module statistics
- COSPAR ID: 1995-024A
- Part of: Mir
- Launch date: May 20, 1995 (UTC)
- Docked: June 1, 1995 (UTC)
- Reentry: March 23, 2001 (UTC)
- Mass: 19,640 kg (43,300 lb)
- Length: 9.1 m (30 ft)
- Diameter: 4.35 m (14.3 ft)
- Pressurised volume: 62 m^{3} (2,200 cu ft)

Configuration
- Diagram of Spektr

Spektr (Russian: Спектр; English: Spectrum) (TKM-O, 77KSO, 11F77O) was the fifth module of the Mir Space Station. It was designed for remote observation of Earth's environment and contained atmospheric and surface research equipment. Spektr had four solar arrays which generated about half of the station's electrical power. In 1997, Spektr was damaged when a Progress hit the module, forcing its closure.

== Development ==
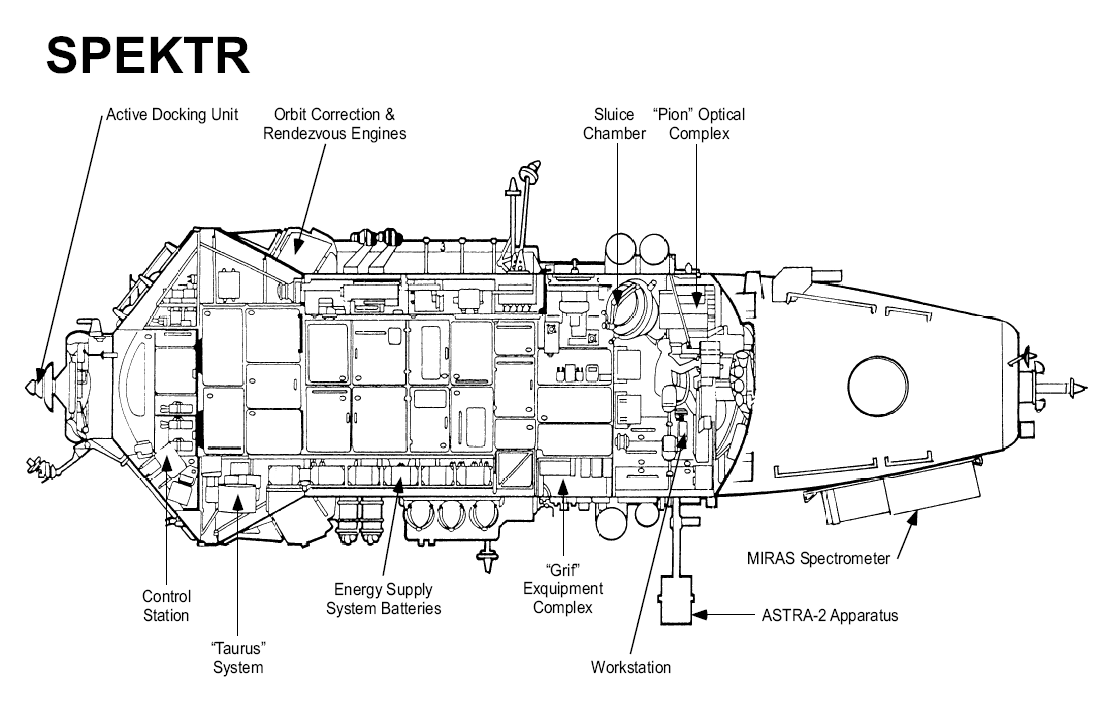
Cut-away view of Spektr

The Spektr module was originally developed as part of a top-secret military program code-named "Oktant". It was planned to carry experiments with space-borne surveillance and test antimissile defense. The surveillance instruments were mounted on the exterior of the module opposite the docking port. Also in this location were two launchers for artificial targets. The heart of the Spektr payload was an experimental optical telescope code-named "Pion” (Peony).

== Details ==
Spektr carried scientific instruments to monitor radiation, measure cloud altitudes and atmospheric constituents on Earth, and to detect interstellar gases. These experiments would have been a continuation of the research aboard a top-secret TKS-M module, which docked to Salyut 7 in 1985. However, with the end of the Cold War and the shrinking of Russia's space budget, the module was stuck on the ground.

In the mid-1990s with the return of US-Russian cooperation in space, NASA agreed to provide funds to complete the Spektr and Priroda modules in exchange for having 600 to 700 kg of US experiments installed. The Oktava military component was replaced with a conical mounting area for two additional solar arrays. The airlock for the Oktava targets to be used instead to expose experiments to the vacuum of space.

Once in orbit, Spektr served as the living quarters for American astronauts until the collision in late June 1997.

== Collision ==
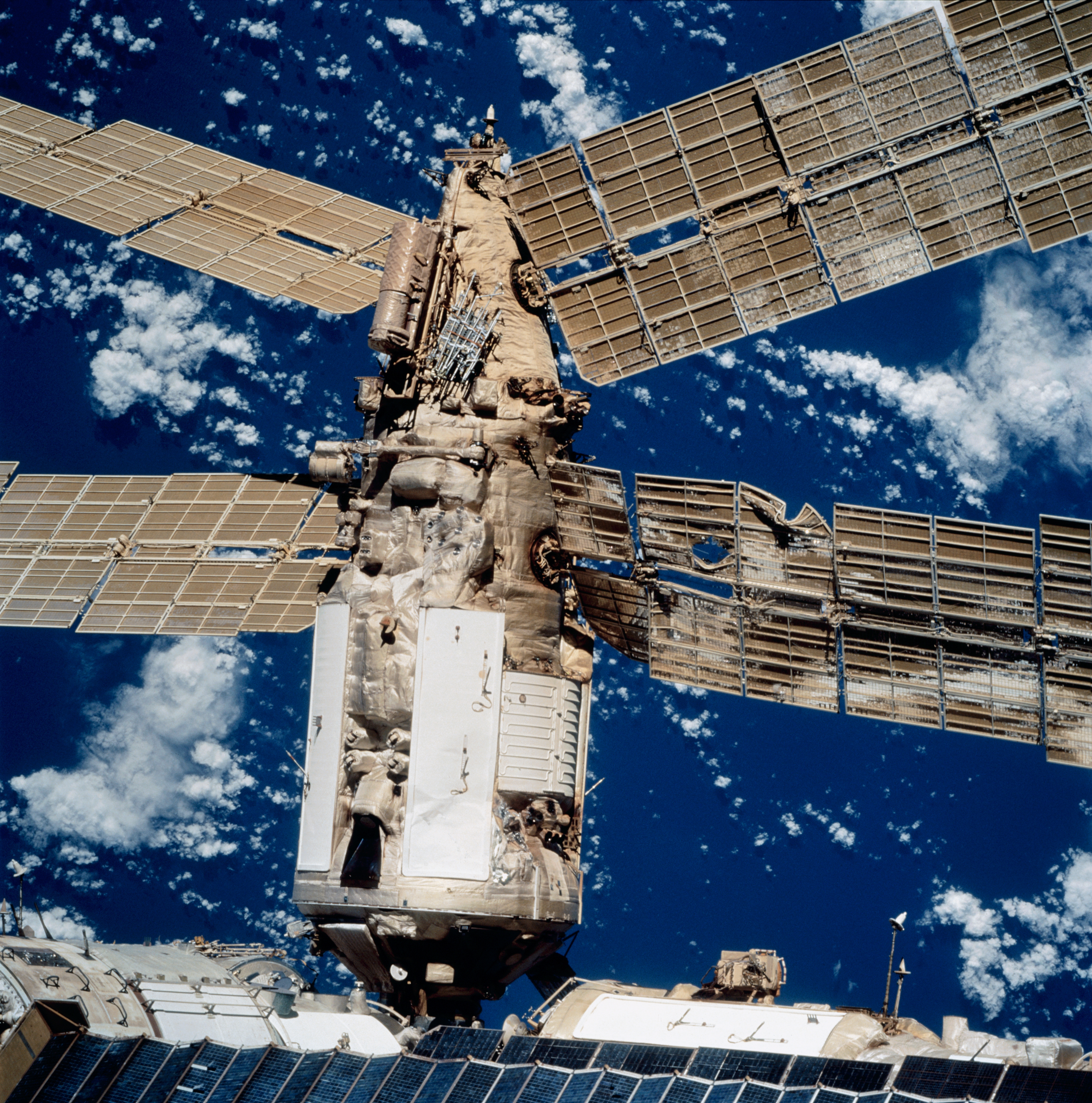
Damaged solar arrays on Spektr module following a collision with an uncrewed Progress spacecraft in September 1997. The collision caused a depressurization that was halted by closing the hatch to Spektr.

On June 25, 1997, the Progress M-34 spacecraft crashed into Spektr while doing an experimental docking maneuver with the Kvant-1 module. The collision damaged one of Spektr's solar arrays and punctured the hull, causing a relatively slow leak. The crew had enough time to install a hatch cover and seal the module off to prevent depressurization of the entire Mir station. To seal the module, the crew had to remove the cables that were routed through the (open) hatchway, including the power cables from Spektr's solar panels.

An internal spacewalk in the Spektr module in August 1997 by cosmonauts Anatoly Solovyov and Pavel Vinogradov, from Soyuz TM-26, succeeded in restoring these power connections by installing a modified hatch cover to allow the power cables to pass through the hatch when it was in the closed position. In a second internal spacewalk in October they connected two of the panels to a computer system to allow the panels to be controlled remotely and align with the Sun. These modifications allowed power generation to return to approximately 70% of the pre-collision generation capability.

Spektr was left depressurized and isolated from the remainder of the Mir complex.
