= Sherwood C. Spring =

American astronaut (born 1944)

Sherwood Spring
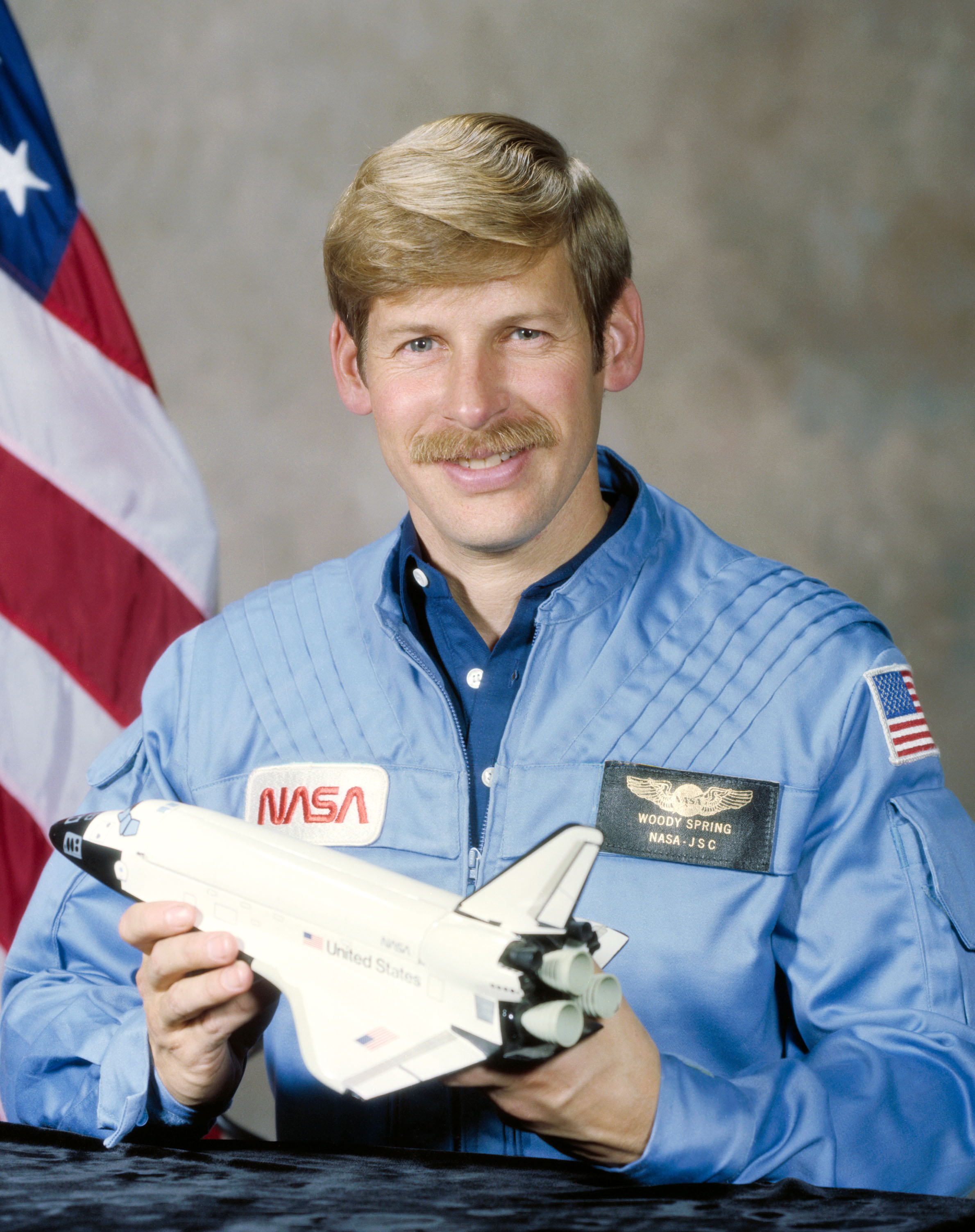
- Born: Sherwood Clark Spring; September 3, 1944 (age 82); Hartford, Connecticut, U.S.
- Education: United States Military Academy (BS); University of Arizona (MS)
- Space career

NASA astronaut
- Rank: Colonel, USA
- Time in space: 6d 21h 4m
- Selection: NASA Group 9 (1980)
- Total EVAs: 2
- Total EVA time: 12h 14m
- Missions: STS-61-B

Sherwood Clark "Woody" Spring (born September 3, 1944) is a retired United States Army colonel and former NASA astronaut. Spring is married with two children. He is the father of United States Olympian Justin Spring. Sherwood Spring has logged 165 hours in space, 12 of which were spent conducting spacewalks. Spring has also accumulated 3,500 hours in 25 different military and civilian aircraft; over 1,500 of those hours were spent in jet aircraft.

== Personal life ==
Spring was active in the Boy Scouts of America where he achieved its second highest rank, Life Scout. Spring met his future wife, Debbie Cooper (an elementary school physical education teacher), while they were both students at the University of Arizona.

Spring's son, Justin, was a member of the 2008 US Olympic Men's Gymnastics team that earned bronze in Beijing, was the men's gymnastics head coach at the University of Illinois for 12 seasons and currently an assistant coach at the University of Alabama.

== Education ==
Graduated from Ponaganset High School (North Scituate, Rhode Island) in 1963; received a Bachelor of Science degree in General Engineering from the United States Military Academy in 1967 and a Master of Science degree in Aerospace Engineering from the University of Arizona in 1974. Graduated from the United States Naval Test Pilot School in 1976 and the Defense Systems Management College in 1989.

== Organizations ==
Member of the Society of Experimental Test Pilots, Association of the United States Army, Association of Space Explorers (ASE), and a lifetime member of the Association of Graduates of the United States Military Academy.

== Special honors ==
Defense Distinguished Service Medal, Distinguished Flying Cross, 2 Bronze Stars, Meritorious Service Medal, 3 Army Commendation Medals, 9 Air Medals, a Vietnam Cross of Gallantry with Palm, National Defense Service Medal, Vietnam Service Medals, and NASA Space Flight Medal. Recipient in 1986 of two honorary doctorate degrees: a Doctor of Science, and one Doctor of Humane Letters. In 1989, Spring was recipient of a second honorary Doctor of Science degree.

Recipient of the Victor A. Prather Award in 1985 for performance during an EVA.

== Experience ==
After graduation from West Point in 1967, Spring served two tours of duty in Vietnam. The first was from 1968 to 1969 with the 101st Airborne Division. The second tour, 1970–1971, came immediately after flight school, where he served as a helicopter pilot with the 1st Cavalry Division. Upon return, he received fixed wing training en route to a master's degree program with the University of Arizona in 1974. After a short tour at Edwards Air Force Base, California as a flight test engineer, he attended the U.S. Naval Test Pilot School at NAS Patuxent River, Maryland. He then returned to the army's Flight Test Facility at Edwards AFB to complete four years as an experimental test pilot.

He has military and civilian experience in 25 types of airplanes and helicopters and has logged more than 3,500 hours flying time—including over 1,500 hours in jet aircraft.

== NASA career ==
Spring was selected as an astronaut in May 1980. His technical assignments have included software verification at the Shuttle Avionics Integration Laboratory and Flight Simulation Laboratory; vehicle and satellite integration at the Kennedy Space Center, Florida, for STS-5, 6, 7, 8, and 9; Astronaut Office EVA (Extra-vehicular activity) expert; and Space Station construction, EVA maintenance, and design. Spring served as a mission specialist on STS-61-B which flew November 26, 1985, through December 3, 1985. During that mission, he was responsible for launching three communications satellites and performed two EVAs. During the EVAs, which totaled more than 12 hours, Spring investigated Space Station construction techniques, large structure manipulation while on the end of the remote arm, and a time and motion study for comparison between Earth training and space performance, with the EASE/ACCESS experiment. With the completion of STS-61-B, he has logged a total of 165 hours in space. After the Space Shuttle Challenger accident, Spring participated in the Kennedy Space Center Tiger Team for accident investigation, then led the Astronaut Office EVA (Extra Vehicle Activity) program until 1988.

== Post-NASA career ==
Following his retirement from NASA in August 1988, Spring spent the next five years directing the Army Space Program Office in Washington, D.C. He retired from the army in July 1994, and worked as a contractor on Defense and Intelligence programs in the Washington, D.C. area. He is currently a professor at the Defense Acquisition University (DAU) and lives in San Diego, California.
