= Space Systems Laboratory =

Space Systems Laboratory is a name commonly used by university laboratories engaged in the research of technologies used for human activities in space.

Examples include:

- Drexel Space Systems Laboratory at the Drexel University in Philadelphia, Pennsylvania, US
- Space Systems Laboratory at the Embry-Riddle Aeronautical University in Prescott, AZ, USA
- Space Systems Laboratory (MIT) at the Massachusetts Institute of Technology in Cambridge, Massachusetts, US
  - this lab was formed at MIT in 1995, after another with the same name moved to UMD
- Space Systems Laboratory at the Tokyo Metropolitan University in Tokyo, Japan
- Space Systems Laboratory at the University of Kentucky in Lexington, KY, USA
- Space Systems Laboratory (Maryland) at the University of Maryland in College Park, MD, USA
  - this lab was originally founded at MIT in 1976 and moved to UMD in 1990
- Space Systems Laboratory at the University of Michigan in Ann Arbor, MI, USA
- Space Systems Laboratory at the University of Pisa in Pisa, Italy
- Space Systems Laboratory at the University of Sheffield in Sheffield, England, UK
