= List of Mir spacewalks =

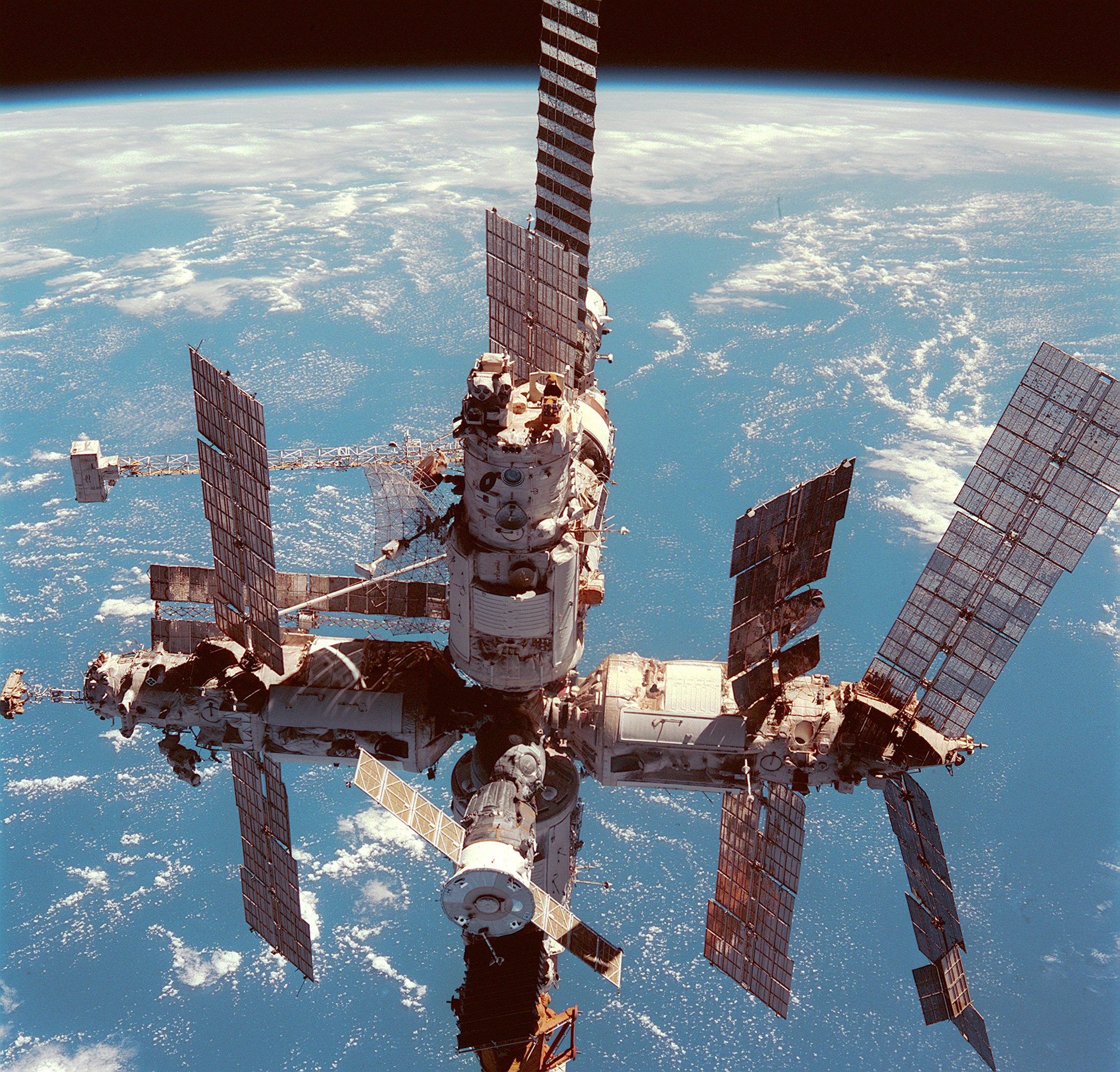
A view of Mir on 12 June 1998 as seen from the departing Space Shuttle Discovery during STS-91

Mir (Russian: Мир, IPA: [ˈmʲir]; lit. Peace or World) was a Soviet and later Russian space station, operational in low Earth orbit from 1986 to 2001. With a mass greater than that of any previous space station, Mir was constructed from 1986 to 1996 with a modular design, the first to be assembled in this way. The station was the largest artificial satellite orbiting the Earth until its deorbit on 21 March 2001, a record now surpassed by the International Space Station (ISS). Mir served as a microgravity research laboratory in which crews conducted experiments in biology, human biology, physics, astronomy, meteorology and spacecraft systems in order to develop technologies required for the permanent occupation of space.

Following the success of the Salyut programme, Mir represented the next stage in the Soviet Union's space station programme. The first module of the station, known as the core module or base block, was launched in 1986, and was followed by six further modules (Kvant-1 (1987), Kvant-2 (1989), Kristall (1990), Spektr (1995), the docking module (1995) and Priroda (1996)), all launched by Proton rockets (with the exception of the docking module). When complete, the station consisted of seven pressurised modules and several unpressurised components. Power was provided by several solar arrays mounted directly on the modules. The station was maintained at an orbit between 296 km (184 mi) and 421 km (262 mi) altitude and travelled at an average speed of 27,700 km/h (17,200 mph), completing 15.7 Earth orbits per day.

Spacewalks (Extra-vehicular activities, or EVAs) in support of the operation of the station were major events in the assembly and maintenance of the orbital laboratory. EVAs were performed to install new components onto the station, to repair and replace various experiments, systems and equipment, and to install, monitor and retrieve scientific experiments. The first EVA carried out at Mir was held on 11 April 1987, when EO-2 crewmembers Yury Romanenko and Aleksandr Laveykin assisted in the docking of the Kvant-1 module. The longest EVA was performed on 17 July 1990, when EO-6 crewmembers Anatoly Solovyev and Aleksandr Balandin left the station to repair their spacecraft, Soyuz TM-9, then encountered difficulties shutting the airlock hatch upon their return. The total time for that spacewalk was seven hours and sixteen minutes, close to the absolute limit of their Orlan-DMA spacesuits.

In total, eighty EVAs were conducted around Mir from 1987 to 2000. Sixty-three EVAs were conducted from Kvant-2's airlock, fifteen from the core module's docking node (of which three were so-called 'intravehicular activities', or IVAs, within Spektr), and two from the airlock of the Space Shuttle Atlantis.

† denotes EVAs performed from the core module's docking node.
‡ denotes EVAs performed from the airlock of the Space Shuttle Atlantis.
All other EVAs were performed from the airlock in Kvant-2.
EVAs conducted during different principal expeditions (EO, Russian: экспедиция основная, lit. mission primary) are separated by a wide blue line. Space Shuttle missions (STS) are not separated from the expedition during which they took place.

#	Mission	Spacewalkers	Start (UTC)	End (UTC)	Duration
1	EO-2; EVA 1 †	Yury Romanenko; Aleksandr Laveykin	11 April 1987; 19:41	11 April 1987; 23:21	3 hours, 40 minutes
1	EO-2; EVA 1 †	Inspected the rear port of the core module following the failure of Kvant-1 to achieve a successful hard docking on 9 April and discovered a piece of debris left behind following the departure of Progress 28 on 27 March. This was removed, and the subsequent hard docking of the new module was observed.			
2	EO-2; EVA 2 †	Yury Romanenko; Aleksandr Laveykin	12 June 1987; 16:55	12 June 1987; 18:48	1-hour, 53 minutes
2	EO-2; EVA 2 †	Installed the first part of a new solar array, delivered by Kvant-1, into a motor mount on the dorsal surface of the core module.			
3	EO-2; EVA 3 †	Yury Romanenko; Aleksandr Laveykin	16 June 1987; 15:30	16 June 1987; 18:45	3 hours, 15 minutes
3	EO-2; EVA 3 †	Installed the second part of the new solar array on the core module, installed the array's power cables and affixed sample exposure cassettes to the exterior of the station.			
4	EO-3; EVA 1 †	Vladimir Titov; Musa Manarov	26 February 1988; 09:00	26 February 1988; 13:25	4 hours, 25 minutes
4	EO-3; EVA 1 †	Replaced a segment of the core module's dorsal solar array with a new one which produced telemetry to allow the gradual degradation in the efficiency of the array to be monitored and inspected the exterior of the station.			
5	EO-3; EVA 2 †	Vladimir Titov; Musa Manarov	30 June 1988; 05:33	30 June 1988; 10:43	5 hours, 10 minutes
5	EO-3; EVA 2 †	Began repair of an X-ray telescope on Kvant-1 by opening the thermal insulation covering it and exposing the part requiring replacement. Repair was halted after the tool designed to remove the failed part from the telescope broke.			
6	EO-3; EVA 3 †	Vladimir Titov; Musa Manarov	20 October 1988; 05:59	20 October 1988; 10:11	4 hours, 12 minutes
6	EO-3; EVA 3 †	Completed the repair of the X-ray telescope begun on the previous EVA and affixed a mount near the core module's docking node for the French Era experiment. First use of new Orlan-DMA spacesuit.			
7	EO-4; EVA 1 †	Alexander Volkov; Jean-Loup Chrétien	9 December 1988; 09:57	9 December 1988; 15:57	6 hours, 0 minutes
7	EO-4; EVA 1 †	Installed French Echantillon exposure cassette and deployed, tested & jettisoned French Era truss experiment.			
8	EO-5; EVA 1 †	Alexander Viktorenko; Aleksandr Serebrov	8 January 1990; 20:23	8 January 1990; 23:19	2 hours, 56 minutes
8	EO-5; EVA 1 †	Installed two star trackers on the exterior of Kvant-1 to assist the station's attitude control.			
9	EO-5; EVA 2 †	Alexander Viktorenko; Aleksandr Serebrov	11 January 1990; 18:01	11 January 1990; 20:55	2 hours, 54 minutes
9	EO-5; EVA 2 †	Retrieved the Echantillon cassette, dismantled the Era mount, installed exposure cassettes on the exterior of the station and reconfigured the docking apparatus in the core module's docking node in preparation for the arrival of Kristall.			
10	EO-5; EVA 3	Alexander Viktorenko; Aleksandr Serebrov	26 January 1990; 12:09	26 January 1990; 15:11	3 hours, 2 minutes
10	EO-5; EVA 3	First EVA from Kvant-2's airlock. Affixed a mount just outside the airlock for the Ikar cosmonaut manoeuvring unit, dismantled the module's now redundant Kurs antenna, installed exposure cassettes and erected Kvant-2's scan platform.			
11	EO-5; EVA 4	Alexander Viktorenko; Aleksandr Serebrov	1 February 1990; 08:15	1 February 1990; 13:14	4 hours, 59 minutes
11	EO-5; EVA 4	First test of the Ikar cosmonaut manoeuvring unit.			
12	EO-5; EVA 5	Alexander Viktorenko; Aleksandr Serebrov	5 February 1990; 06:08	5 February 1990; 09:53	3 hours, 45 minutes
12	EO-5; EVA 5	Second test of the Ikar cosmonaut manoeuvring unit.			
13	EO-6; EVA 1	Anatoly Solovyev; Aleksandr Balandin	17 July 1990; 13:06	17 July 1990; 20:22	7 hours, 16 minutes
13	EO-6; EVA 1	Conducted repairs to the insulation of the damaged Soyuz TM-9. Found that the airlock hatch was damaged and would not shut when the EVA was concluded, so the back-up secondary airlock in Kvant-2 was used.			
14	EO-6; EVA 2	Anatoly Solovyev; Aleksandr Balandin	26 July 1990; 11:15	26 July 1990; 14:46	3 hours, 31 minutes
14	EO-6; EVA 2	Inspected airlock hatch, stowed equipment used during the repair of Soyuz TM-9 on the previous EVA, and managed, with a great deal of manual effort, to close the damaged airlock hatch.			
15	EO-7; EVA 1	Gennadi Manakov; Gennadi Strekalov	30 October 1990; 21:45	31 October 1990; 01:33	3 hours, 48 minutes
15	EO-7; EVA 1	Attempted to repair the damaged Kvant-2 airlock hatch, discovered that the hinge required replacement.			
16	EO-8; EVA 1	Viktor Afanasyev; Musa Manarov	7 January 1991; 17:03	7 January 1991; 22:21	5 hours, 18 minutes
16	EO-8; EVA 1	Conducted successful repair of Kvant-2's airlock hatch, affixed a mount onto the core module, retrieved exposure cassettes and removed a camera from Kvant-2's scan platform.			
17	EO-8; EVA 2	Viktor Afanasyev; Musa Manarov	23 January 1991; 10:59	23 January 1991; 16:32	5 hours, 33 minutes
17	EO-8; EVA 2	Installed a Strela crane on the mount affixed on the previous EVA and retrieved exposure cassettes.			
18	EO-8; EVA 3	Viktor Afanasyev; Musa Manarov	26 January 1991; 09:00	26 January 1991; 15:20	6 hours, 20 minutes
18	EO-8; EVA 3	Affixed two mounts to Kvant-1 in preparation for the relocation of Kristall's solar arrays, set up a laser rangefinder on Kristall for use by Buran shuttles and installed the Sprut-5 spectrometer on the exterior of Kvant-2.			
19	EO-8; EVA 4	Viktor Afanasyev; Musa Manarov	25 April 1991; 20:29	26 April 1991; 00:03	3 hours, 34 minutes
19	EO-8; EVA 4	Inspected a faulty Kurs antenna on Kvant-1, retrieved exposure cassettes, replaced the camera removed on their first EVA from Kvant-2's scan platform and tested a prototype thermomechanical joint near the airlock.			
20	EO-9; EVA 1	Anatoly Artsebarsky; Sergei Krikalev	24 June 1991; 21:11	25 June 1991; 02:09	4 hours, 58 minutes
20	EO-9; EVA 1	Repaired the broken Kurs antenna on Kvant-1 and installed a prototype thermomechanical joint.			
21	EO-9; EVA 2	Anatoly Artsebarsky; Sergei Krikalev	28 June 1991; 19:02	28 June 1991; 22:26	3 hours, 24 minutes
21	EO-9; EVA 2	Installed the University of California's TREK cosmic ray detector on Kvant-2 and retrieved the prototype thermomechanical joint installed on the previous EVA.			
22	EO-9; EVA 3	Anatoly Artsebarsky; Sergei Krikalev	15 July 1991; 11:45	15 July 1991; 17:41	5 hours, 56 minutes
22	EO-9; EVA 3	Installed a work platform on Kvant-1 in preparation for the installation of the Sofora truss.			
23	EO-9; EVA 4	Anatoly Artsebarsky; Sergei Krikalev	19 July 1991; 11:10	19 July 1991; 16:38	5 hours, 28 minutes
23	EO-9; EVA 4	Installed the base plate and first three segments of the Sofora truss on Kvant-1.			
24	EO-9; EVA 5	Anatoly Artsebarsky; Sergei Krikalev	23 July 1991; 09:15	23 July 1991; 14:57	5 hours, 42 minutes
24	EO-9; EVA 5	Continued the assembly of the Sofora truss on Kvant-1.			
25	EO-9; EVA 6	Anatoly Artsebarsky; Sergei Krikalev	27 July 1991; 08:44	27 July 1991; 15:33	6 hours, 49 minutes
25	EO-9; EVA 6	Completed the assembly of the Sofora truss on Kvant-1 and raised the Soviet flag on the far end.			
26	EO-10; EVA 1	Alexander Volkov; Sergei Krikalev	20 February 1992; 20:09	21 February 1992; 00:21	4 hours, 12 minutes
26	EO-10; EVA 1	First EVA conducted following the collapse of the USSR. Retrieved the work platform installed on Kvant-1 prior to the construction of the Sofora truss, cleaned a TV camera lens on Kvant-1, retrieved the telemetered panel from the core module's dorsal solar array and retrieved exposure cassettes from around Kvant-2's airlock. During the initial stages of the EVA, the heat exchanger in Volkov's spacesuit failed and he relied on an umbilical from Kvant-2 for life support for the rest of the EVA.			
27	EO-11; EVA 1	Aleksandr Viktorenko; Aleksandr Kaleri	8 July 1992; 12:38	8 July 1992; 14:41	2 hours, 3 minutes
27	EO-11; EVA 1	Installed two new gyrodynes on Kvant-2.			
28	EO-12; EVA 1	Anatoly Solovyev; Sergei Avdeyev	3 September 1992; 13:32	3 September 1992; 17:28	3 hours, 56 minutes
28	EO-12; EVA 1	Prepared the Sofora truss and Progress M-14 for the installation of the VDU thruster block.			
29	EO-12; EVA 2	Anatoly Solovyev; Sergei Avdeyev	7 September 1992; 11:47	7 September 1992; 16:55	5 hours, 8 minutes
29	EO-12; EVA 2	Configured the VDU thruster for installation, installed the thruster's umbilical on the Sofora truss and removed the Soviet flag from the truss.			
30	EO-12; EVA 3	Anatoly Solovyev; Sergei Avdeyev	11 September 1992; 10:06	11 September 1992; 15:50	5 hours, 44 minutes
30	EO-12; EVA 3	Completed the installation of the VDU thruster block on the Sofora truss.			
31	EO-12; EVA 4	Anatoly Solovyev; Sergei Avdeyev	15 September 1992; 07:49	15 September 1992; 11:22	3 hours, 33 minutes
31	EO-12; EVA 4	Installed a Kurs antenna on Kristall's APAS port and retrieved exposure cassettes.			
32	EO-13; EVA 1	Gennadi Manakov; Aleksandr Poleshchuk	19 April 1993; 17:15	19 April 1993; 22:40	5 hours, 25 minutes
32	EO-13; EVA 1	Installed a solar array motor onto one of the mounts on Kvant-1 and discovered that one of the handles of the Strela crane was missing.			
33	EO-13; EVA 2	Gennadi Manakov; Aleksandr Poleshchuk	18 June 1993; 17:25	18 June 1993; 21:58	4 hours, 33 minutes
33	EO-13; EVA 2	Installed a solar array motor onto the other mount fixed to Kvant-1 and replaced the missing handle on the Strela crane.			
34	EO-14; EVA 1	Vasily Tsibliyev; Aleksandr Serebrov	16 September 1993; 05:57	16 September 1993; 10:16	4 hours, 18 minutes
34	EO-14; EVA 1	Affixed a second truss mount on Kvant-1 and attached a box containing the Rapana truss to it.			
35	EO-14; EVA 2	Vasily Tsibliyev; Aleksandr Serebrov	20 September 1993; 03:51	20 September 1993; 07:05	3 hours, 14 minutes
35	EO-14; EVA 2	Assembled the Rapana truss on the mount attached to Kvant-1 on the previous EVA and installed new exposure cassettes.			
36	EO-14; EVA 3	Vasily Tsibliyev; Aleksandr Serebrov	28 September 1993; 00:57	28 September 1993; 02:48	1-hour, 52 minutes
36	EO-14; EVA 3	Installed and retrieved exposure cassettes and began a video recording of the condition of the station's exterior.			
37	EO-14; EVA 4	Vasily Tsibliyev; Aleksandr Serebrov	22 October 1993; 15:47	22 October 1993; 16:25	0 hours, 38 minutes
37	EO-14; EVA 4	Continued the video recording of the condition of the station's exterior and installed a meteoroid monitoring package.			
38	EO-14; EVA 5	Vasily Tsibliyev; Aleksandr Serebrov	29 October 1993; 13:38	29 October 1993; 17:50	4 hours, 12 minutes
38	EO-14; EVA 5	Completed the video recording of the condition of the station's exterior, inspected the base of the Sofora truss and retrieved exposure cassettes.			
39	EO-16; EVA 1	Yuri Malenchenko; Talgat Musabayev	9 September 1994; 07:00	9 September 1994; 12:06	5 hours, 4 minutes
39	EO-16; EVA 1	Inspected the front port of the core module following a collision with Progress M-24 and the exterior of Kristall following a collision with Soyuz TM-17. Affixed a mount to the core module to install a second Strela crane, and installed exposure cassettes.			
40	EO-16; EVA 2	Yuri Malenchenko; Talgat Musabayev	13 September 1994; 06:30	13 September 1994; 12:32	6 hours, 1-minute
40	EO-16; EVA 2	Inspection of Kristall's solar arrays, the array mounts on Kvant-1 and the Sofora truss. Retrieved experiments from the Rapana truss.			
41	EO-18; EVA 1	Vladimir Dezhurov; Gennadi Strekalov	12 May 1995; 04:20	12 May 1995; 10:35	6 hours, 14 minutes
41	EO-18; EVA 1	Retracted the left-side solar array of Kristall.			
42	EO-18; EVA 2	Vladimir Dezhurov; Gennadi Strekalov	17 May 1995; 02:38	17 May 1995; 09:20	6 hours, 52 minutes
42	EO-18; EVA 2	Released the previously retracted solar array on Kristall, transferred it to Kvant-1 and attached it to the previously installed motor and mount on the left side of the module.			
43	EO-18; EVA 3	Vladimir Dezhurov; Gennadi Strekalov	22 May 1995; 00:10	22 May 1995; 05:25	5 hours, 14 minutes
43	EO-18; EVA 3	Completed the installation of the solar array moved on the previous EVA, and partially retracted the remaining array on Kristall (the array could not be fully retracted as it jammed during the procedure).			
44	EO-18; EVA 4 †	Vladimir Dezhurov; Gennadi Strekalov	28 May 1995; 22:22	28 May 1995; 22:43	0 hours, 21 minutes
44	EO-18; EVA 4 †	Reconfigured the core module's docking node for the relocation of Kristall.			
45	EO-18; EVA 5 †	Vladimir Dezhurov; Gennadi Strekalov	1 June 1995; 22:05	1 June 1995; 22:28	0 hours, 23 minutes
45	EO-18; EVA 5 †	Reconfigured the core module's docking node for the arrival of Spektr.			
46	EO-19; EVA 1	Anatoly Solovyev; Nikolai Budarin	14 July 1995; 03:56	14 July 1995; 09:30	5 hours, 34 minutes
46	EO-19; EVA 1	Inspected a faulty solar array on Kvant-2, discovering that it had been fouled by EVA equipment. Released a jammed solar array on Spektr and inspected the right-side docking port on the core module's docking node.			
47	EO-19; EVA 2	Anatoly Solovyev; Nikolai Budarin	19 July 1995, 00:39	19 July 1995, 03:47	3 hours, 8 minutes
47	EO-19; EVA 2	Prepared for the deployment of the Mir Infrared Spectrometer (MIRAS), retrieved exposure cassettes and the TREK cosmic-ray detector and installed new exposure cassettes. The cooling system in Solovyov's spacesuit failed almost immediately, and so he spent most of the EVA reliant on an umbilical from Kvant-2 for life support. Upon their return, difficulties were encountered again with the airlock hatch.			
48	EO-19; EVA 3	Anatoly Solovyev; Nikolai Budarin	21 July 1995; 00:28	21 July 1995; 06:18	5 hours, 35 minutes
48	EO-19; EVA 3	Installed the Belgian-French Mir Infrared Spectrometer (MIRAS) and inspected Kristall's partially retracted solar array.			
49	EO-20; EVA 1	Sergei Avdeyev; Thomas Reiter	20 October 1995; 11:50	20 October 1995; 17:06	5 hours, 16 minutes
49	EO-20; EVA 1	First EVA conducted by an ESA astronaut. Installed the European Space Exposure Facility (ESEF) on Spektr and exchanged the exposure cassette in the Komza experiment.			
50	EO-20; EVA 2 †	Yuri Gidzenko; Sergei Avdeyev	8 December 1995; 19:23	8 December 1995; 19:52	0 hours, 37 minutes
50	EO-20; EVA 2 †	Reconfigured the core module's docking node in preparation for the arrival of Priroda.			
51	EO-20; EVA 3	Yuri Gidzenko; Thomas Reiter	8 February 1996; 14:03	8 February 1996; 17:08	3 hours, 6 minutes
51	EO-20; EVA 3	Remounted the Ikar cosmonaut manoeuvring unit outside the Kvant-2 airlock, exchanged cassettes on the European Space Exposure Facility (ESEF) and attempted to retrieve the redundant Kurs antenna on Kristall.			
52	EO-21; EVA 1	Yury Onufriyenko; Yury Usachov	15 March 1996; 01:04	15 March 1996; 06:55	5 hours, 51 minutes
52	EO-21; EVA 1	Installed a second Strela crane on the right-hand side of the core module, and made preparations for the installation of the Mir Cooperative Solar Array (MCSA).			
53	STS-76; EVA 1 ‡	Michael Clifford; Linda Godwin	27 March 1996; 06:34	27 March 1996; 12:36	6 hours, 2 minutes, 28 seconds
53	STS-76; EVA 1 ‡	Mounted the Mir Environmental Effects Payload (MEEP) to and retrieved a camera from the docking module.			
54	EO-21; EVA 2	Yury Onufriyenko; Yury Usachov	20 May 1996; 22:50	21 May 1996; 04:10	5 hours, 20 minutes
54	EO-21; EVA 2	Transferred the Mir Cooperative Solar Array (MCSA) from the docking module, mounted it to the motor attached to the right-hand side of Kvant-1 and inflated a model Pepsi can for a commercial.			
55	EO-21; EVA 3	Yury Onufriyenko; Yury Usachov	24 May 1996; 20:47	25 May 1996; 02:30	5 hours, 34 minutes
55	EO-21; EVA 3	Extended the Mir Cooperative Solar Array (MCSA) installed onto Kvant-1 on the previous EVA.			
56	EO-21; EVA 4	Yury Onufriyenko; Yury Usachov	30 May 1996; 18:20	30 May 1996; 22:40	4 hours, 20 minutes
56	EO-21; EVA 4	Installed the German Modular Optoelectronic Multispectral/Stereo Scanner (MOMS-2P) on Priroda and handrails on Kvant-2.			
57	EO-21; EVA 5	Yury Onufriyenko; Yury Usachov	6 June 1996; 16:56	6 June 1996; 20:30	3 hours, 34 minutes
57	EO-21; EVA 5	Swapped the exposure cassettes in the Komza experiment and installed new micrometeoroid detectors on the exterior of the station.			
58	EO-21; EVA 6	Yury Onufriyenko; Yury Usachov	13 June 1996; 12:45	13 June 1996; 18:27	5 hours, 42 minutes
58	EO-21; EVA 6	Dismantled the Rapana truss on Kvant-1 and erected the Strombus truss in its place, then completed the deployment of the TRAVERS radar antenna on Priroda following the failure of its automatic deployment mechanism.			
59	EO-22; EVA 1	Valery Korzun; Aleksandr Kaleri	2 December 1996; 15:54	2 December 1996; 21:52	5 hours, 57 minutes
59	EO-22; EVA 1	Began installation of cables to connect the Mir Cooperative Solar Array (MCSA) into the station's electrical system and redeployed the Rapana truss dismantled on the previous EVA on the far end of the Strombus truss.			
60	EO-22; EVA 2	Valery Korzun; Aleksandr Kaleri	9 December 1996; 13:50	9 December 1996; 20:28	6 hours, 36 minutes
60	EO-22; EVA 2	Completed installation of cables to connect the Mir Cooperative Solar Array (MCSA) into the station's electrical system and transferred the Kurs antenna from Kristall to the docking module.			
61	EO-23; EVA 1	Vasily Tsibliyev; Jerry Linenger	29 April 1997; 05:10	29 April 1997; 10:09	4 hours, 59 minutes
61	EO-23; EVA 1	Retrieved the Particle Impact Experiment (PIE) and Mir Sample Return Experiment (MSRE) packages, deployed the Advanced Materials Exposure Experiment (AMEE) and tested the Orlan-M spacesuit.			
62	EO-24; EVA 1 †	Anatoly Solovyev; Pavel Vinogradov	22 August 1997; 11:14	22 August 1997; 14:30	3 hours, 16 minutes
62	EO-24; EVA 1 †	First 'IVA' into Spektr following the module's depressurisation after the Progress M-34 collision. Installed a modified Konus drogue in the core module's docking node and wired it up to connect the module's solar arrays to the station's electrical system. Inspected the interior of Spektr and retrieved equipment from the module.			
63	EO-24; EVA 2	Anatoly Solovyev; Michael Foale	6 September 1997; 01:07	6 September 1997; 07:07	6 hours, 0 minutes
63	EO-24; EVA 2	Inspected the exterior of Spektr for signs of damage and manually reoriented the module's solar arrays.			
64	STS-86; EVA 1 ‡	Scott Parazynski; Vladimir Titov	1 October 1997; 17:29	1 October 1997; 22:30	5 hours, 1-minute
64	STS-86; EVA 1 ‡	Retrieved the Mir Environmental Effects Payload (MEEP) from the docking module and affixed a solar arrays cap to aid Spektr repairs.			
65	EO-24; EVA 3 †	Anatoly Solovyev; Pavel Vinogradov	20 October 1997; 09:40	20 October 1997; 16:18	6 hours, 38 minutes
65	EO-24; EVA 3 †	Second Spektr IVA to reconfigure the module's electrical system.			
66	EO-24; EVA 4	Anatoly Solovyev; Pavel Vinogradov	3 November 1997; 03:32	3 November 1997; 09:36	6 hours, 4 minutes
66	EO-24; EVA 4	Retracted and removed the Kristall solar arrays that had been mounted to the left side of Kvant-1 and deployed the Sputnik 40 subsatellite.			
67	EO-24; EVA 5	Anatoly Solovyev; Pavel Vinogradov	6 November 1997; 00:12	6 November 1997; 06:24	6 hours, 12 minutes
67	EO-24; EVA 5	Installed the MSB solar array launched with the docking module on to the newly vacated mount on the left side of Kvant-1.			
68	EO-24; EVA 6	Anatoly Solovyev; Pavel Vinogradov	8 January 1998; 23:08	9 January 1998; 02:14	3 hours, 6 minutes
68	EO-24; EVA 6	Retrieved the Advanced Materials Exposure Experiment (AMEE) package and conducted repairs to the Kvant-2 airlock hatch.			
69	EO-24; EVA 7	Anatoly Solovyev; David Wolf	14 January 1998; 21:12	14 January 1998; 01:04	3 hours, 52 minutes
69	EO-24; EVA 7	Used a spectroreflectometer to inspect the condition of the radiators on Kvant-2.			
-	EO-25	Talgat Musabayev; Nikolai Budarin	3 March 1998		0 hours, 30 minutes
-	EO-25	Attempted to conduct an EVA to prepare for the repair of the damaged solar array on Spektr, but were unable to open the hatch and were forced to postpone the EVA.			
70	EO-25; EVA 1	Talgat Musabayev; Nikolai Budarin	1 April 1998; 13:35	1 April 1998; 20:15	6 hours, 40 minutes
70	EO-25; EVA 1	Installed EVA anchors to provide access to Spektr's damaged solar array.			
71	EO-25; EVA 2	Talgat Musabayev; Nikolai Budarin	6 April 1998; 13:35	6 April 1998; 17:50	4 hours, 15 minutes
71	EO-25; EVA 2	Installed a brace on Spektr's damaged solar array to reinforce it.			
72	EO-25; EVA 3	Talgat Musabayev; Nikolai Budarin	11 April 1998; 09:55	11 April 1998; 16:20	6 hours, 25 minutes
72	EO-25; EVA 3	Removed the depleted VDU thruster block from the Sofora truss.			
73	EO-25; EVA 4	Talgat Musabayev; Nikolai Budarin	17 April 1998; 07:40	17 April 1998; 14:13	6 hours, 33 minutes
73	EO-25; EVA 4	Prepared for the installation of a new VDU thruster block on the Sofora truss.			
74	EO-25; EVA 5	Talgat Musabayev; Nikolai Budarin	22 April 1998; 05:34	22 April 1998; 11:55	6 hours, 21 minutes
74	EO-25; EVA 5	Installed a new VDU thruster block on the Sofora truss.			
75	EO-26; EVA 1 †	Gennady Padalka; Sergei Avdeyev	15 September 1998; 20:00	15 September 1998; 20:30	0 hours, 30 minutes
75	EO-26; EVA 1 †	Reseated electrical connections inside Spektr controlling the module's solar arrays.			
76	EO-26; EVA 2	Gennady Padalka; Sergei Avdeyev	10 November 1998; 19:23	11 November 1998; 01:18	5 hours, 54 minutes
76	EO-26; EVA 2	Installed the Comets micrometeoroid detector in preparation for the upcoming Leonids meteor shower and deployed the Sputnik 41 subsatellite.			
77	EO-27; EVA 1	Viktor Afanasyev; Jean-Pierre Haigneré	16 April 1999; 04:37	16 April 1999; 10:56	6 hours, 19 minutes
77	EO-27; EVA 1	Retrieved the Comets micrometeoroid detector, installed new experiments and deployed the Sputnik 99 subsatellite.			
78	EO-27; EVA 2	Viktor Afanasyev; Sergei Avdeyev	23 July 1999; 11:06	23 July 1999; 17:13	6 hours, 7 minutes
78	EO-27; EVA 2	Installed and attempted to deploy a prototype communications antenna on the far end of the Sofora truss.			
79	EO-27; EVA 3	Viktor Afanasyev; Sergei Avdeyev	28 July 1999; 09:37	28 July 1999; 14:59	5 hours, 22 minutes
79	EO-27; EVA 3	Completed the deployment of a prototype communications antenna on the far end of the Sofora truss.			
80	EO-28; EVA 1	Sergei Zalyotin; Aleksandr Kaleri	12 May 2000; 10:44	12 May 2000; 15:47	5 hours, 3 minutes
80	EO-28; EVA 1	Final EVA to be conducted at Mir. Tested a sealant dispenser by sealing cracks on the exterior of the station, inspected the Mir Cooperative Solar Array (MCSA), dismantled a solar battery, photographed the station's exterior and retrieved experiments.			

A man dressed in a spacesuit clings to a truss structure, manipulating a second truss with his left hand. Cabling can be seen running along both trusses, and the Earth's horizon can be seen in the background against the blackness of space.	A man dressed in a spacesuit seen crawling along a white, cylindrical space station module. A large solar array can be seen projecting from the top of the module, and various other pieces of apparatus are visible. The Earth's horizon and space are visible behind the solar array.	A man dressed in a white spacesuit with a red stripe seen clinging to the end of a boom-like crane, moving over a white space station module. Various trusses, solar arrays and other structures project from the module, and the Earth is visible in the background.	A man dressed in a white spacesuit with a red stripe manoeuvres along a boom-like crane towards a white cone-shaped space station module. Four arrays, one of which is damaged, project from the module, and the blackness of space forms the background. The rim of the porthole through which the photograph was taken is visible to the right of the image.
Yury Onufriyenko scales the Sofora truss during EO-21.	Yury Usachov seen working on Kvant-1 during EO-21.	Vasily Tsibliyev traverses Mir using a Strela crane during EO-23.	Anatoly Solovyev inspects the exterior of Spektr during the second EVA of EO-24.

== See also ==
- List of spacewalks and moonwalks
- List of cumulative spacewalk records
- List of human spaceflights to Mir
- List of Mir Expeditions
