= Mir EO-12 =

Twelfth expedition to Mir space station

- Mission type: Mir expedition
- Mission duration: 188 days, 21 hours, 39 minutes, 31 seconds
- Orbits completed: 2989

Expedition
- Space station: Mir
- Began: 27 July 1992
- Ended: 1 February 1993
- Arrived aboard: Soyuz TM-15
- Departed aboard: Soyuz TM-15

Crew
- Crew size: Two
- Members: Anatoly Solovyev; Sergei Avdeyev
- Callsign: Spring
- EVAs: 4

Mir EO-12 (Russian: Мир ЭО-12, also known as Principal Expedition 12) was the twelfth crewed expedition to the space station Mir, lasting from July 1992 until February 1993. The crew, consisting of Russian cosmonauts Anatoly Solovyev and Sergei Avdeyev launched aboard Soyuz TM-15 on 27 July 1992 with French Research Cosmonaut Michel Tognini. After remaining on board Mir for just over six months, Solovyev and Avdeyev returned aboard the same spacecraft on 1 February 1993.

Their mission focused on geophysics, materials science, biotechnology, astronomy and medical experiments. Soyuz TM-15 set a Soyuz spacecraft on orbit endurance record.

== Crew ==
Mir EO-12	Name	Spaceflight	Launch	Landing	Duration
Commander	(Russia) Anatoly Solovyev	Third	27 July 1992; Soyuz TM-15	1 February 1993; Soyuz TM-15	188.90 days
Flight engineer	(Russia) Sergei Avdeyev	First	27 July 1992; Soyuz TM-15	1 February 1993; Soyuz TM-15	188.90 days

=== Backup crew ===
Mir EO-12	Name
Commander	(Russia) Gennadi Manakov
Flight engineer	(Russia) Aleksandr Poleshchuk

This crew flew the Soyuz TM-16 spacecraft.

== Mission highlights ==
=== Crew launch and arrival ===
The Mir EO-12 crew were launched aboard Soyuz TM-15 on 27 July 1992 from the Baikonur Cosmodrome together with CNES spationaut Michel Tognini of France. They were inserted into a 190 x 200 km, 51.6° inclination orbit. After rendezvous manoeuvring they docked they with Mir in its 405 x 410 km orbit two days later on 29 July.

For the next two weeks the scientific work of the EO-11 crew (Aleksandr Viktorenko and Aleksandr Kaleri) continued together with the programme of Michel Tognini's Antares mission. They departed Mir aboard Soyuz TM-14 on 9 August, leaving the EO-12 crew to continue operations.

=== Mission operations ===
The EO-12 crew commenced their research programme. On 14 August Progress M-14 arrived and docked at the Kvant-1 port. It carried a 700 kg VDU thruster unit designed to improve Mir's attitude control capability. On 3 September the two cosmonauts performed the first of three EVAs to install the VDU on the end of the 14 m long Sofora girder on Kvant-1. EVAs on 7 and 11 September continued and completed this assignment. On their fourth and final EVA on 15 September the cosmonauts repositioned the Kurs rendezvous and docking system antenna and retrieved experimental samples. Progress M-14 departed on 21 October carrying 150 kg of research material. The Progress M-15 re-supply craft arrived on 29 October and docked at Kvant-1.

The derelict 550 kg Cosmos 1508 satellite passed within 300 m of Mir on 8 November. On 20 November the 16.5 kg MAK-2 satellite, (brought up on Progress M-15) was deployed from the Mir core module experimental airlock. This was produced by the Moscow Aviation Institute to study Earth's ionosphere.

=== End of mission and crew departure ===
Soyuz TM-16 with its two-man crew (who had served as the EO-12 backup crew) arrived and docked with the lateral APAS-89 port (originally intended for Buran) on Kristall on 26 January 1993. The EO-12 crew undocked and returned to Earth on 1 February 1993.
