= Mir EO-19 =

Nineteenth expedition to Mir space station

Coordinates: 50.41°N 68.15°E

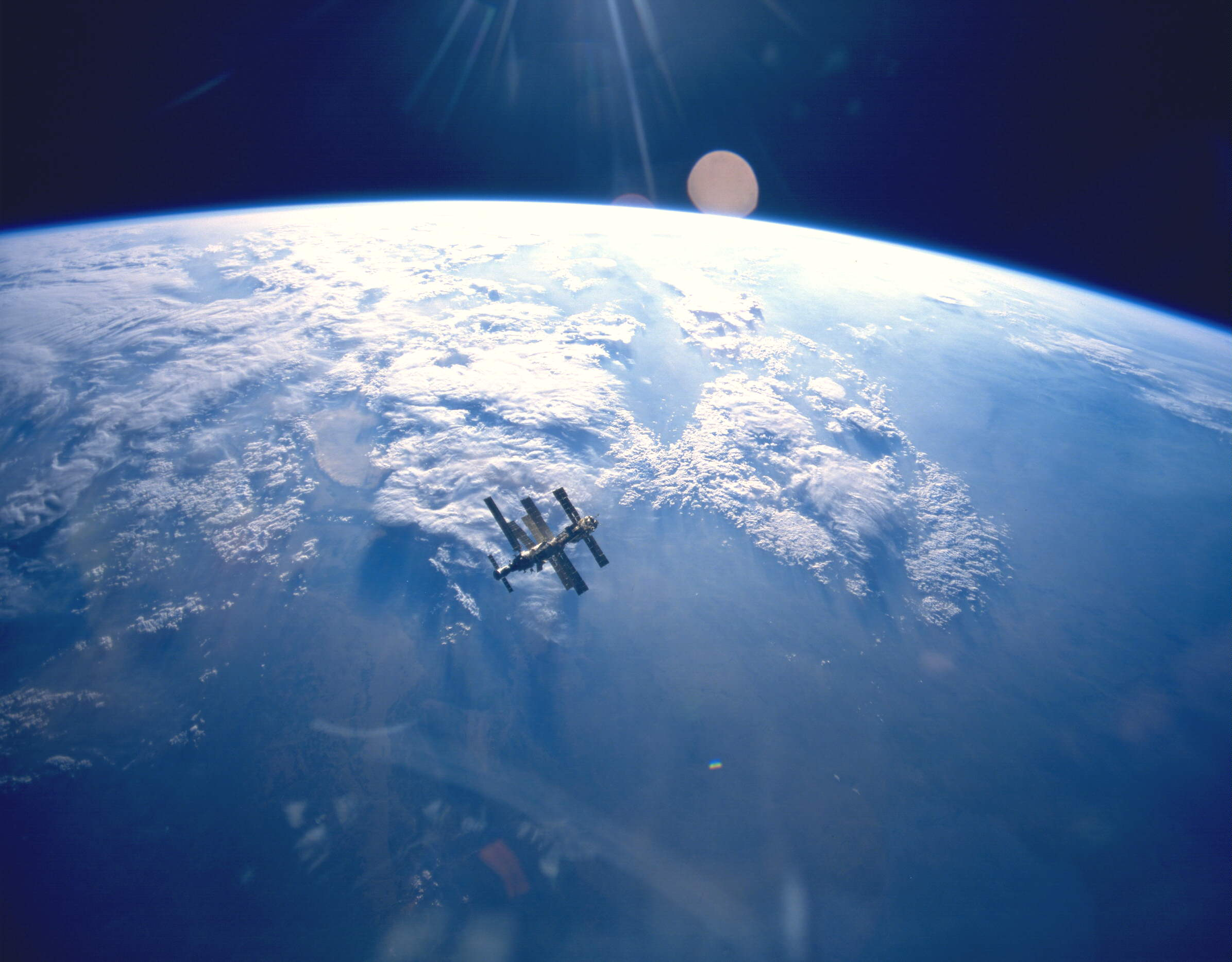
- Mir backdropped by Earth, as seen by the departing STS-71 crew
- Mission type: Mir expedition
- Mission duration: 75.47 days (launch to landing)
- Orbits completed: 1194

Expedition
- Space station: Mir
- Began: 29 June 1995
- Ended: 11 September 1995
- Arrived aboard: STS-71; Space Shuttle Atlantis
- Departed aboard: Soyuz TM-21

Crew
- Crew size: Two
- Members: Anatoly Solovyev; Nikolai Budarin
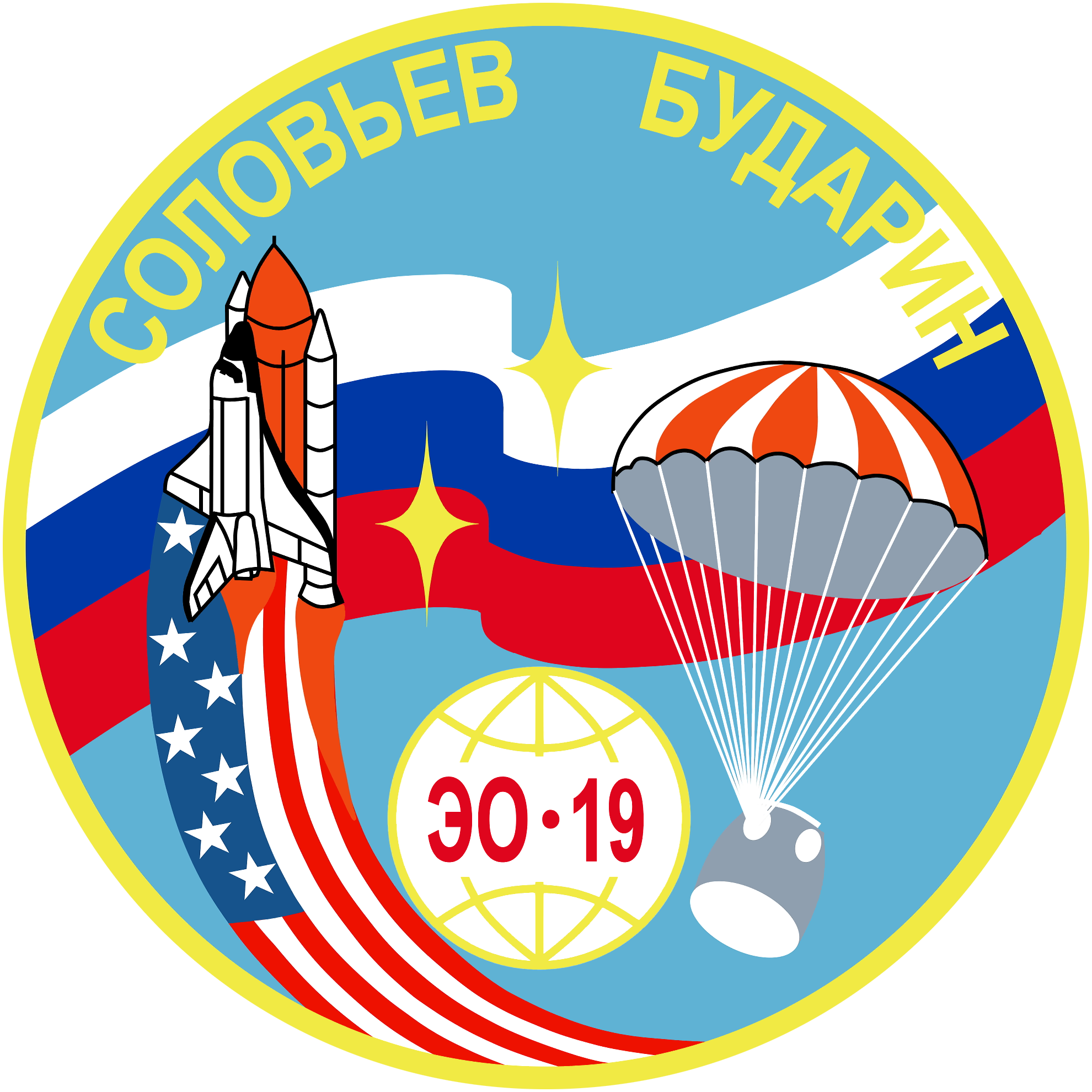
- Long-term Mir expeditions

Mir EO-19 (Russian: Мир ЭО-19, also known as Principal Expedition 19) was the nineteenth crewed expedition to the space station Mir, lasting from June to September 1995. The crew, consisting of Russian cosmonauts Anatoly Solovyev and Nikolai Budarin, launched on June 27, 1995, aboard the Space Shuttle Atlantis on the STS-71 mission. After remaining aboard Mir for approximately 75 days, Solovyev and Budarin returned aboard the Soyuz TM-21 spacecraft on September 11, 1995.

EO-19 lasted just under three months and was the only complete all-Russian crewed expedition to Mir in 1995 and was the first Mir expedition launched on an American Space Shuttle. The mission that launched EO-19, STS-71, was the first Space Shuttle docking to Mir.

== Crew ==
Mir EO-19	Name	Spaceflight	Launch	Landing	Duration
Commander	(Russia) Anatoly Solovyev	Fourth	27 June 1995; STS-71	11 September 1995; Soyuz TM-21	75.47 days
Flight Engineer	(Russia) Nikolai Budarin	First	27 June 1995; STS-71	11 September 1995; Soyuz TM-21	75.47 days

Antatoly Solovyev served as a crew member on three spaceflights prior to EO-19: Mir EP-2, Soyuz TM-9, and Soyuz TM-15. This flight was his first aboard a Space Shuttle, with his three previous flights being on the Soyuz. EO-19 was the first spaceflight for Nikolai Budarin, who completed his cosmonaut training in 1991 and completed specialized training on the systems of Mir and the Soyuz-TM spacecraft in 1993.

Both spent just over 75 days in space during EO-19 and completed 1194 orbits of the Earth.

=== Backup crew ===
Mir EO-19	Name
Commander	(Russia) Yury Onufriyenko
Flight Engineer	(Russia) Aleksandr Poleshchuk

== Mission highlights ==
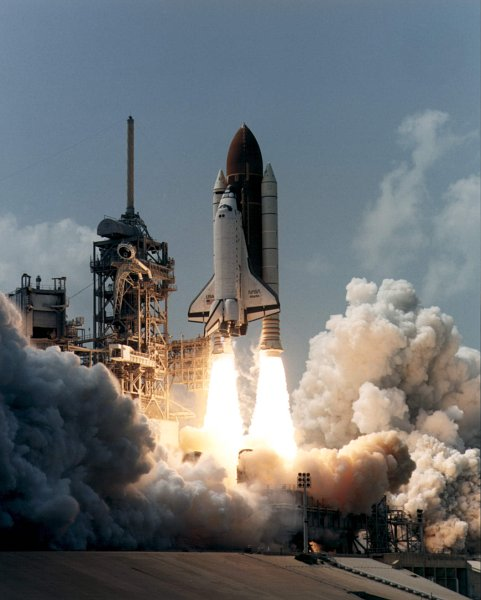
Space Shuttle Atlantis, carrying the crew of EO-19, lifts off on June 27, 1995.

=== Crew launch and arrival ===
The crew of Mir EO-19 launched aboard the Space Shuttle Atlantis on June 27, 1995, as part of the STS-71 mission. STS-71 was the first docking of a Space Shuttle to the Mir space station and the first docking of an American and Russian spacecraft in 20 years.

STS-71 docked with Mir on June 29 and performed a crew exchange between the EO-19 and EO-18 crews aboard the space station. The crews of EO-18, EO-19, and STS-71 performed a ceremony inside Spacelab aboard Atlantis during which the ten crew members assembled a commemorative pewter medallion and exchanged gifts. Shortly thereafter, the crews began transferring supplies and tools to Mir from Atlantis.

On July 4, the newly arrived crew of EO-19 undocked temporarily from the station aboard Soyuz TM-21 to observe and photograph the departure of the STS-71 and EO-18 crews aboard Atlantis. TM-21 undocked at 10:55 GMT, followed by STS-71 at 11:09:45 GMT. The EO-19 crew redocked aboard TM-21 at 11:39 GMT as Atlantis conducted a fly-around of the station. Atlantis, carrying the crews of EO-18 and STS-71, landed on July 7 after several more days in Earth orbit.

=== Mission operations ===
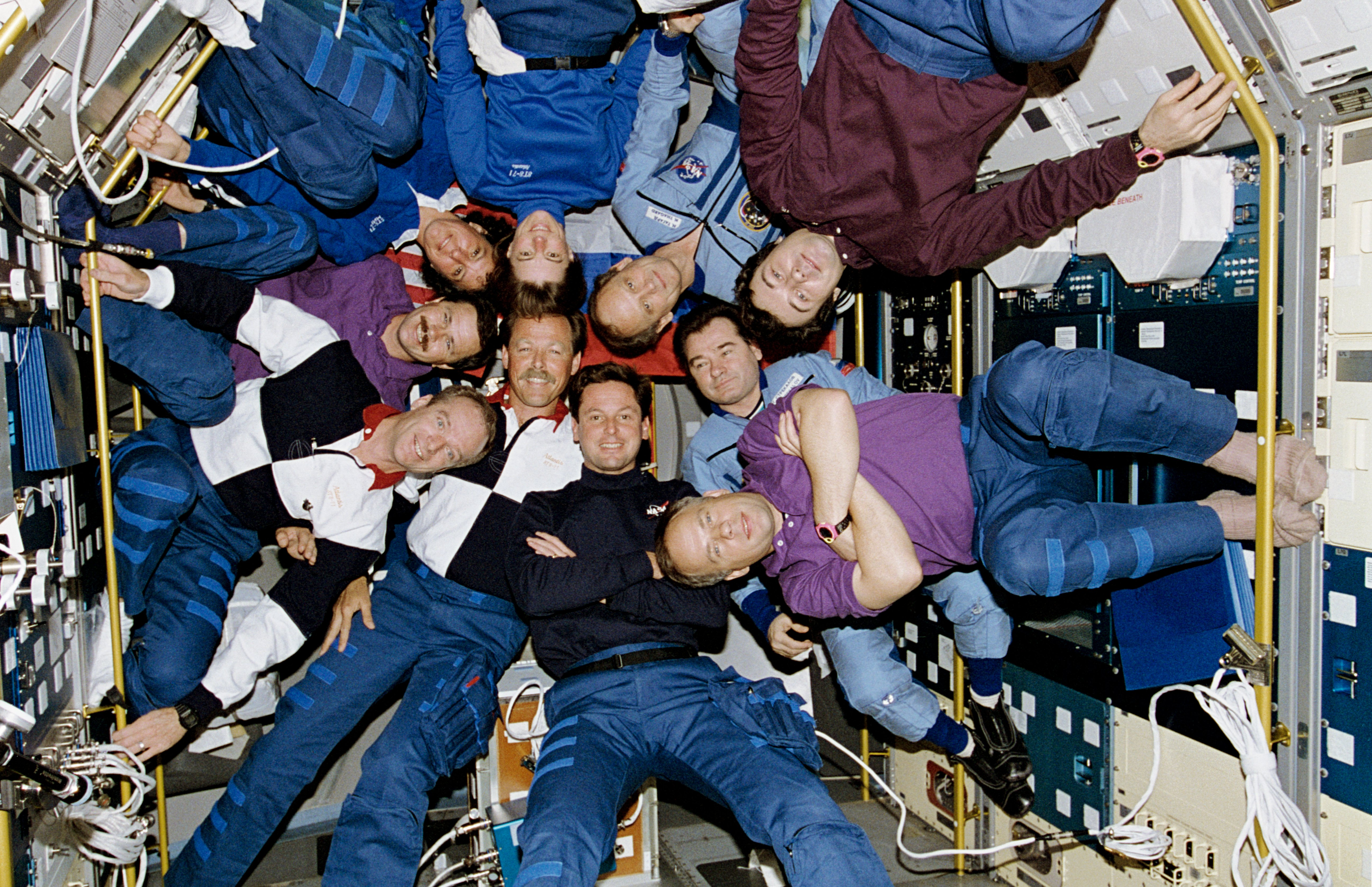
The crews of STS-71, Mir EO-18 and Mir EO-19 pose for a photo inside Spacelab before the Shuttle's departure (Detailed caption).

The crew of EO-19 conducted their first extra-vehicular activity, or spacewalk, on July 14. Before the mission, the crew had trained to use special tools in order to release a stuck solar array on the exterior of the Spektr module. During the spacewalk, the pair cut a problematic restraint from the solar array. All but one section of the array deployed successfully. They then proceeded to inspect a docking mechanism in preparation for the relocation of the Kristall module. The final task of the spacewalk was to inspect a solar array on Kristall that was not tracking the Sun properly. The excursion ended after five hours and thirty-four minutes outside the station.

The crew relocated the Kristall module to another docking port from the port intended for use by Progress M-28 on July 17 using its Lyappa manipulator arm. This operation was performed in preparation for the next docking of Space Shuttle Atlantis to the station on the STS-74 mission later in the year.

During the mission's second spacewalk on July 19, the crew were to deploy a 220 kg (490 lb) Belgian-French spectrometer, named MIRAS (Mir infrared spectrometer) on the Spektr module. Following a malfunction in Anatoly Solovyev's Orlan space suit minutes into the excursion, mission control directed him to remain attached to the Kvant-2 module via umbilical cable. Despite this setback, Nikolai Budarin was able to perform several tasks alone, including preparatory work for the installment of MIRAS and retrieval of an American cosmic ray detector, TREK. The crew returned to the airlock after three hours and eight minutes. Upon returning to the airlock, the crew discovered a 2 mm (0.079 in) gap in the seal, which created difficulty in sealing the hatch.

July 20 saw the launch of the Progress M-28 resupply ship to the station, which docked on July 22. The Progress-M spacecraft remained docked to the station until September 4, when it undocked from Mir filled with waste and excess equipment and intentionally burned up on reentry.

During the mission's third and final spacewalk on July 21, the two cosmonauts made a second attempt at installing the MIRAS spectrometer, which they completed without any major problems. The spacewalk lasted five hours and thirty-five minutes.

During the later part of their mission in August, the crew focused on completing experiments and doing research in the areas of astrophysics, life sciences, and smelting. The remainder of the crew's activities during this time consisted of unloading the newly arrived Progress cargo ship and monitoring its automated refueling of the station's core module.

=== End of mission and crew departure ===
The Mir EO-20 crew consisting of cosmonauts Yuri Gidzenko and Sergei Avdeyev, as well as ESA astronaut Thomas Reiter conducting Euromir '95, launched on September 3 at 9:00 GMT aboard Soyuz TM-22. The crew of EO-20 docked with the station on September 5 at 10:29:54 GMT, with hatch opening occurring at 11:01:23.

After transferring command of Mir to EO-20, the crew of EO-19 boarded the Soyuz TM-21 spacecraft, which arrived with the crew of Mir EO-18 in March 1995, on September 11 and undocked from the Kvant-1 module at 3:30:44 GMT. Soyuz TM-21, along with cosmonauts Solovyev and Budarin, subsequently landed at 6:52:40 GMT about 108 km (67 mi) Northeast of Arkalyk, Kazakhstan.

== See also ==
- List of Mir Expeditions
- STS-71
- Soyuz TM-21
