= List of Mir expeditions =

This is a chronological list of principal expeditions to Mir, the Soviet and later Russian space station that was in low Earth orbit from 1986 to 2001.

All long-duration resident crews were designated Mir EO-n, where EO stands for "Expedition Operations" and n is the sequential expedition number. Short-term visiting crews, designated Mir EP-n, are not included in this list; for those, see List of human spaceflights to Mir.

Mir commanders are listed in italics. "Duration" refers to the length of time the principal crew spent aboard the station and does not always align with their launch ("Flight up") or return ("Flight down") missions.

Expedition	Crew	Launch (UTC)	Flight up	Landing (UTC)	Flight down	Duration (days)
Mir EO-1	(Soviet Union) Leonid Kizim (Soviet Union) Vladimir Solovyov	13 March 1986; 12:33	Soyuz T-15	16 July 1986; 12:34	Soyuz T-15	125.00 (75 on Mir)
station uncrewed (16 July 1986–5 February 1987)
Mir EO-2	(Soviet Union) Aleksandr Laveykin	5 February 1987; 21:38	Soyuz TM-2	30 July 1987; 01:04	Soyuz TM-2	174.14
Mir EO-2	(Soviet Union) Yuri Romanenko	5 February 1987; 21:38	Soyuz TM-2	29 December 1987; 09:16	Soyuz TM-3	326.48
Mir EO-2	(Soviet Union) Aleksandr Aleksandrov	22 July 1987; 01:59	Soyuz TM-3	29 December 1987; 09:16	Soyuz TM-3	160.30
Mir EO-3	(Soviet Union) Vladimir Titov (Soviet Union) Musa Manarov	21 December 1987; 11:18	Soyuz TM-4	21 December 1988; 09:57	Soyuz TM-6	365.94
Mir EO-3	(Soviet Union) Valeri Polyakov	29 August 1988; 04:23	Soyuz TM-6	Transferred to Mir EO-4		
Mir EO-4	(Soviet Union) Aleksandr Volkov (Soviet Union) Sergei Krikalev	26 November 1988; 15:49	Soyuz TM-7	27 April 1989; 02:57	Soyuz TM-7	151.47
Mir EO-4	(Soviet Union) Valeri Polyakov	Transferred from Mir EO-3		27 April 1989; 02:57	Soyuz TM-7	240.94
station uncrewed (27 April–5 September 1989)
Mir EO-5	(Soviet Union) Aleksandr Viktorenko (Soviet Union) Aleksandr Serebrov	5 September 1989; 21:38	Soyuz TM-8	19 February 1990; 04:36	Soyuz TM-8	166.29
Mir EO-6	(Soviet Union) Anatoly Solovyev (Soviet Union) Aleksandr Balandin	11 February 1990; 06:16	Soyuz TM-9	9 August 1990; 07:33	Soyuz TM-9	179.05
Mir EO-7	(Soviet Union) Gennadi Manakov (Soviet Union) Gennady Strekalov	1 August 1990; 09:32	Soyuz TM-10	10 December 1990; 06:08	Soyuz TM-10	130.86
Mir EO-8	(Soviet Union) Viktor Afanasyev (Soviet Union) Musa Manarov	2 December 1990; 08:13	Soyuz TM-11	26 May 1991; 10:04	Soyuz TM-11	175.08
Mir EO-9	(Soviet Union) Anatoly Artsebarsky	18 May 1991; 12:50	Soyuz TM-12	10 October 1991; 04:12	Soyuz TM-12	144.64
Mir EO-9	(Soviet Union) / (Russia) Sergei Krikalev	18 May 1991; 12:50	Soyuz TM-12	Transferred to Mir EO-10		
Mir EO-10	(Soviet Union) / (Russia) Aleksandr Volkov	2 October 1991; 05:59	Soyuz TM-13	25 March 1992; 08:51	Soyuz TM-13	175.12
Mir EO-10	(Soviet Union) / (Russia) Sergei Krikalev	Transferred from Mir EO-9		25 March 1992; 08:51	Soyuz TM-13	311.83
Mir EO-11	(Russia) Aleksandr Viktorenko (Russia) Aleksandr Kaleri	17 March 1992; 10:54	Soyuz TM-14	10 August 1992; 01:05	Soyuz TM-14	145.59
Mir EO-12	(Russia) Anatoly Solovyev (Russia) Sergei Avdeyev	27 July 1992; 06:08	Soyuz TM-15	1 February 1993; 03:49	Soyuz TM-15	188.90
Mir EO-13	(Russia) Gennadi Manakov (Russia) Aleksandr Poleshchuk	24 January 1993; 05:58	Soyuz TM-16	22 July 1993; 06:41	Soyuz TM-16	179.03
Mir EO-14	(Russia) Vasili Tsibliyev (Russia) Aleksandr Serebrov	1 July 1993; 14:32	Soyuz TM-17	14 January 1994; 08:18	Soyuz TM-17	196.74
Mir EO-15	(Russia) Viktor Afanasyev (Russia) Yury Usachev	8 January 1994; 10:05	Soyuz TM-18	9 July 1994; 10:32	Soyuz TM-18	182.02
Mir EO-15	(Russia) Valeri Polyakov	8 January 1994; 10:05	Soyuz TM-18	Transferred to Mir EO-16		
Mir EO-16	(Russia) Yuri Malenchenko (Russia) Talgat Musabayev	1 July 1994; 12:24	Soyuz TM-19	4 November 1994; 11:18	Soyuz TM-19	125.95
Mir EO-16	(Russia) Valeri Polyakov	Transferred from Mir EO-15		Transferred to Mir EO-17		
Mir EO-17	(Russia) Aleksandr Viktorenko (Russia) Yelena Kondakova	3 October 1994; 22:42	Soyuz TM-20	22 March 1995; 04:04	Soyuz TM-20	169.22
Mir EO-17	(Russia) Valeri Polyakov	Transferred from Mir EO-16		22 March 1995; 04:04	Soyuz TM-20	437.75
Mir EO-18	(Russia) Vladimir Dezhurov (Russia) Gennady Strekalov (United States) Norman Thagard	14 March 1995; 06:11	Soyuz TM-21	7 July 1995; 14:55	STS-71	115.36
Mir EO-19	(Russia) Anatoly Solovyev (Russia) Nikolai Budarin	27 June 1995; 19:32	STS-71	11 September 1995; 06:52	Soyuz TM-21	75.47
Mir EO-20	(Russia) Yuri Gidzenko (Russia) Sergei Avdeyev (Germany) Thomas Reiter	3 September 1995; 09:00	Soyuz TM-22	29 February 1996; 10:42	Soyuz TM-22	179.07
Mir EO-21	(Russia) Yuri Onufrienko (Russia) Yury Usachev	21 February 1996; 12:34	Soyuz TM-23	2 September 1996; 07:41	Soyuz TM-23	193.80
Mir EO-21	(United States) Shannon Lucid	22 March 1996; 08:13	STS-76	Transferred to Mir EO-22		
Mir EO-22	(Russia) Valery Korzun (Russia) Aleksandr Kaleri	17 August 1996; 13:18	Soyuz TM-24	2 March 1997; 06:44	Soyuz TM-24	196.73
Mir EO-22	(United States) Shannon Lucid	Transferred from Mir EO-21		26 September 1996; 12:13	STS-79	188.17
Mir EO-22	(United States) John Blaha	16 September 1996; 08:54	STS-79	January 22, 1997; 14:23	STS-81	128.23
Mir EO-22	(United States) Jerry Linenger	12 January 1997; 09:27	STS-81	Transferred to Mir EO-23		
Mir EO-23	(Russia) Vasili Tsibliyev (Russia) Aleksandr Lazutkin	10 February 1997; 14:09	Soyuz TM-25	14 August 1997; 12:17	Soyuz TM-25	184.92
Mir EO-23	(United States) Jerry Linenger	Transferred from Mir EO-22		24 May 1997; 13:27	STS-84	132.17
Mir EO-23	(United Kingdom) (United States) Michael Foale	15 May 1997; 09:07	STS-84	Transferred to Mir EO-24		
Mir EO-24	(Russia) Anatoly Solovyev (Russia) Pavel Vinogradov	5 August 1997; 15:35	Soyuz TM-26	19 February 1998; 09:10	Soyuz TM-26	197.73
Mir EO-24	(United Kingdom) (United States) Michael Foale	Transferred from Mir EO-23		6 October 1997; 21:55	STS-86	144.57
Mir EO-24	(United States) David Wolf	26 September 1997; 02:34	STS-86	31 January 1998; 22:36	STS-89	127.83
Mir EO-24	(United States) Andrew Thomas	23 January 1998; 01:48	STS-89	Transferred to Mir EO-25		
Mir EO-25	(Russia) Talgat Musabayev (Russia) Nikolai Budarin	29 January 1998; 16:33:42	Soyuz TM-27	25 August 1998; 05:24:44	Soyuz TM-27	207.53
Mir EO-25	(United States) Andrew Thomas	Transferred from Mir EO-24		12 June 1998; 18:00	STS-91	140.63
Mir EO-26	(Russia) Gennady Padalka	13 August 1998; 09:43	Soyuz TM-28	28 February 1999; 02:14	Soyuz TM-28	198.69
Mir EO-26	(Russia) Sergei Avdeyev	13 August 1998; 09:43	Soyuz TM-28	Transferred to Mir EO-27		
Mir EO-27	(Russia) Viktor Afanasyev (France) Jean-Pierre Haigneré	20 February 1999; 04:18	Soyuz TM-29	28 August 1999; 00:34	Soyuz TM-29	188.85
Mir EO-27	(Russia) Sergei Avdeyev	Transferred from Mir EO-26		28 August 1999; 00:34	Soyuz TM-29	379.62
station uncrewed (28 August 1999–4 April 2000)
Mir EO-28	(Russia) Sergei Zalyotin (Russia) Aleksandr Kaleri	4 April 2000; 05:01	Soyuz TM-30	16 June 2000; 00:43	Soyuz TM-30	72.82

== See also ==
- Mir
- List of Mir visitors
- List of human spaceflights to Mir
- List of ESA space expeditions
- List of International Space Station Expeditions
- List of Tiangong Space Station expeditions
