= Deorbit of Mir =

Controlled atmospheric entry of Mir over the Pacific

- Mir reentry track
- Date: 23 March 2001
- Time: 00:32–05:59 (UTC)
- Duration: 5 hours and 27 minutes
- Location: 40°S 160°W
- Type: Controlled atmospheric entry
- Target: Mir
- Organised by: Roscosmos
- Outcome: Mir burned up in the atmosphere
- Footage: Atmospheric entry

The Russian space station Mir ended its mission on 23 March 2001, when it was brought out of its orbit, entered the atmosphere and was destroyed. Major components ranged from about 5 to 15 years in age, and included the Mir Core Module, Kvant-1, Kvant-2, Kristall, Spektr, Priroda, and Docking Module. Although Russia was optimistic about Mir's future, the country's commitments to the International Space Station programme left no funding to support Mir.

The deorbit was carried out in three stages. The first stage was waiting for atmospheric drag to decay the orbit to an average of 220 kilometres (140 mi). This began with the docking of Progress M1-5. The second stage was the transfer of the station into a 165-by-220-kilometre (103 mi × 137 mi) orbit. This was achieved with two burns of the Progress M1-5's control engines at 00:32 UTC and 02:01 UTC on 23 March 2001. After a two-orbit pause, the third and final stage of Mir's deorbit began with the firing of Progress M1-5's control engines and main engine at 05:08 UTC, lasting a little over 22 minutes. The atmospheric entry at the altitude of 100 kilometres (62 mi) occurred at 05:44 UTC near Nadi, Fiji.

== Background ==
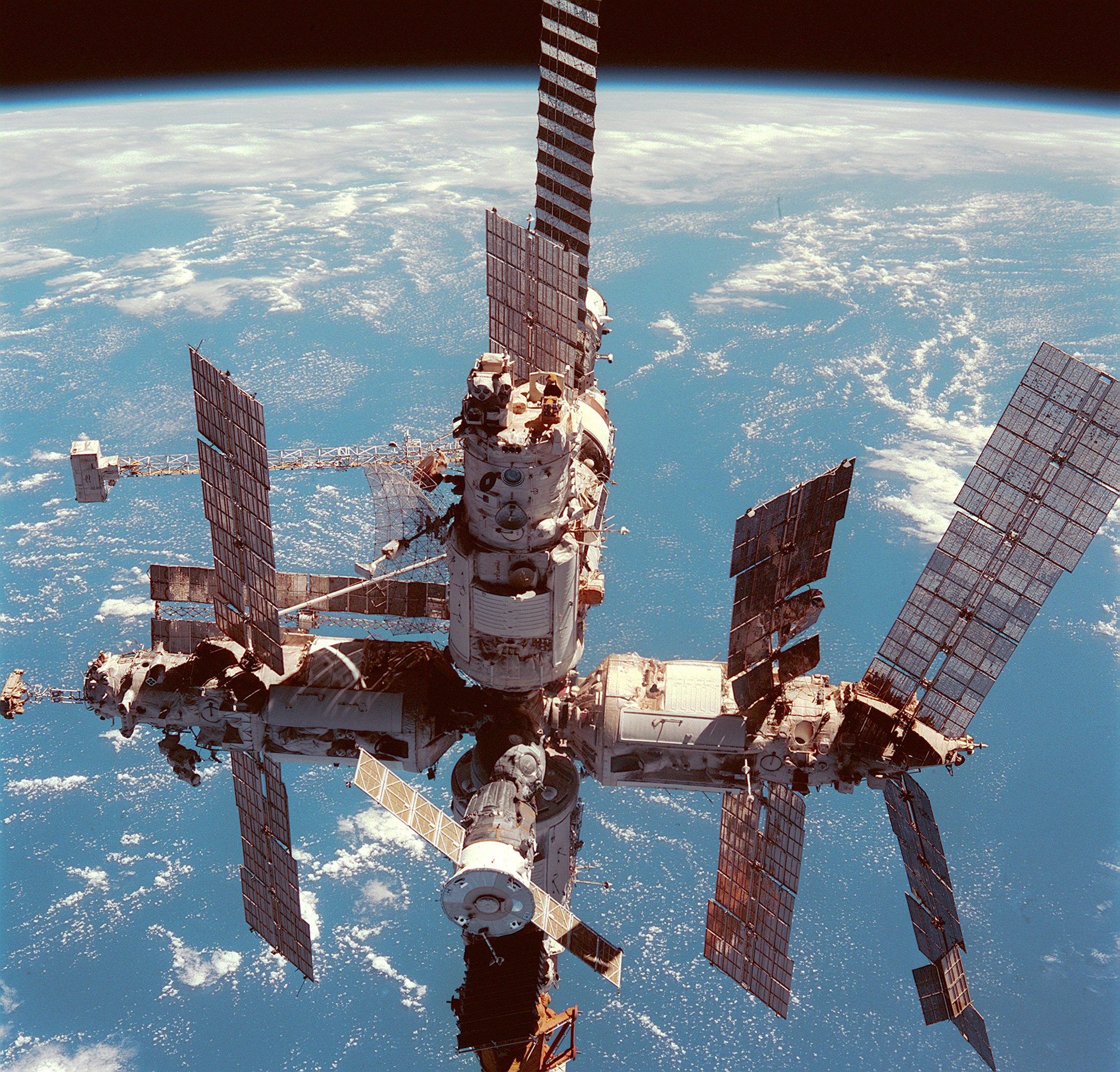
Mir three years before deorbit

After the construction of the International Space Station began in 1998, Russian resources were split between the two stations. In 2000, Roscosmos signed an agreement with MirCorp to lease the station for commercial use, with the Soyuz TM-30 mission, intended to prepare the station for future use and conduct some commercial research, being flown later that year. This was to have been followed by more missions, including flights with space tourists. Due to the Russian government being concerned about MirCorp's ability to fund these missions, Roscosmos decided against funding the continued operation of Mir.

In November 2000, Roscosmos decided to deorbit Mir, and the next month Russian Prime Minister Mikhail Kasyanov signed an order to do so. By this stage Mir was well past the end of its design life, and Roscosmos General Director Yuri Koptev believed that "any of its systems could well fail at any time". Therefore, it was decided to deorbit it while it was still functioning rather than risk it falling back to Earth out of control, like Skylab in 1979 and Salyut 7 in 1991, potentially dropping debris over a populated area.

== Process ==
External videos
- An animation showing the deorbiting process.

The Mir Deorbit Monitoring Group, whose members were located in the Russian Mission Control Center (RMCC) and ESOC, was monitoring the whole dynamic phase of operation. Both RMCC control rooms in Moscow were used for the massive media presence during the final stages of operation. Real-time reports from RMCC were provided via teleconference during each deorbit burn to ESA spokespersons and representatives from national agencies. Video transmissions from RMCC were also made available to ESOC.

Two out of three Progress M1-5 propulsion firings, at approximately 90 minute intervals, were used to bring the perigee of Mir down to an altitude of 188 kilometers (117 miles, 102 nautical miles) and 158 kilometers (98 miles, 85 nautical miles) respectively. A tough contact with the atmosphere occurred at 100 kilometres (62 mi) altitude, when some of the external light elements of Mir were torn off due to the rush through the rarefied air. At an altitude of 90 kilometres (56 mi) sufficient heating from Mir's hull created a glowing halo of hot plasma. At about that time, the orbital complex broke apart and several of Mir's elements, surrounded by the plasma, were visible from Fiji against the evening sky. Television pictures were transmitted around the world within a few minutes of the event. The entire process lasted from about 16:20 to 20:29 local solar time. A short press conference was held in RMCC to cover the final stage of deorbit.

An official statement announced that Mir "ceased to exist" at 05:59:24 GMT. The final tracking of Mir was conducted by a United States Army site on Kwajalein Atoll. The European Space Agency, German Federal Ministry of Defence and NASA also assisted with tracking Mir during its final orbit and reentry.

== Debris ==
At the time, Mir was the largest spacecraft ever to reenter the Earth's atmosphere, and there were concerns that sizeable pieces of debris, particularly from the docking assemblies, gyrodynes and external structure, could survive reentry. Amid debris fall, New Zealand issued international warnings to ships and aircraft traveling in the South Pacific area. Deputy director of New Zealand's Maritime Safety Authority, Tony Martin, said that the chances of debris hitting ships would be very small. A similar situation occurred in Japan, whose residents were warned to stay indoors during the forty-minute period when debris were most likely to fall. The local officials admitted that the chances of an accident were very low. The location of Mir announced after re-entry was 40°S 160°W in the South Pacific Ocean. The debris were spread out along a ±1,500 kilometres (930 mi) long and ±100 kilometres (62 mi) wide track, well within the estimated ±3,000 kilometres (1,900 mi) to 4,000 kilometres (2,500 mi) long and 200 kilometres (120 mi) wide target area, due to the steeper re-entry angle.
