= Priroda =

Module of the Mir space station

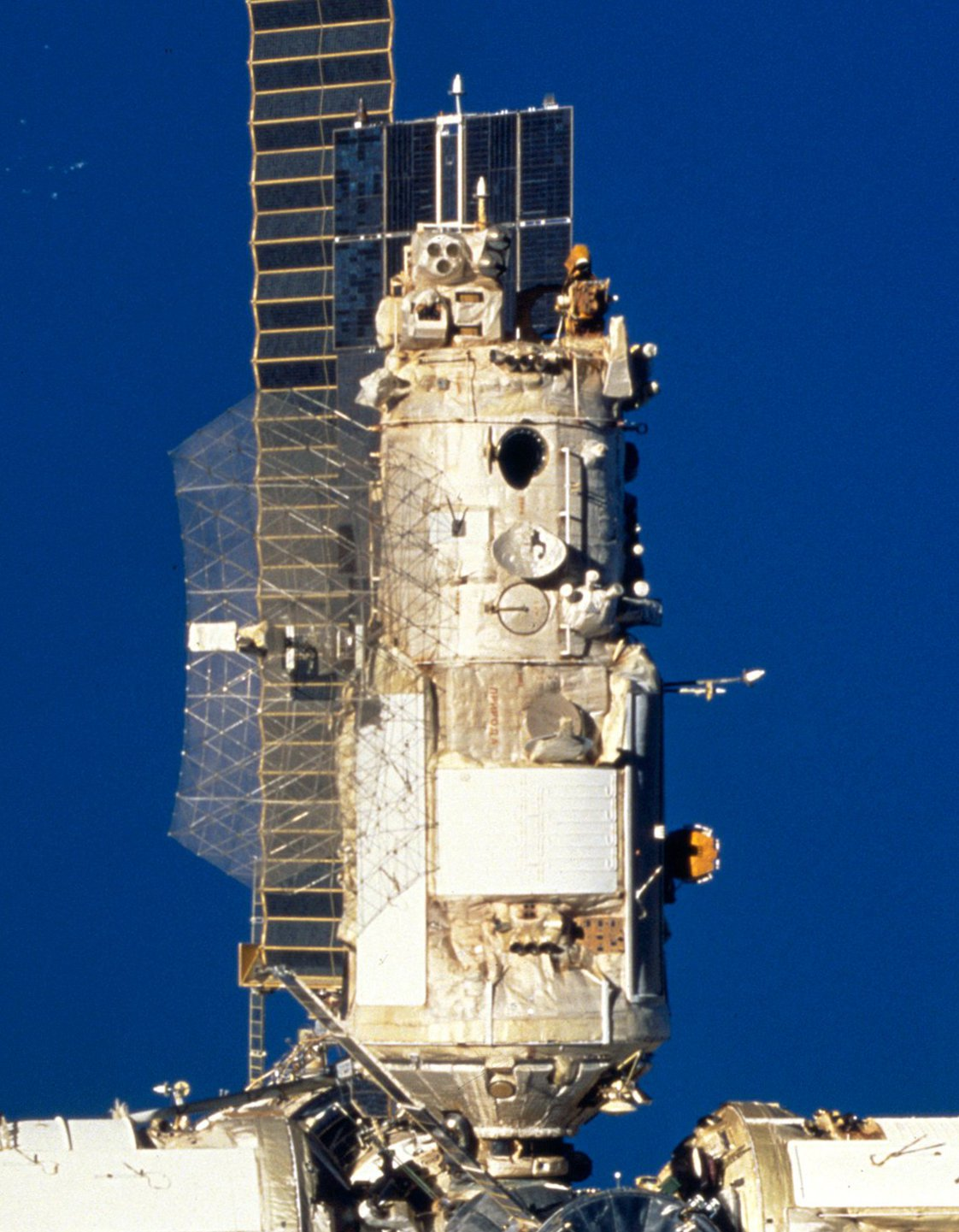
- A view of Priroda from the departing Space Shuttle Endeavour during STS-89

Module statistics
- COSPAR ID: 1996-023A
- Part of: Mir
- Launch date: April 23, 1996 (UTC)
- Docked: April 26, 1996 (UTC)
- Reentry: March 23, 2001 (UTC)
- Mass: 19,700 kg (43,400 lb)
- Length: 9.7 m (32 ft)
- Diameter: 4.35 m (14.3 ft)
- Pressurised volume: 66 m^{3} (2,300 cu ft)

Configuration
- Diagram of Priroda

Priroda (Russian: Природа, lit. 'Nature') was the seventh and final module of the Mir space station. Its primary purpose was to conduct Earth resource experiments through remote sensing, to develop and verify remote sensing methods. The control system of Priroda was developed by Khartron.

== Description ==
Priroda, like previous modules on Mir, was based on the 77K (TKS) design. It was originally designed to carry a deployable solar array. However due to delays, and Mir having solar arrays already planned, Priroda did not launch with an array, and instead was powered by batteries.

The module included both a pressurised crewed compartment and an unpressurised instrument compartment, which had scientific equipment mounted externally; which were provided by twelve different nations. These experiments covered microwave, visible, near infrared, and infrared spectral regions using both passive and active sounding methods.

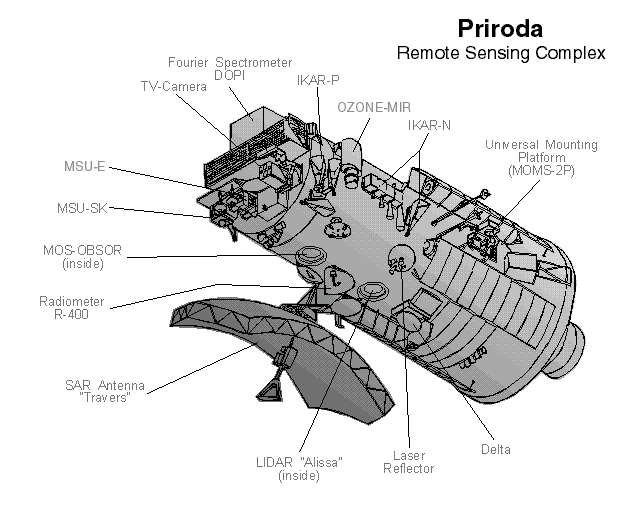
Diagram of Priroda pointing out external features

Remote sensing instruments:

- Alissa lidar - measured cloud height, structure, optical properties. 150 m vertical resolution, 1 km horizontal resolution
- Centaur 400 MHz receiver - used to gather ocean buoy data
- DOPI interferometer - studies gases and aerosols. 2.4-20 micrometer
- Greben ocean altimeter - 10 cm resolution, 13.76 GHz, 2.5 km swath, nadir viewing
- Ikar N nadir microwave radiometers - 0.3, 0.8, 1.35, 2.25, 6.0 cm wavelengths, 60 km swath, resolution 60 km and 0.15 K
- Ikar Delta scanning microwave radiometer system - scanned 40° off track with a 400 km swath. 4.0, 0.3, 0.8, 1.35 cm wavelengths, resolution 8 – 50 km and 0.15 - 0.5 K
- Ikar P panoramic microwave radiometers - 2.25, 6.0 cm wavelengths, 750 km swath, resolution 75 km and 0.15 K
- Istok 1 IR spectroradiometer - wavelengths between 4.0-16.0 micrometer, 7 km swath, 0.7 x 2.8 km resolution
- MOS-Obzor spectrometer - measured aerosol profile and ocean reflectance. 17 channels between 0.750-1.01 micrometer, 80 km swath, 700 m resolution
- MOMS 02P Earth imager - 4 channels between 0.440-0.810 micrometer. Multi spectral, stereo or high resolution data, 6 km resolution. German instrument, initially flown aboard Spacelab D2 on Shuttle.
- MSU-E2 high resolution optical scanner - 10 m resolution, 3 channels between 0.5 and 0.9 micrometer, nadir viewing, 2 x 24.5 km swaths
- Ozon M spectrometer - used for ozone/aerosol profiles. 160 channels between 0.257-1.155 micrometer, 1 km altitude resolution

- Travers Synthetic Aperture Radar - 1.28/3.28 GHz, 50 km swath, 38° look angle, 50 m resolution.

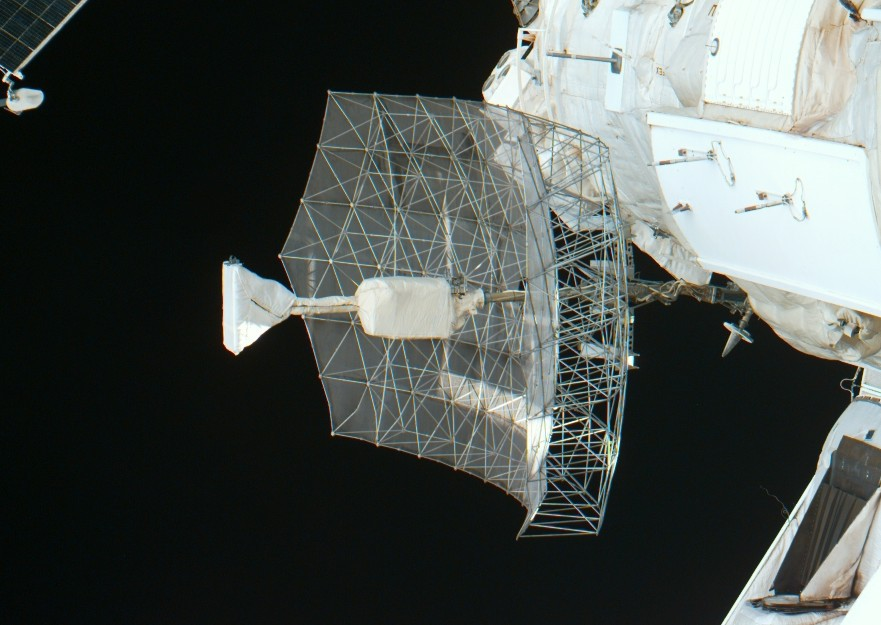
Closeup of the Travers antenna taken by the crew of STS-79

== Launch and docking ==
Priroda was launched on April 23, 1996, on a Proton rocket. After reaching orbit, an electrical connector failure caused the amount of power available on Priroda to be cut in half. Due to the electrical problem, Priroda would only have one attempt at docking before power would be lost. This caused some concern for ground controllers because most other modules failed to dock on their first attempt. However, Priroda docked with no problems on April 26. After being moved to its permanent location at the +Z docking port on the base block, Priroda was connected to the rest of the station's electrical system, which allowed it to run off power from solar arrays on other modules. The crew on board then removed the batteries from Priroda and stored them in Progress M-31 for a destructive re-entry.

During the last expedition to Mir in 2000, power loads were reportedly so high that the crew was not able to activate any of Priroda's payloads.

Priroda, along with the other Mir components, were destroyed when the Mir station was de-orbited in March 2001, entering the Earth's atmosphere.

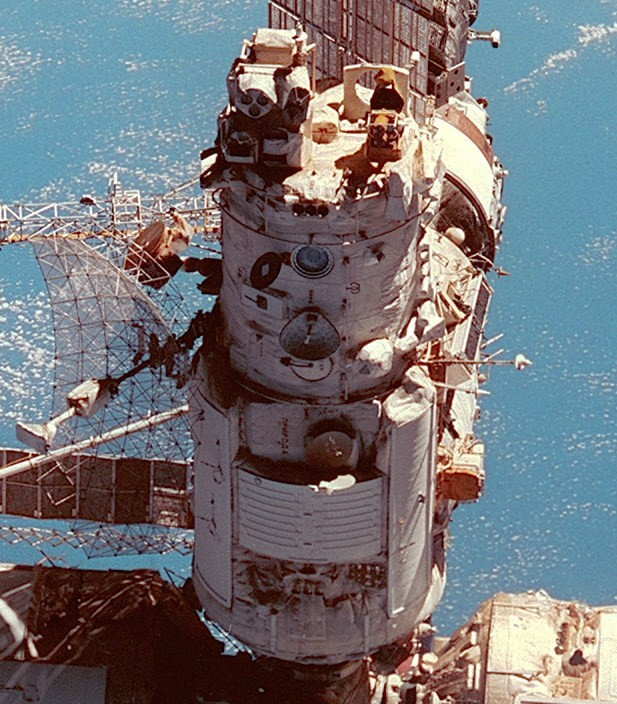
Priroda taken by STS-91
