= Mir EO-21 =

Twenty-first expedition to Mir space station

- Mission type: Mir expedition
- Mission duration: 193.8 days (Onufrienko, Usachyov) (launch to landing)

Expedition
- Space station: Mir
- Began: 21 February 1996
- Ended: 2 September 1996
- Arrived aboard: Soyuz TM-23; STS-76 (Lucid); Space Shuttle Atlantis
- Departed aboard: Soyuz TM-23; STS-79; Space Shuttle Atlantis

Crew
- Crew size: 2 (February-March); 3 (March-September)
- Members: Yuri Onufrienko; Yury Usachov; Shannon Lucid* (from March) * - Transferred to EO-22
- Callsign: Skif
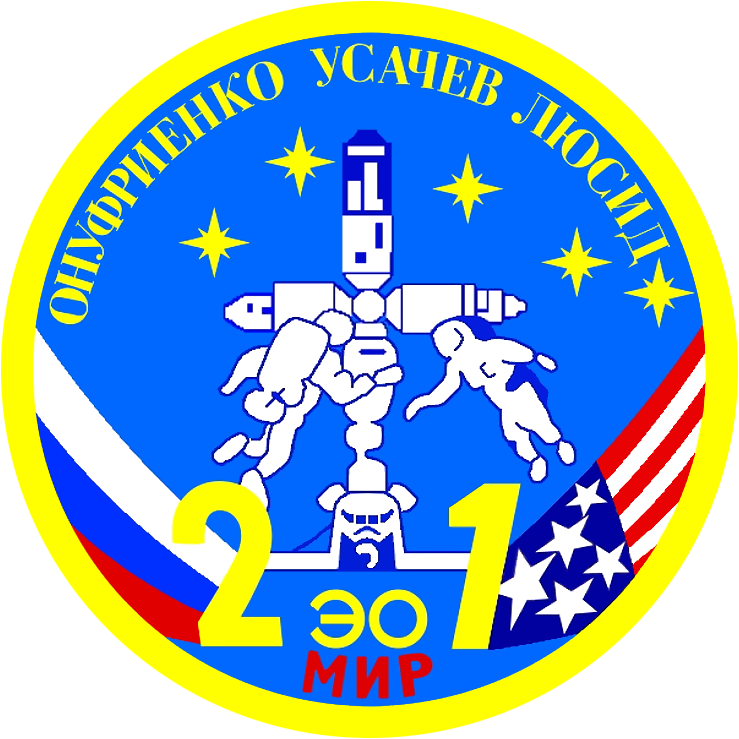
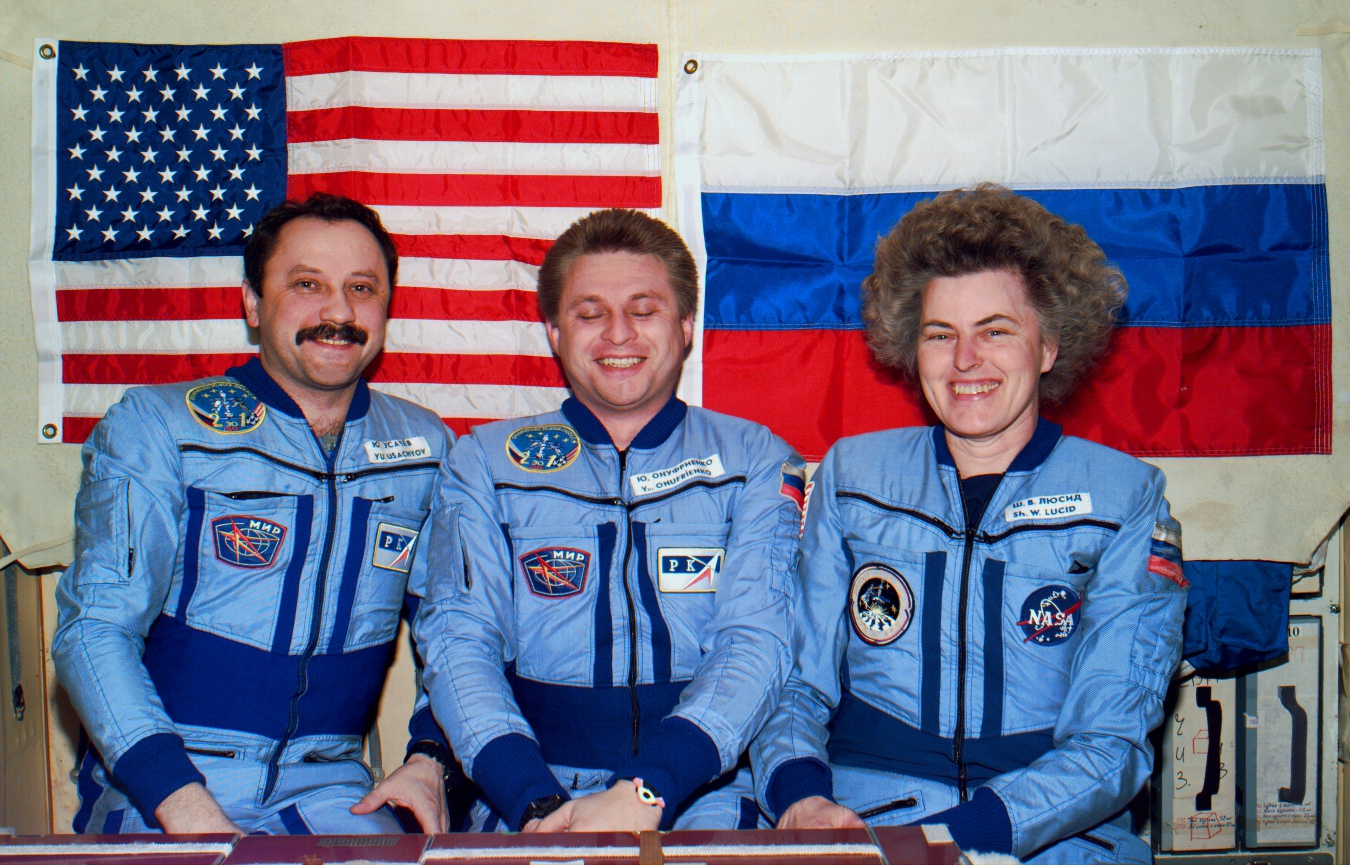
- Yury Usachov, Yuri Onufrienko, Shannon Lucid Long-term Mir expeditions

Mir EO-21 was a long-duration mission aboard the Russian Space station Mir, which occurred between February and September 1996. The crew consisted of two Russian cosmonauts, Commander Yuri Onufrienko and Yury Usachov, as well as American astronaut Shannon Lucid. Lucid arrived at the station about a month into the expedition, and left about a week following its conclusion; NASA refers to her mission as NASA-2. She was the second American to have a long-duration stay aboard Mir, the first being Norman Thagard, as a crew member of Mir EO-18; he stayed on the station for 111 days. Some sources refer to her mission as Mir NASA-1, claiming that she was the first American to have a long-duration stay aboard Mir.

== Crew ==
Mir EO-21	Name	Spaceflight	Launch	Landing	Duration	Notes
Commander	(Russia) Yuri Onufrienko	First	21 February 1996; Soyuz TM-23	2 September 1996; Soyuz TM-23	193 days	
Flight Engineer	(Russia) Yury Usachov	Second	21 February 1996; Soyuz TM-23	2 September 1996; Soyuz TM-23	193 days	
Flight Engineer	(United States) Shannon Lucid	Fifth and last	22 March 1996; STS-76	26 September 1996; STS-79	188 days	Aboard the station for some of Mir EO-22

== Mission highlights ==
=== Crew handover and Mir Cassiopee ===
On 19 August 1996, the Soyuz TM-24 spacecraft docked with Mir's front port. It brought to the station two of the next long-duration crew, Valery Korzun and Aleksandr Kaleri. The following expedition, Mir EO-22, would be commanded by Korzun. Also aboard Soyuz TM-24 was French astronaut Claudie Haigneré (then called Claudie Andre-Deshays), whose mission is known as Mir Cassiopee.
