= Mir Core Module =

First module of the Soviet/Russian Mir space station

DOS-7
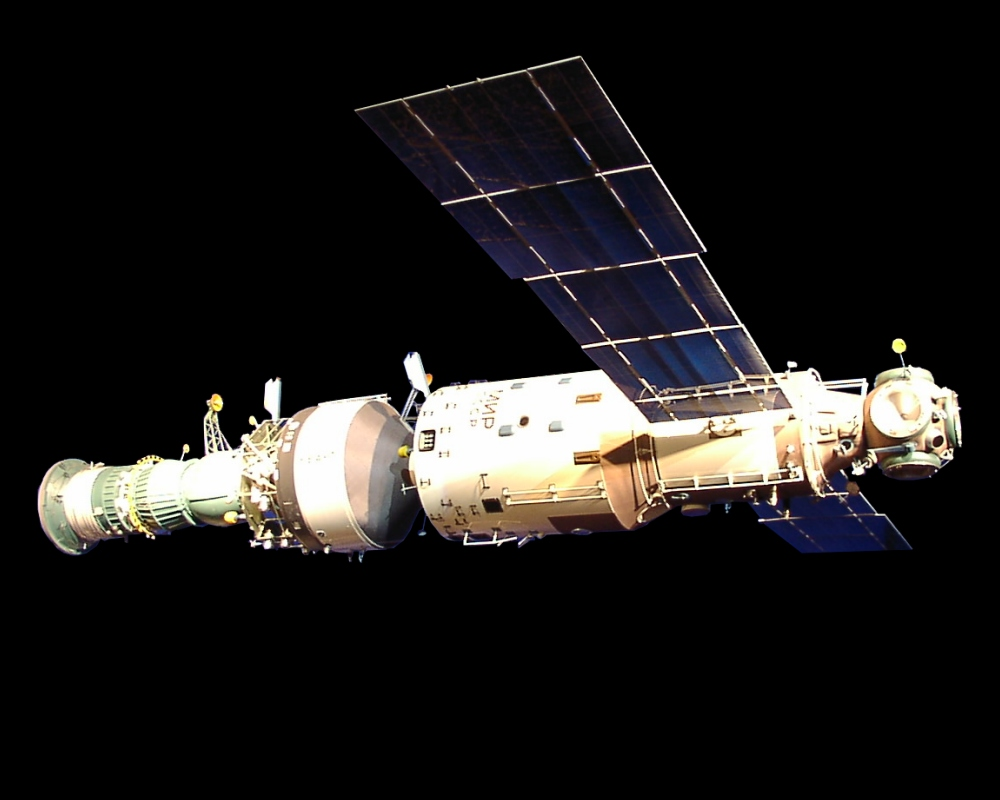
- Model of DOS-7 in an early configuration, docked with Kvant-1.

Module statistics
- Part of: Mir
- Launch date: February 20, 1986 (UTC)
- Reentry: March 23, 2001 (UTC)
- Mass: 20,400 kg (45,000 lb)
- Length: 13.13 m (43.1 ft)
- Diameter: 4.5 m (15 ft)
- Pressurised volume: 90 m^{3} (3,200 cu ft)

Configuration
- Diagram of DOS-7 in its original configuration.

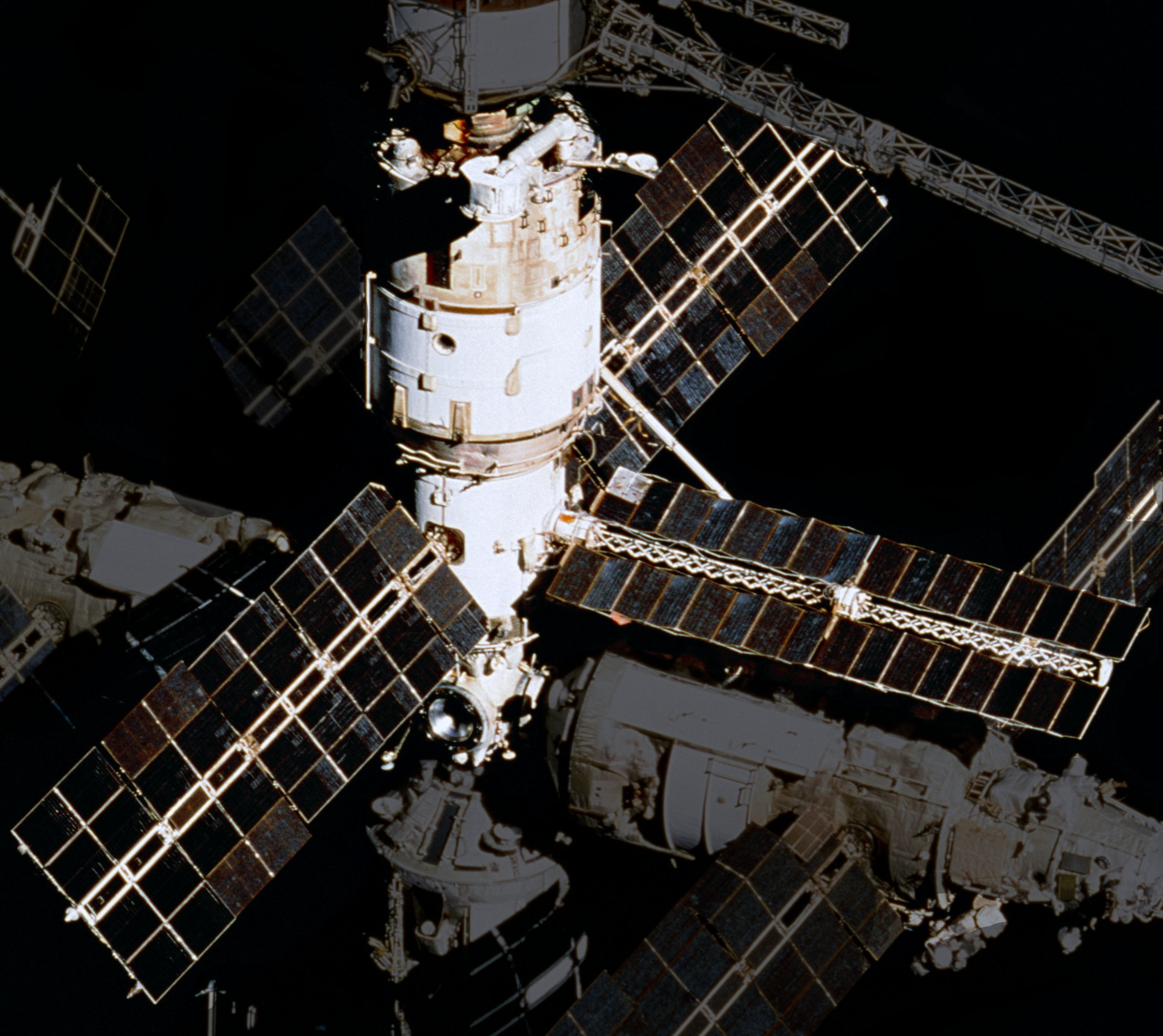
DOS-7 seen from Space Shuttle Atlantis during STS-71 in 1995.

The Mir Core Module, also known as the Base Block or DOS-7, was a module of the Mir space station. It was the first module to be launched and operated in low Earth orbit from 1986 until its de-orbiting in 2001. The module was launched on a Proton-K rocket on February 20th, 1986.

A spare of this module, originally designed for Mir-2, later became the Zvezda module used on the International Space Station.

== Design ==
The Mir Core Module was based on the design of its predecessors from the Salyut programme, however, unlike the others it was designed as a habitation module, and thus housed less scientific equipment. Most importantly, it possessed a multi-port docking node on the forward end of the module. This experimental and revolutionary upgrade allowed the station to house an additional five modules, allowing for greater expansion of the station capabilities. The multi-port docking node also had fixtures for the Lyappa arm, which allowed for modules to move themselves around the station. Other changes included larger solar arrays twice the size of Salyut 7's, made out of gallium arsenide (rather than silicon, as was used on Salyut 7's arrays) which saw a 30% improvement in power generation, greater automation and a new docking system, Kurs, in addition to the older Igla system. The station, like its predecessors, had an aft docking node intended for Progress and Soyuz dockings. It also retained its small airlock for science or rubbish disposal.

Additionally, certain features, such as the large imaging camera which had partially obstructed the living area on the prior Salyut stations, were removed, allowing for a more comfortable living area.

The interior of the module featured a two-toned appearance (designed by Galina Balashova, who had previously designed interior décor for the Soyuz spacecraft and Salyut stations) as well as fluorescent lighting, one lavatory, two sleeping cabins, exercise equipment, medical equipment and a command centre with television screens for communicating with the RKA Mission Control Center, as well as the new Argon 16B main on-board computer.

The station also had two liquid fuel orbital-manoeuvring engines located aft, capable of 300 kg thrust. These became inoperable when Kvant-1 was docked.

== History ==
The Mir Core Module was launched uncrewed on February 20th, 1986 and was first docked to and crewed by Soyuz T-15 which later visited Salyut 7 after their stay on Mir, then later returned back to Mir.

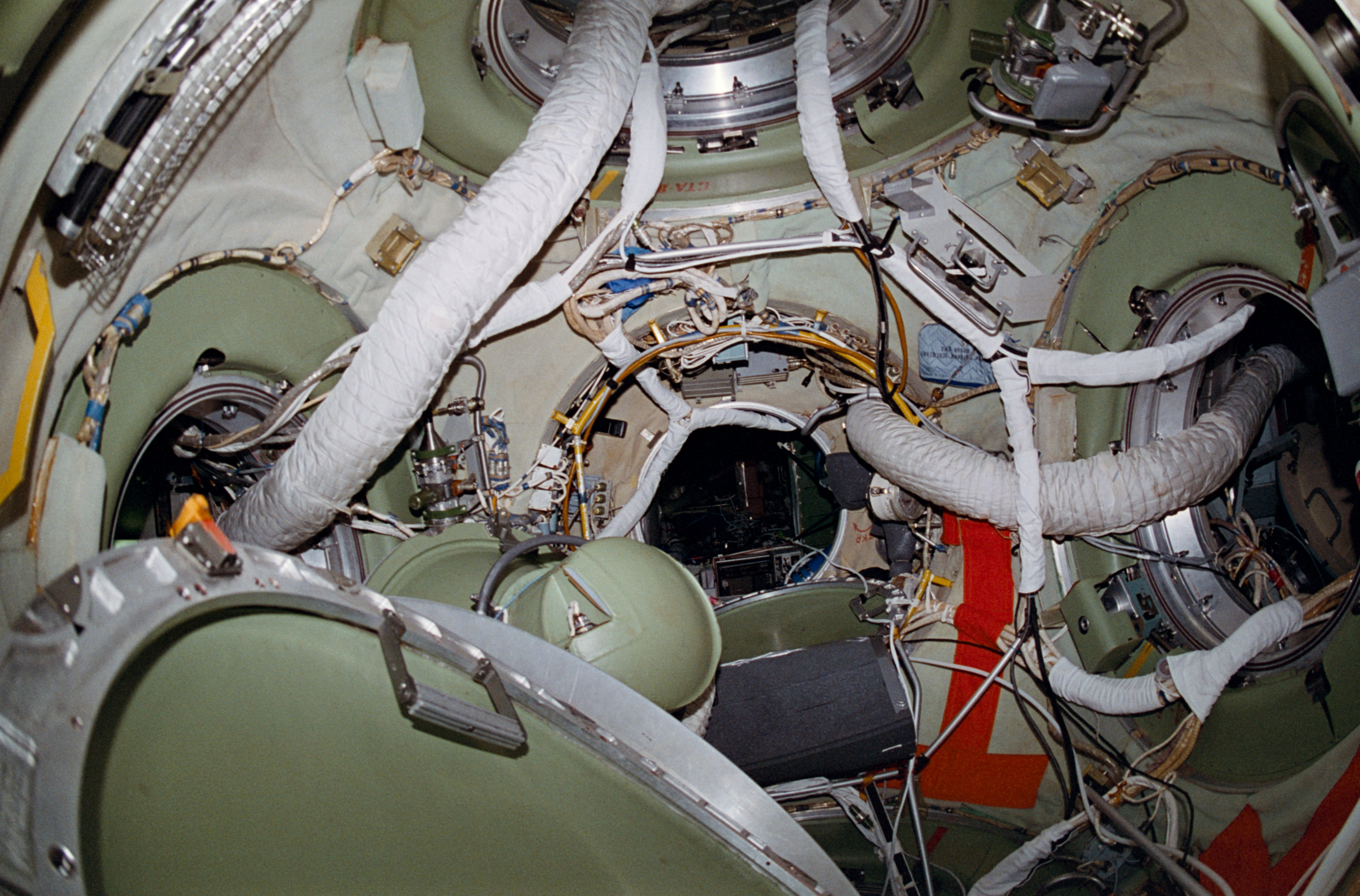
Inside the multiple docking node

On April 9th, 1987, Kvant-1 soft-docked with the Mir Core Module, but due to an issue could not achieve a hard-dock until April 11th. Kvant-1 delivered an additional solar array which was mounted to the top of the Mir Core Module later in June. It was the only module not designed with a propulsion system, nor a Lyappa arm as it was not originally planned to dock with the station.

Between the years of 1989 and 1996, the modules Kvant-2, Kristall, Spektr and Priroda docked with the Mir Core Module, and each utilised their Lyappa arm to move themselves to their respective docking ports. Kristall was originally positioned opposite of the Kvant-2 module (at the -Y node), though re-positioned itself between the -X node and -Z node before finally remaining at the -Z node.

In 1989, the Kvant-2 module delivered a new on-board computer, being the Salyut 5B, which was an improvement over the Argon 16B computer which was already installed.

In January 1991, Strela, a robotic crane, was installed onto the Mir Core Module by using supports that originally held the launch fairing, which was to assist moving one of Kristall's solar arrays onto Kvant-1. In 1996, another Strela crane was installed opposite to the existing one.

During its lifetime, it was proposed at some point for the Buran to replace the Mir Core Module with a new one, and then return the old one back to earth in its payload bay. However, due to complications such as the dissolution of the Soviet Union and the subsequent funding issues that followed with the Buran programme, this never occurred.

The Mir Core Module, along with the rest of the station, re-entered and burned up over the Pacific Ocean on March 23rd, 2001.

== Gallery ==
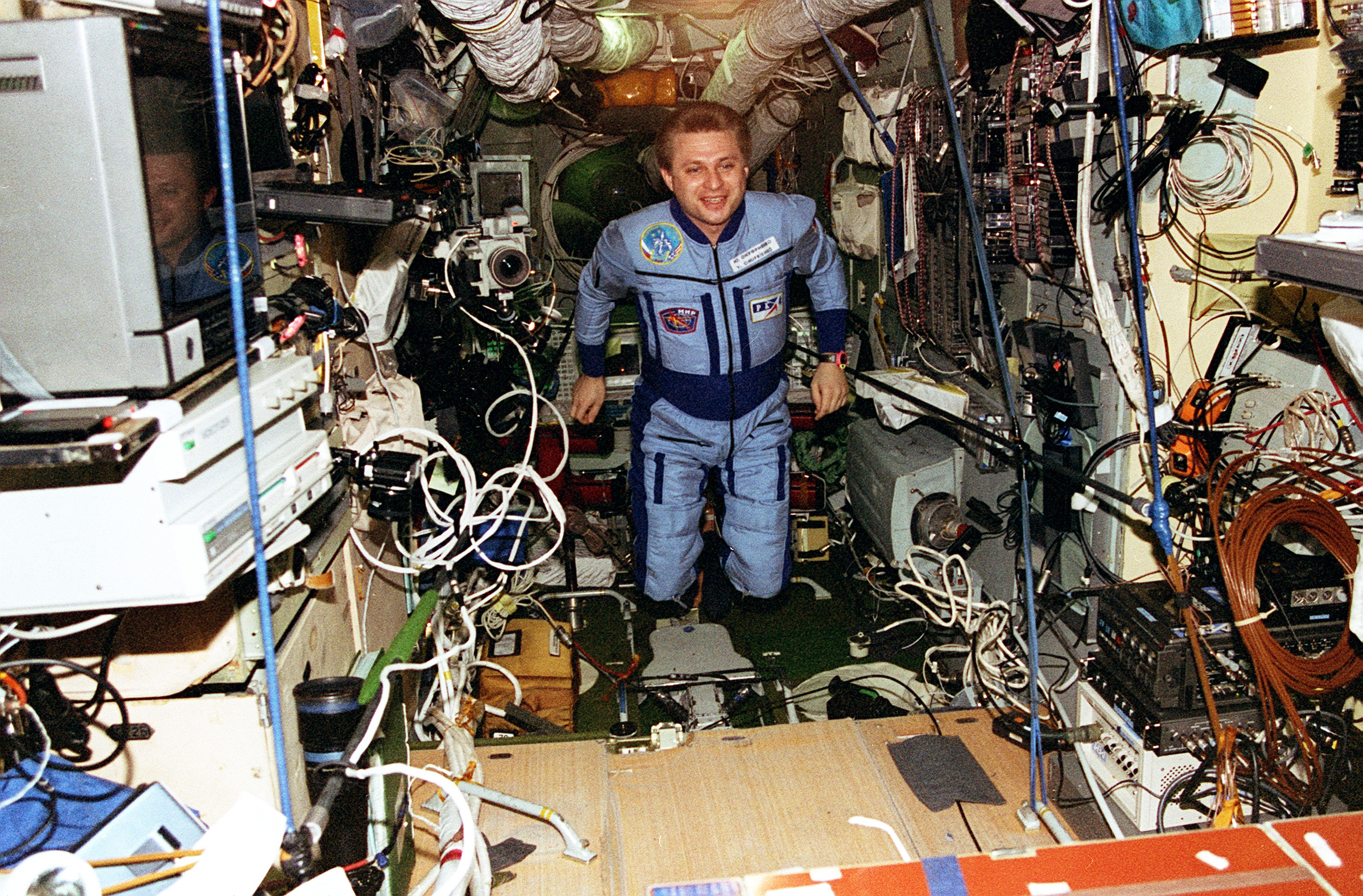
Interior of the Mir Core Module

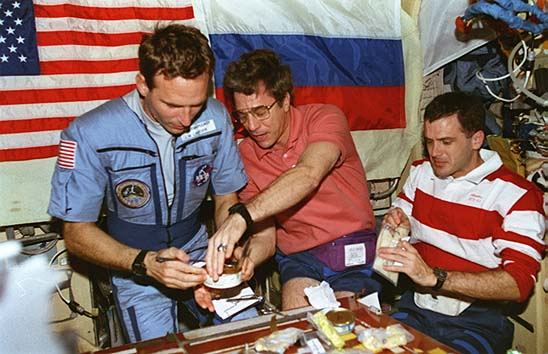
Mealtime inside the Mir Core Module

== See also ==
- Salyut programme
- Shuttle–Mir programme
- Mir-2
