= Kristall =

Mir space station module

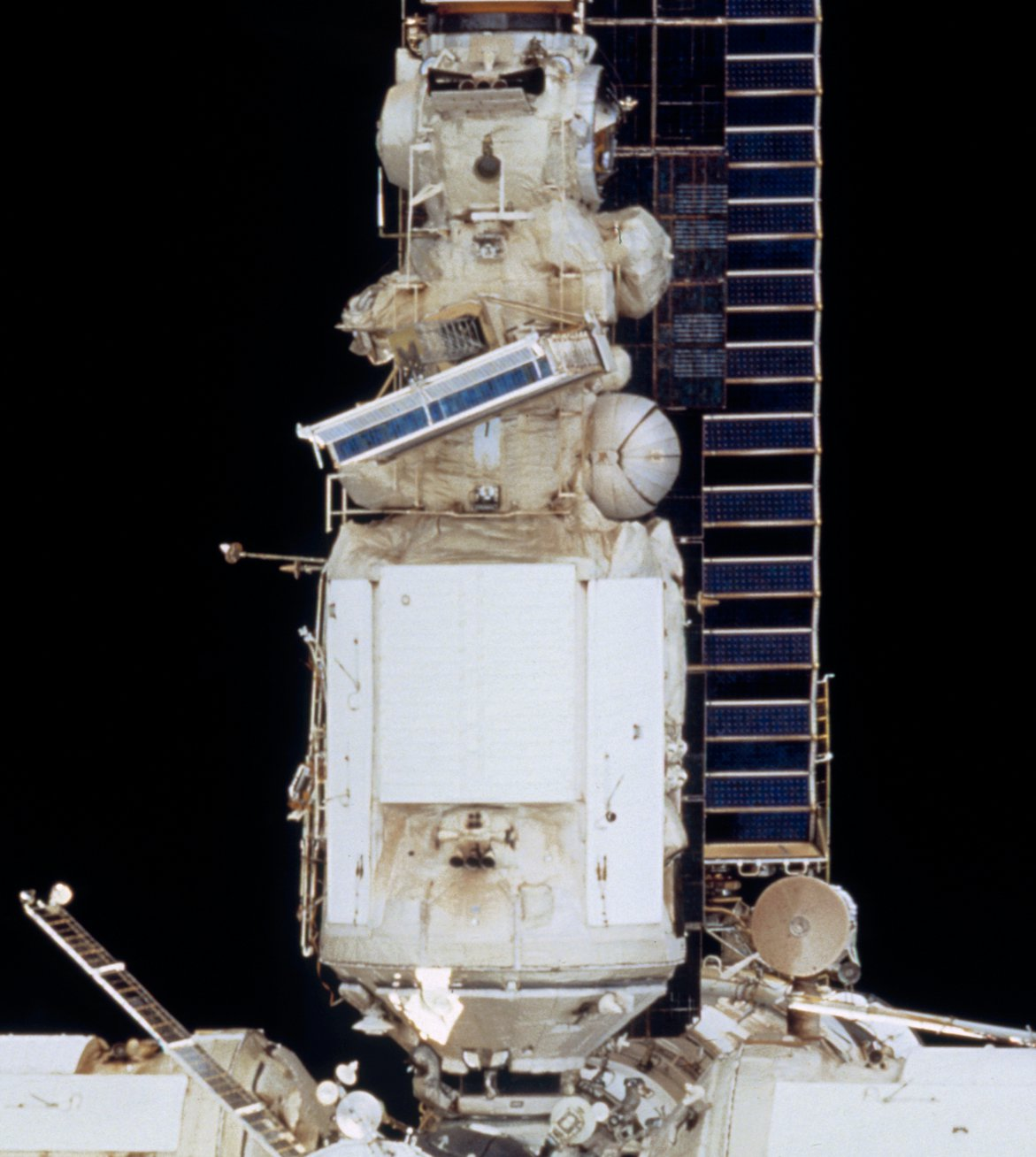
- Kristall in 1997

Module statistics
- COSPAR ID: 1990-048A
- Part of: Mir
- Launch date: May 31, 1990 (UTC)
- Launch vehicle: Proton-K
- Docked: June 10, 1990 (UTC)
- Reentry: March 23, 2001
- Mass: 19,640 kg (43,300 lb)
- Length: 11.9 m (39 ft)
- Diameter: 4.35 m (14.3 ft)
- Pressurised volume: 60.8 m^{3} (2,150 cu ft)

Configuration
- Diagram of Kristall in its original configuration.

Kristall (Russian: Кристалл, lit. 'Crystal'), was the second module on the Mir space station. It was the second module to be installed on Mir. It was launched May 31, 1990 on a Proton-K and docked autonomously on June 10, 1990.

== Design ==
Kristall, like previous modules on Mir, was based on the 77K (TKS) design. The module was designed with the Buran programme in mind, with the aft node having two APAS-89 docking ports.

The module contained several materials processing furnaces, a biotechnology experiment, a hothouse for growing plants like radishes and lettuce, two cameras for earth resource experiments, an ultraviolet telescope augmenting the one installed on Kvant-1, a gamma ray telescope, a gamma spectrometer, a magnetic spectrometer, and an astrophysical spectrometer. The biotechnology and furnace experiments were capable of generating up to 100kg of raw materials for use back down on Earth. The hothouse successfully grew Brassica rapa in 1997.

Additionally, Kristall carried six gyroscopes for attitude control and to augment those already installed on the station, and most notably had 2 collapsible solar arrays, which were designed to be retracted and re-deployed up to several times. One of these arrays was later installed on Kvant-1 consequently due to the Shuttle–Mir programme, and was later disposed of in November 1997. The other solar array was never moved, and remained partially deployed for the rest of its lifetime.

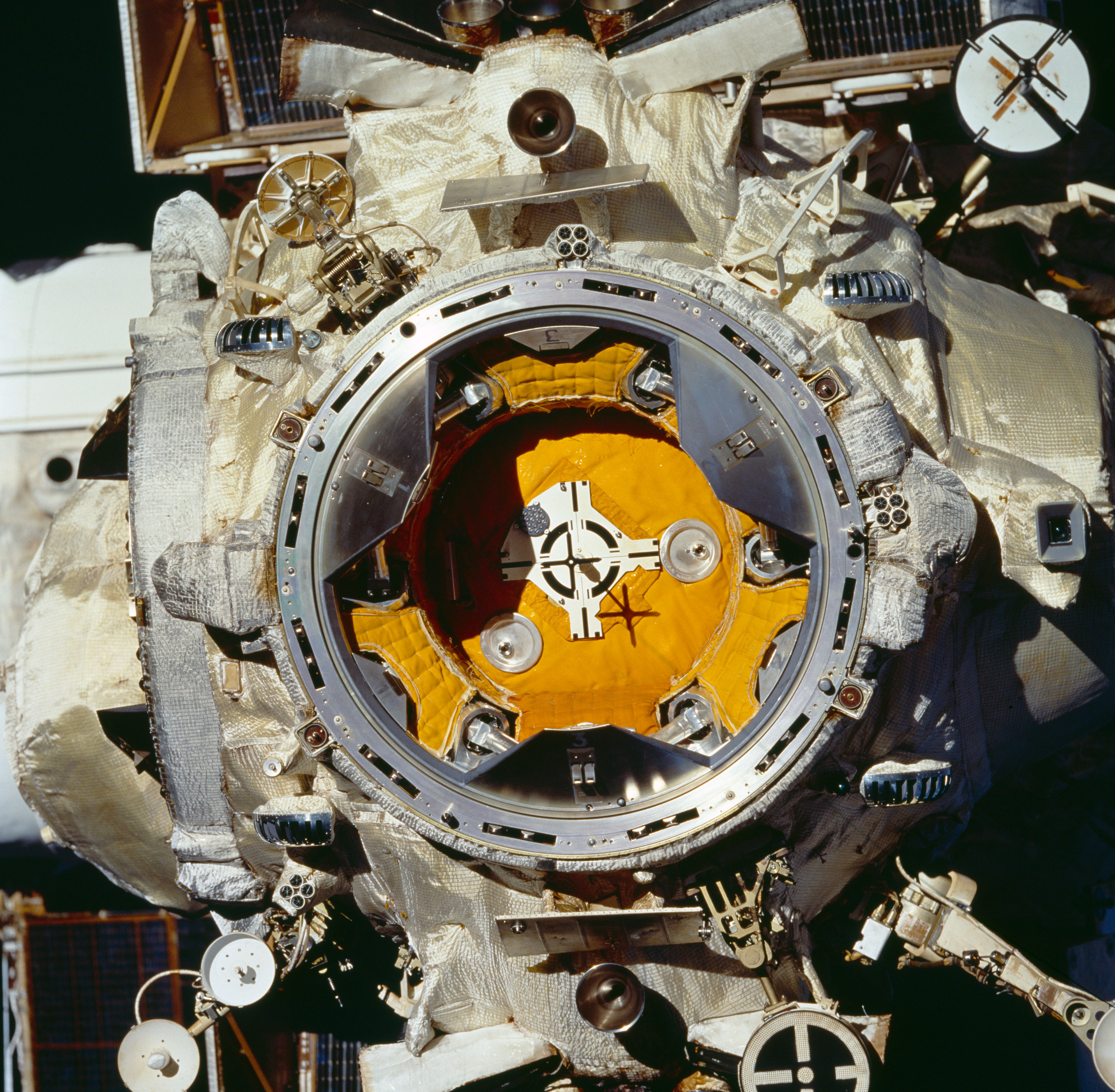
APAS-89 docking mechanisms on Kristall

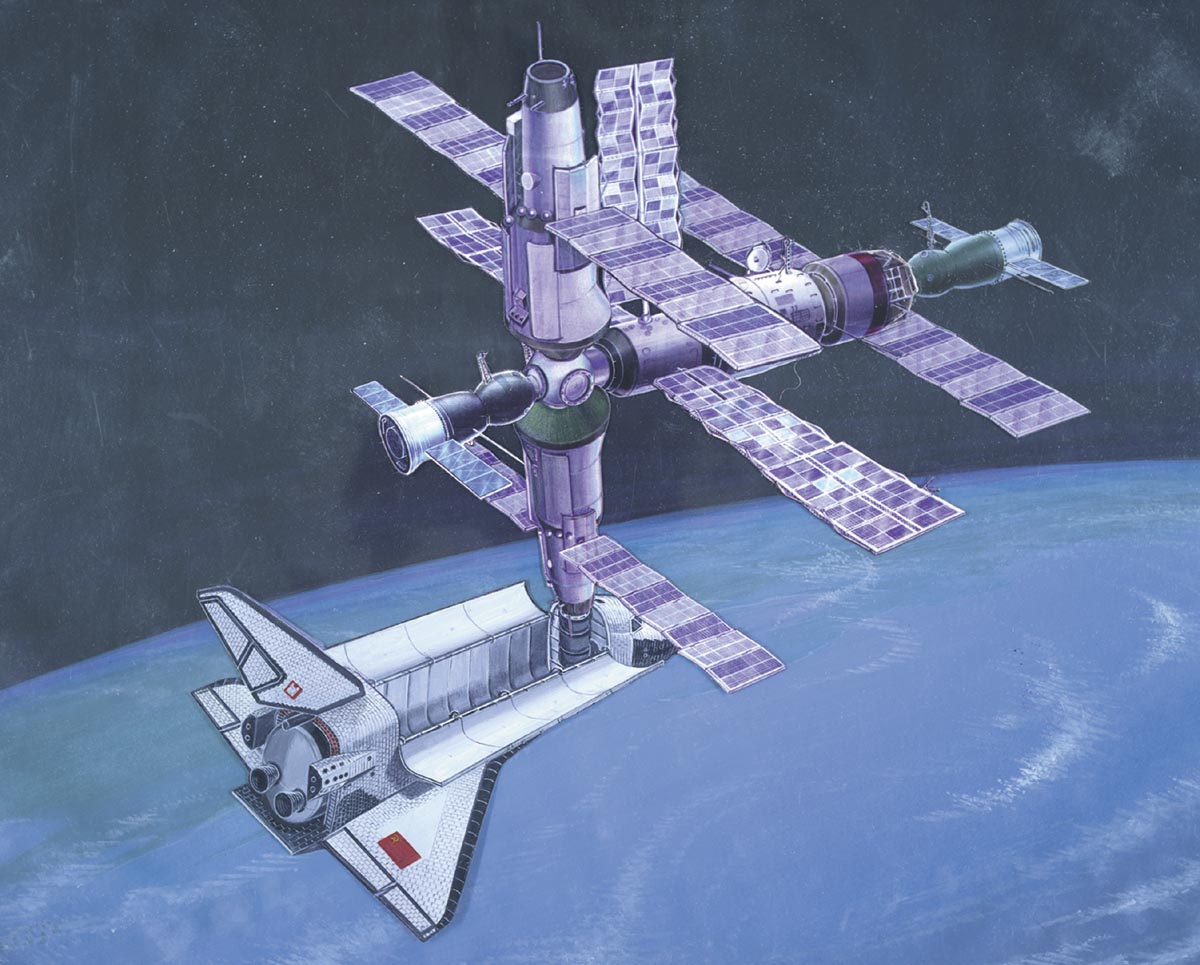
Depiction of the Buran docked with Mir.

== Relation to Buran programme ==
As mentioned, Kristall was designed in relation with the Buran programme, and carried two APAS-89 docking ports which were designed to be compatible with the Buran shuttle. After the Buran programme was cancelled, the lateral docking node was used in conjunction with the Shuttle–Mir program, the radial port never seeing use. The lateral port in 1993, before being docked with the shuttle, was tested by Soyuz TM-16, which was modified to use an APAS-89 docking port rather than the standard SSVP docking system.

As a result of the Shuttle–Mir programme, Kristall was moved from the -Y node on the Mir core module, and moved between the -X node and -Z node before finally remaining at the -Z node, and with the arrival of STS-74, the Mir docking module was attached to Kristall permanently on its lateral docking node.
