= Soyuz TM-16 =

1993 Russian crewed spaceflight to Mir

- Operator: Rosaviakosmos
- COSPAR ID: 1993-005A
- SATCAT no.: 22319
- Mission duration: 179 days, 43 minutes, 45 seconds
- Orbits completed: ~2,790

Spacecraft properties
- Spacecraft: Soyuz 7K-STM No. 101
- Spacecraft type: Soyuz-TM
- Manufacturer: NPO Energia
- Launch mass: 7,150 kilograms (15,760 lb)

Crew
- Crew size: 2 up 3 down
- Members: Gennadi Manakov; Alexander Poleshchuk
- Landing: Jean-Pierre Haigneré
- Callsign: Вулка́н (Vulkan - Volcano)

Start of mission
- Launch date: 24 January 1993, 05:58:05 UTC
- Rocket: Soyuz-U2

End of mission
- Landing date: 22 July 1993, 06:41:50 UTC
- Landing site: 140 kilometres (87 mi) S of Dzhezkazgan

Orbital parameters
- Reference system: Geocentric
- Regime: Low Earth
- Perigee altitude: 393 kilometres (244 mi)
- Apogee altitude: 394 kilometres (245 mi)
- Inclination: 51.6 degrees

Docking with Mir
- Docking date: 26 January 1993, 07:31:17 UTC
- Undocking date: 22 July 1993, 3:00:30 UTC
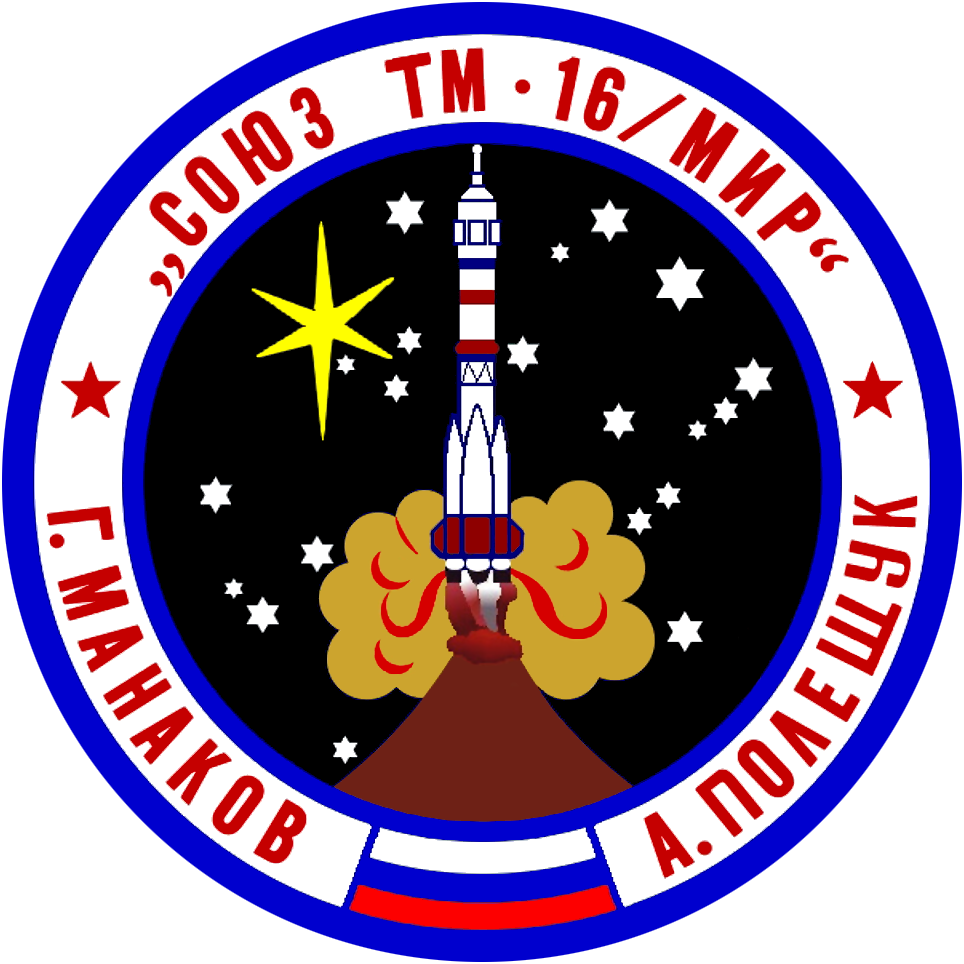
- Soyuz programme (Crewed missions)

Soyuz TM-16 was the sixteenth expedition to the Russian Space Station Mir.

The Soyuz-TM crew transports (T - транспортный - Transportnyi - meaning transport, M - модифицированный - Modifitsirovannyi- meaning modified) were fourth generation (1986–2002) Soyuz spacecraft used for ferry flights to the Mir and ISS space stations. It added to the Soyuz-T new docking and rendezvous, radio communications, emergency and integrated parachute/landing engine systems. The new Kurs rendezvous and docking system permitted the Soyuz-TM to maneuver independently of the station, without the station making "mirror image" maneuvers to match unwanted translations introduced by earlier models' aft-mounted attitude control

== Crew ==
Position	Launching crew	Landing crew
Commander	Gennadi Manakov; Second and last spaceflight	
Flight engineer	Alexander Poleshchuk; Only spaceflight	
Research cosmonaut	None	Jean-Pierre Haigneré, CNES; First spaceflight

== Mission highlights ==
Soyuz TM-16 shown with the APAS-89 docking mechanism

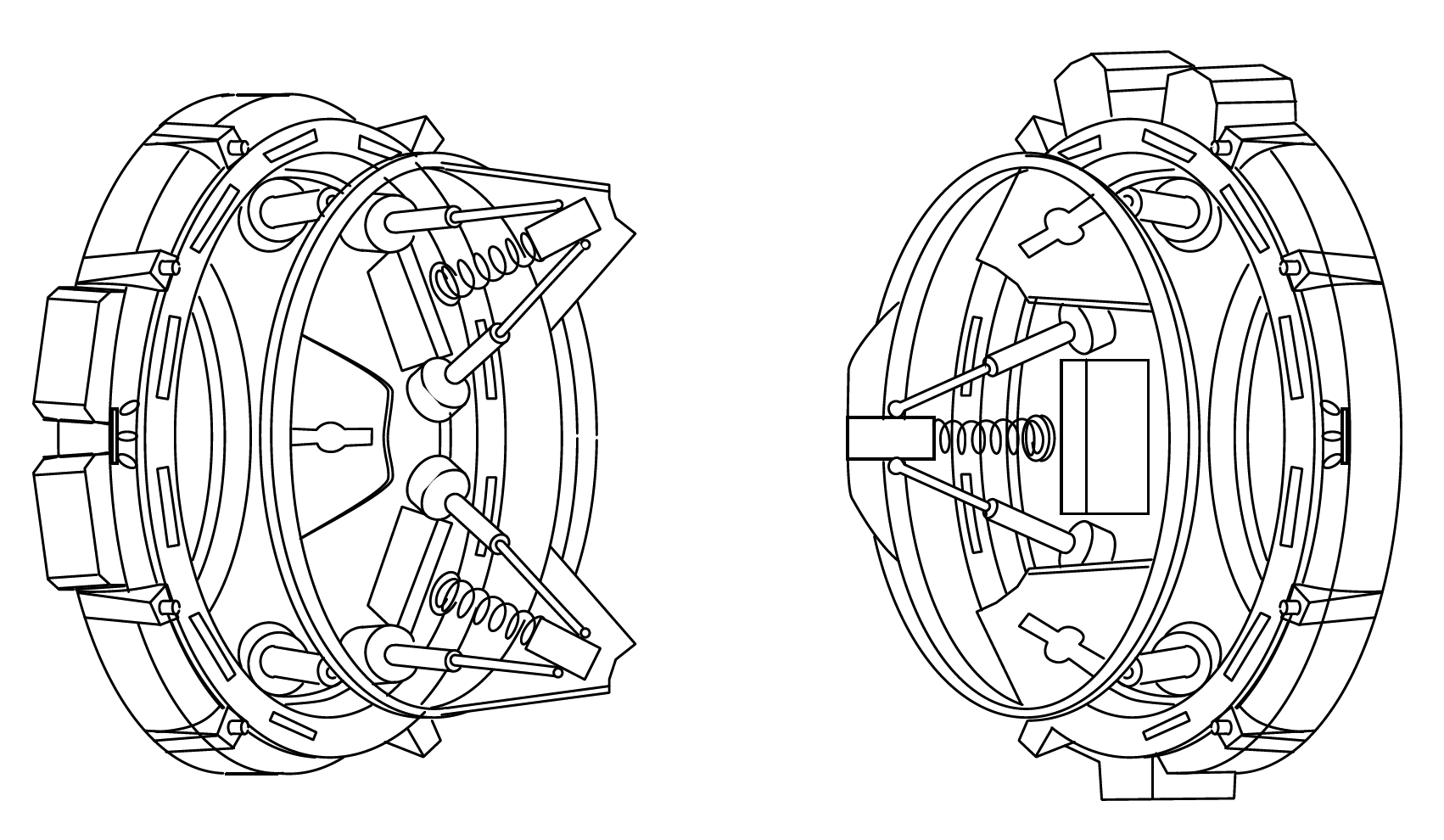
APAS-89

16th expedition to Mir.

First Soyuz without a probe and drogue docking system since 1976. It carried an APAS-89 androgynous docking unit different from the APAS-75 unit used for ASTP in 1975, yet similar in general principles. Soyuz-TM 16 used it to dock with an androgynous docking port on the Kristall module. This was a test of the docking system in preparation for dockings by the Space Shuttles with Mir.
