= Aleksandr Poleshchuk =

Russian cosmonaut (born 1953)

- Александр Полещук
- Born: 30 October 1953 (age 72); Cheremkhovo, Russian SFSR, Soviet Union
- Occupation: Flight engineer
- Space career

Roscosmos cosmonaut
- Status: Retired
- Rank: Captain, Russian Air Force
- Time in space: 179d 00h 43m
- Selection: 1989
- Total EVAs: 2
- Total EVA time: 9h, 58m
- Missions: Soyuz TM-16 (Mir EO-13)

Aleksandr Fyodorovich Poleshchuk (Russian: Александр Фёдорович Полещук, born October 30, 1953) is a former Russian cosmonaut.

== Biography ==
Born in Cheremkhovo, Irkutsk region, he graduated from the Moscow Aviation Institute in 1977 with a mechanical engineering diploma. He then joined RSC Energia as a test engineer, where he was occupied with perfecting repair and assembly techniques performed during space flights. He has extensive experience in test work under simulated weightlessness conditions. In February 1989 he was selected as a test cosmonaut candidate (1989 Cosmonaut Candidates Class, Group 14, Civil Specialists). From September 1989 to January 1991 he underwent the complete course of general space training and was qualified as a test cosmonaut, and then until March 1992 he undertook advanced training for the Soyuz-TM transport vehicle and Mir station flight.

In 1992 he was selected as the backup flight engineer of the Soyuz TM-15 joint Russian-French mission, and consequently nominated as the flight engineer of the prime crew of Soyuz TM-16. In space from January 24 to July 22, 1993, he participated in a 179-day space flight with Gennady Manakov. During the flight he performed two EVAs totaling 9 hours and 58 minutes. Also testing of the androgynous peripheral docking subassembly of the Kristall module was performed.

October 1994 to March 1995 he trained as back-up flight engineer for the Soyuz TM-21 transport vehicle and Mir Station 18th primary expedition flights.

Poleshchuk is married and has one daughter.

== See also ==
- List of Heroes of the Russian Federation
