= Michael R. Clifford =

American army officer and astronaut (1952–2021)

Michael Clifford
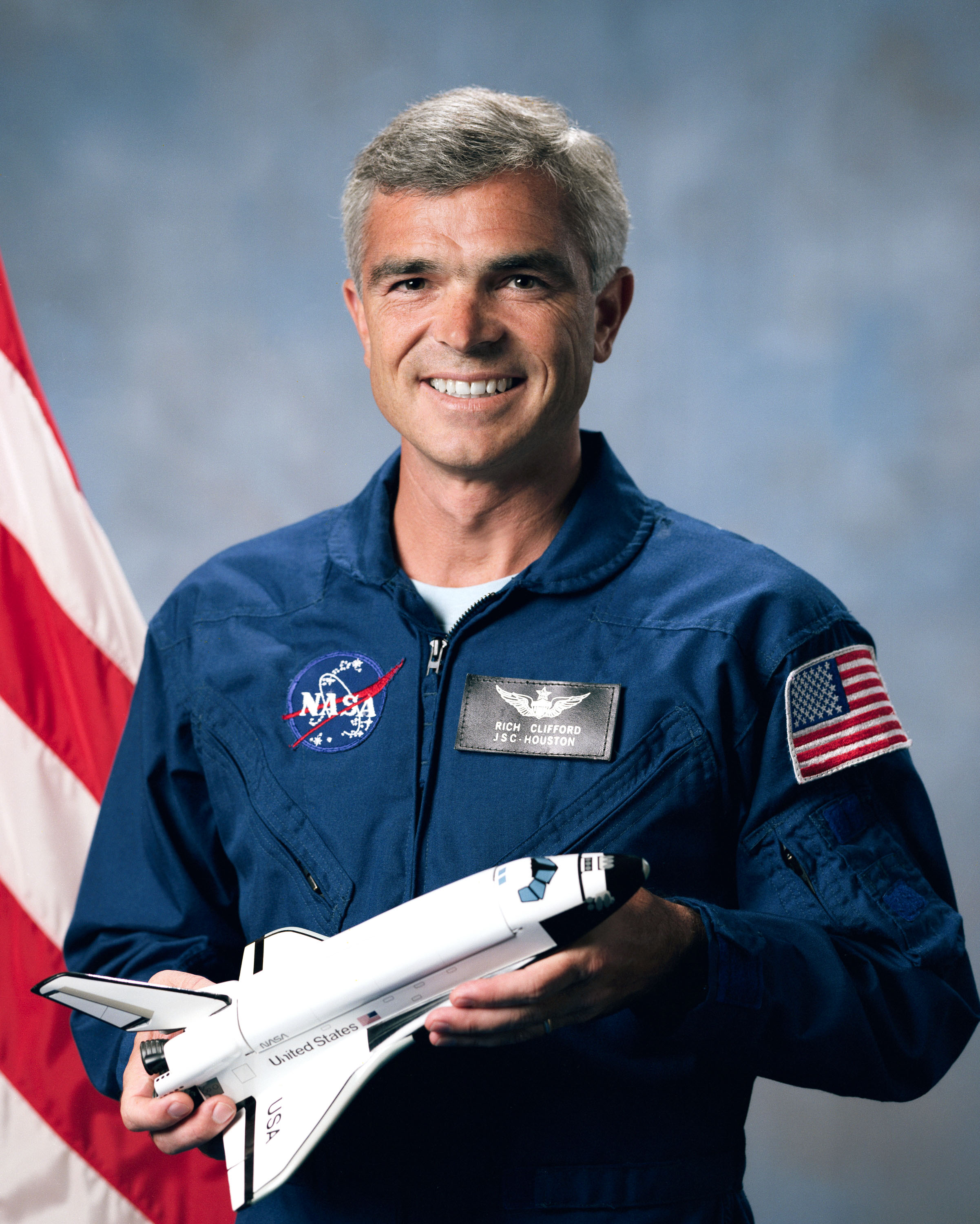
- Clifford in 1990
- Born: Michael Richard Clifford; October 13, 1952; Norton Air Force Base, California, U.S.
- Died: December 28, 2021 (aged 69)
- Education: United States Military Academy (BS); Georgia Institute of Technology (MS)
- Space career

NASA astronaut
- Rank: Lieutenant Colonel, USA
- Time in space: 27d 18h 24m
- Selection: NASA Group 13 (1990)
- Total EVAs: 1
- Total EVA time: 6h, 02m
- Missions: STS-53; STS-59; STS-76
- Retired: January 1997

Michael Richard Clifford (October 13, 1952 – December 28, 2021) was a United States Army officer and NASA astronaut. Clifford was a Master Army Aviator and logged over 3,400 hours flying in a wide variety of fixed and rotary winged aircraft. He retired from the U.S. Army at the rank of lieutenant colonel. He logged six hours of spacewalk time over three Space Shuttle missions. He was also one of the first people to conduct a spacewalk while docked to an orbiting space station: that spacewalk was conducted during STS-76, while docked at the Russian space station Mir.

== Early life and education ==
He was born in San Bernardino, California, on October 13, 1952, the son of Lenore (née Chaffin) and her first husband John Michael Uram. His mother subsequently married Gordon Clifford. Rich Clifford graduated from Ben Lomond High School in Ogden, Utah, in 1970. He was a First Class Scout in the Boy Scouts of America. As a youngster, he worked in a gas station using degreasers to clean car engines as well as on a farm.

Clifford received a Bachelor of Science degree from the United States Military Academy (USMA) at West Point, New York, in 1974, and a Master of Science degree in Aerospace Engineering from the Georgia Institute of Technology in 1982.

== Army career ==
Clifford graduated from West Point in June 1974 and was commissioned as a second lieutenant in the U.S. Army. He served a tour with the 10th Cavalry in Fort Carson, Colorado. At the U.S. Army Aviation School, he was the top graduate of his flight class and was designated an Army Aviator in 1976. He was subsequently assigned for three years as a service platoon commander with the Attack Troop, 2nd Armored Cavalry Regiment in Nuremberg, West Germany. After completing his graduate training in 1982, he was assigned to the USMA Department of Mechanics as an instructor and assistant professor. In December 1986, he graduated from the U.S. Naval Test Pilot School and was designated an experimental test pilot. As a Master Army Aviator, he accumulated more than 3,400 flight hours. In 1995, Clifford retired from the U.S. Army with the rank of lieutenant colonel.

== NASA career ==
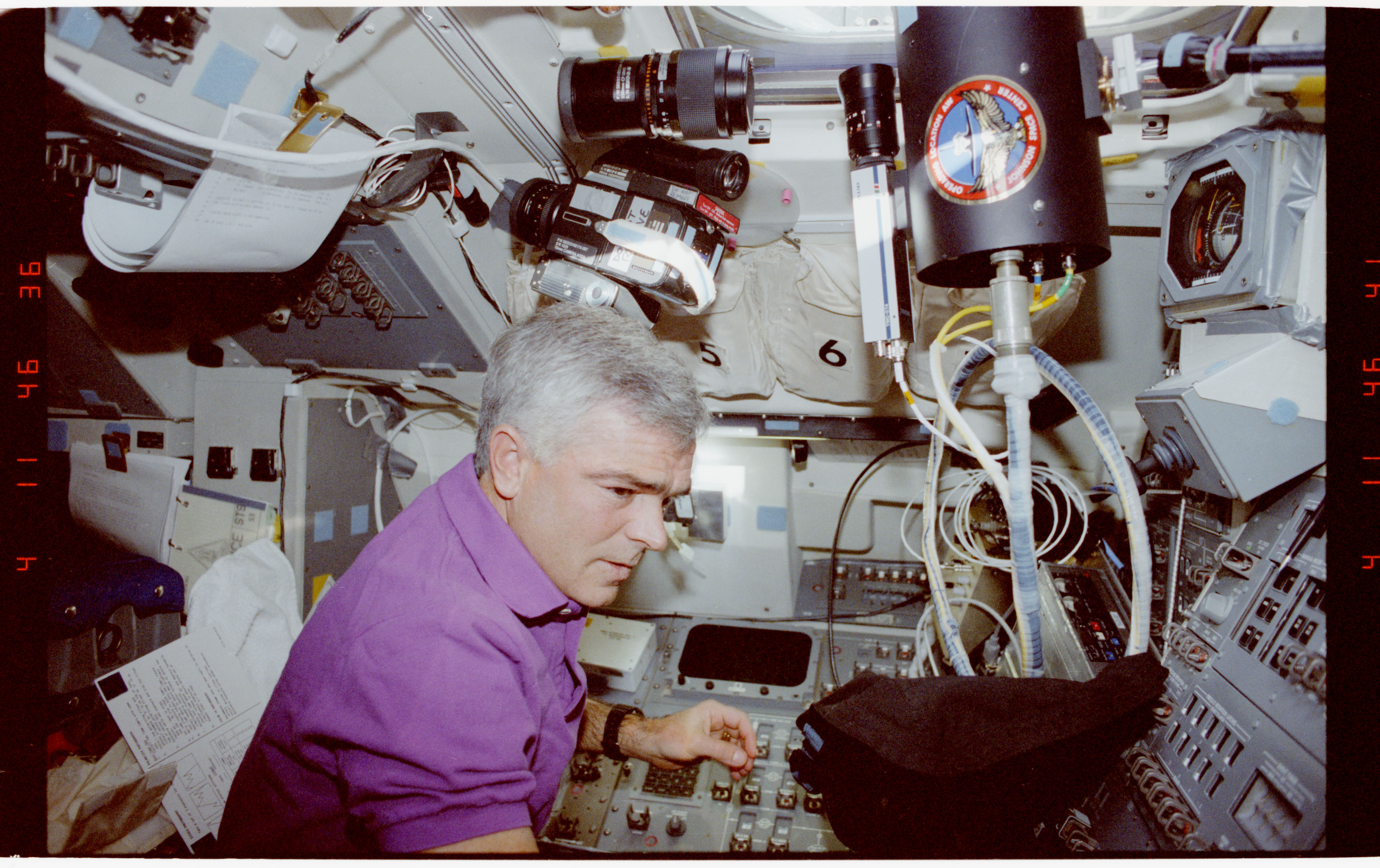
Clifford setting up the experiment equipment for BLAST aboard Discovery during STS-53

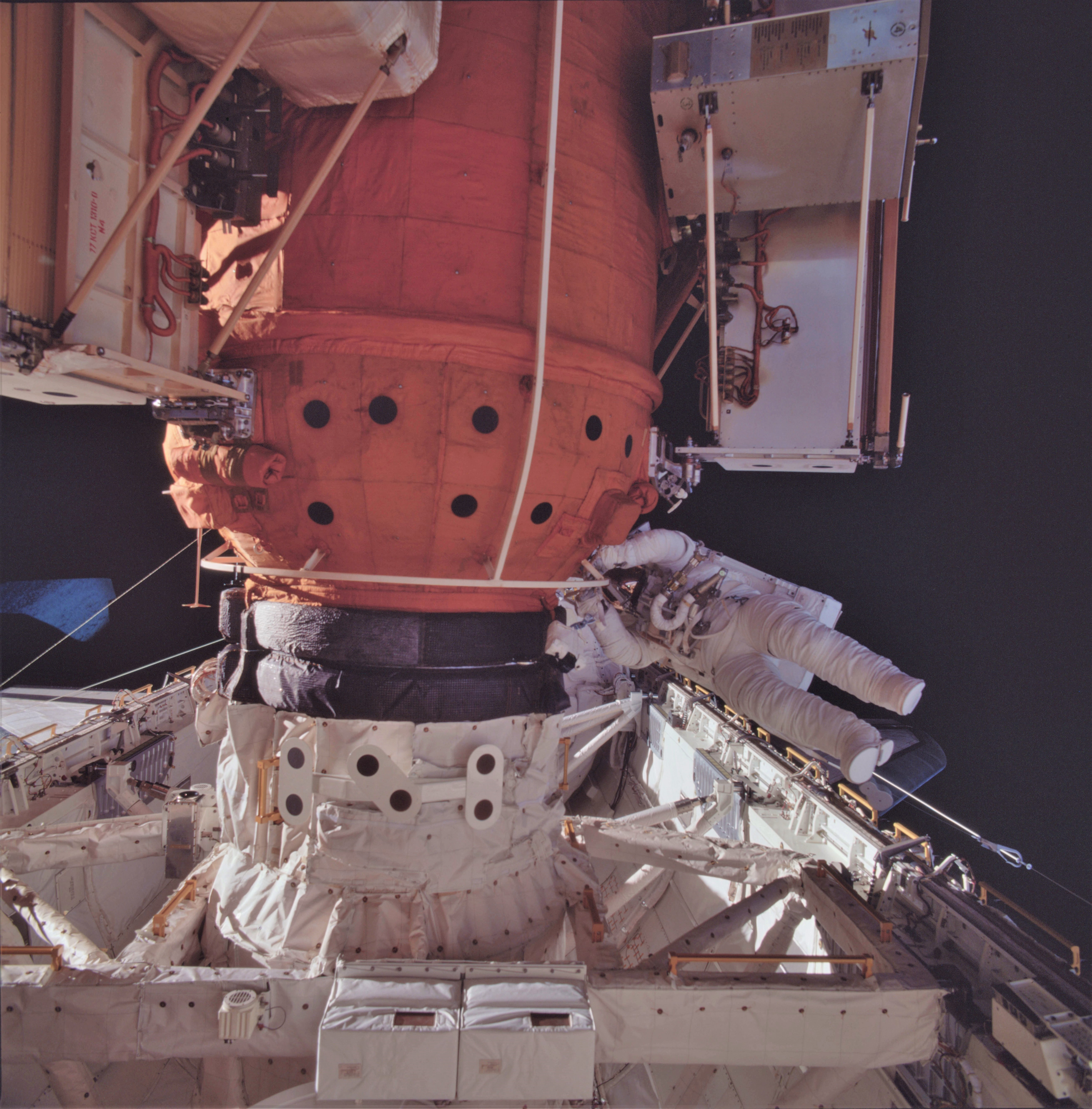
Clifford working at a restraint bar on the Mir Docking Module during his spacewalk on March 27, 1996 during STS-76

As a military officer, Clifford was assigned to the Johnson Space Center in July 1987. As a Space Shuttle Vehicle Integration engineer, his duties involved engineering liaison for launch and landing operations of the Space Shuttle Program; he was involved in design certification and integration of the Shuttle Crew Escape System, and was an executive board member of the Solid Rocket Booster Postflight Assessment Team. Clifford was selected to join NASA Astronaut Group 13 in July 1990. He also served in a variety of technical assignments. From April to August 1991, Clifford was assigned to the Astronaut Office Mission Development Branch where he participated in the design, development, and evaluation of Shuttle payloads and crew equipment having extravehicular activity (EVA) interfaces. From May 1994 to September 1995, he served as lead for space station vehicle/assembly issues. A veteran of three space flights, Clifford flew as a mission specialist on STS-53 in 1992, STS-59 in 1994, and STS-76 in 1996. He has logged 665 hours in space, including a 6-hour spacewalk.

=== STS-53 ===
Flying on the crew of STS-53 which launched from the Kennedy Space Center, Florida, on December 2, 1992, aboard the Space Shuttle Discovery, Clifford became the first member of his 1990 astronaut class. NASA Astronaut Group 13, to reach space. On this mission, he was responsible for a number of experiments, including the Fluid Acquisition and Resupply Experiment (FARE) which he performed with Guion Bluford and Jim Voss He also conducted the Battlefield Laser Acquisition Sensor Test (BLAST) on a novel laser energy detector for the U.S. military. After 116 orbits of the Earth, Clifford returned with the rest of the STS-53 crew, which landed at Edwards Air Force Base, California, on December 9, 1992.

=== STS-59 ===
For his next spaceflight, he served aboard Space Shuttle Endeavour on the STS-59 Space Radar Laboratory (SRL) mission, which launched on April 9, 1994. In this mission, Clifford and five other astronauts worked around the clock on imaging projects using SRL imaging radars, including Spaceborne Imaging Radar, Synthetic-aperture radar, and a carbon monoxide (CO) sensor known as Measurement of Air Pollution from Satellites (MAPS), to collect data on the Earth's surface and atmosphere. The mission concluded on April 20, 1994, with a landing at Edwards Air Force Base after orbiting the Earth 183 times.

He was diagnosed with Parkinson's disease a few months after STS-59 by NASA medical staff and Dr. Joseph Jankovic, a neurologist in Houston. At the time, symptoms were mild and limited to the right arm, which was not swinging naturally.

=== STS-76 ===
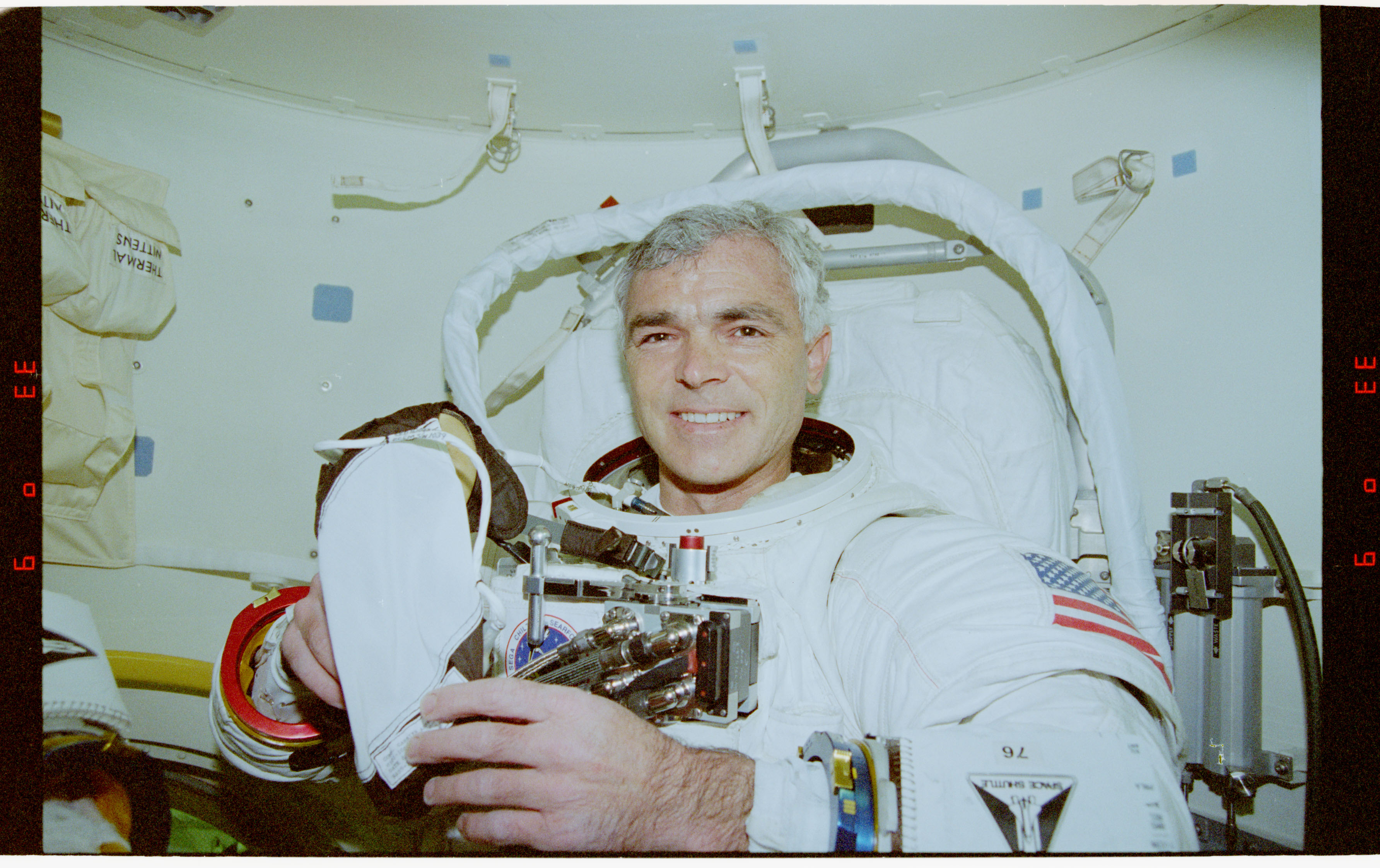
Clifford after the spacewalk in STS-76, getting out of his Extravehicular Mobility Unit (EMU) suit

Despite the Parkinson's diagnosis, Clifford was selected to serve aboard Space Shuttle Atlantis on STS-76, which launched on March 22, 1996. While docked at the Russian space station Mir, Clifford performed a six-hour spacewalk with fellow astronaut Linda M. Godwin to mount experiment packages on the Mir docking module. This was the first spacewalk ever conducted by a NASA crew while a Space Shuttle is docked to an orbiting space station. Prior to the spacewalk, he woke up to music composed by his two sons. Following 145 orbits of the Earth, he returned as Atlantis landed at Edwards Air Force Base in California on March 31, 1996.

After the STS-76 mission, Clifford decided that he should not fly, because he did not know how fast the Parkinson's disease was going to progress.

== Post-NASA career ==
Clifford resigned from the astronaut corps and left NASA in January 1997 to join Boeing's Defense and Space Group as flight operations manager for the International Space Station Program. He later oversaw Boeing's shuttle program till it was winding down. After about 13 years, he left Boeing in September 2011.

== Honors ==
He received the Defense Superior Service Medal, the Legion of Merit, the Defense Meritorious Service Medal, the Army Commendation Medal, National Defense Service Medal with bronze star device, Army Service Ribbon, the National Intelligence Medal of Achievement and the NASA Space Flight Medal. He was a member of the Association of Space Explorers. He received the Award for Public Leadership in Neurology from the American Academy of Neurology in 2012.

== Personal life and death ==
Clifford married Nancy Elizabeth Brunson of Darlington, South Carolina; they had two sons. The Cliffords took up residence in North Myrtle Beach, South Carolina in 2012 and Rich lived there till his death in 2021. According to his wife Nancy, their first granddaughter was "named Eva, which stands for extra vehicular activity. That's his spacewalk".

He was diagnosed with Parkinson's disease in 1994 when he was 42 years old. He suspected that exposures to pesticides used in farms and other chemicals used on car engines since he was a youngster contributed to the early onset of his illness. After retirement from his space career in 1997, he became an advocate for Parkinson's disease awareness and encouraged other patients of the disease to live life to its fullest. Filmmaker Zach Jankovic, son of Dr. Joseph Jankovic who helped diagnose Clifford, made a documentary detailing Clifford's experiences with the disease; the short film entitled The Astronaut's Secret won the American Academy of Neurology Foundation's 2012 annual "Neuro Film Festival" competition and was released in 2014.

Clifford died from complications of Parkinson's on December 28, 2021, at the age of 69.
