= STS-76 =

1996 American crewed spaceflight to Mir

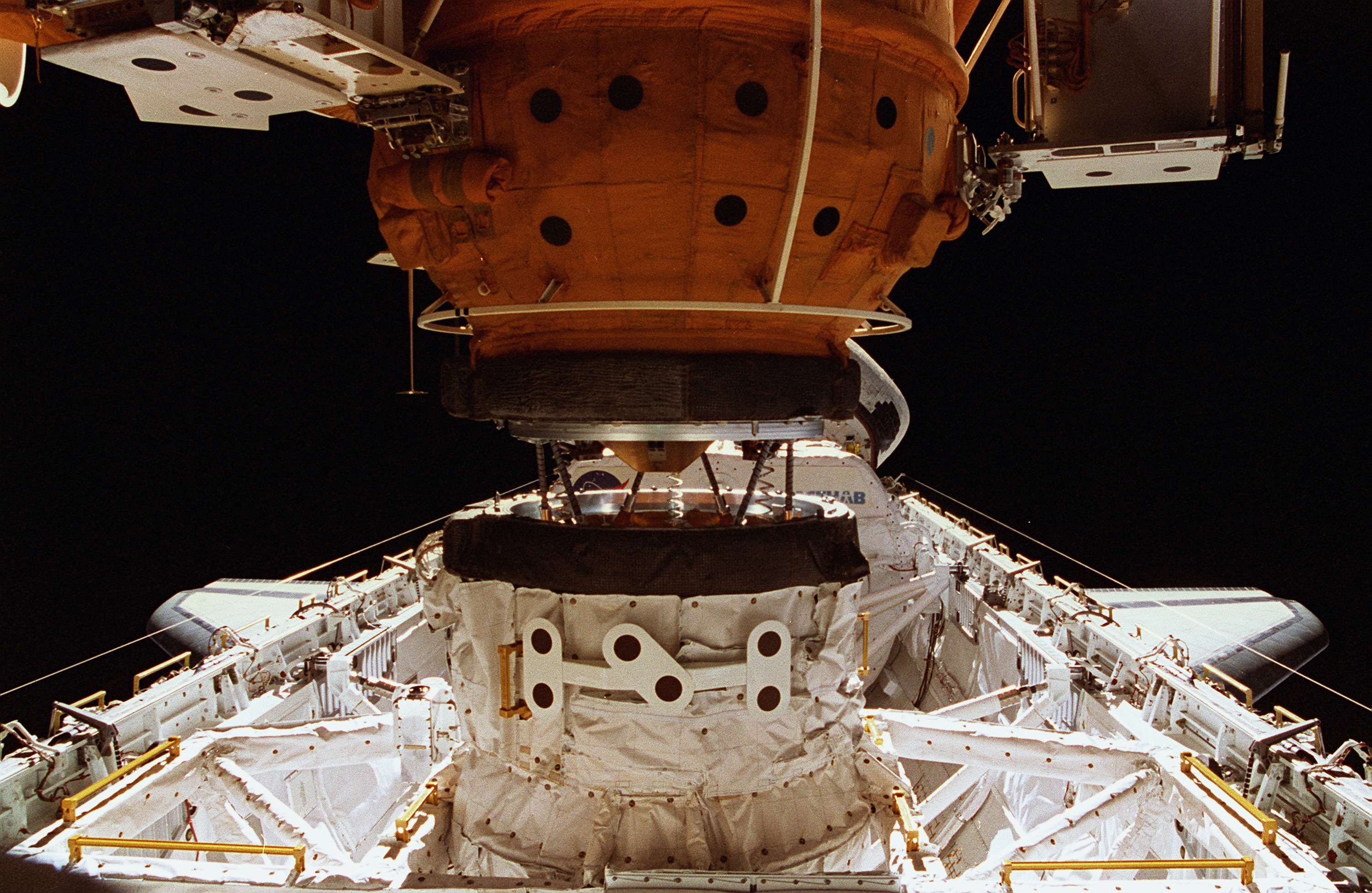
- Atlantis mates with Mir's Docking Module
- Names: Space Transportation System-76
- Mission type: Shuttle–Mir
- Operator: NASA
- COSPAR ID: 1996-018A
- SATCAT no.: 23831
- Mission duration: 9 days, 5 hours, 15 minutes, 53 seconds (achieved)
- Distance travelled: 6,100,000 km (3,800,000 mi)
- Orbits completed: 145

Spacecraft properties
- Spacecraft: Space Shuttle Atlantis
- Launch mass: 111,740 kg (246,340 lb)
- Landing mass: 95,396 kg (210,312 lb)
- Payload mass: 6,753 kg (14,888 lb)

Crew
- Crew size: 6 up 5 down
- Members: Kevin P. Chilton; Richard A. Searfoss; Ronald M. Sega; Michael R. Clifford; Linda M. Godwin
- Launching: Shannon Lucid

Start of mission
- Launch date: 22 March 1996, 08:13:03.999 UTC
- Launch site: Kennedy, LC-39B
- Contractor: Rockwell International

End of mission
- Landing date: 31 March 1996, 13:28:56.8 UTC
- Landing site: Edwards, Runway 22

Orbital parameters
- Reference system: Geocentric orbit
- Regime: Low Earth orbit
- Perigee altitude: 389 km (242 mi)
- Apogee altitude: 411 km (255 mi)
- Inclination: 51.60°
- Period: 92.50 minutes

Docking with Mir
- Docking port: SO starboard
- Docking date: 24 March 1996, 02:50:09.9 UTC
- Undocking date: 29 March 1996, 01:08:03.4 UTC
- Time docked: 4 days, 22 hours, 17 minutes, 54 seconds
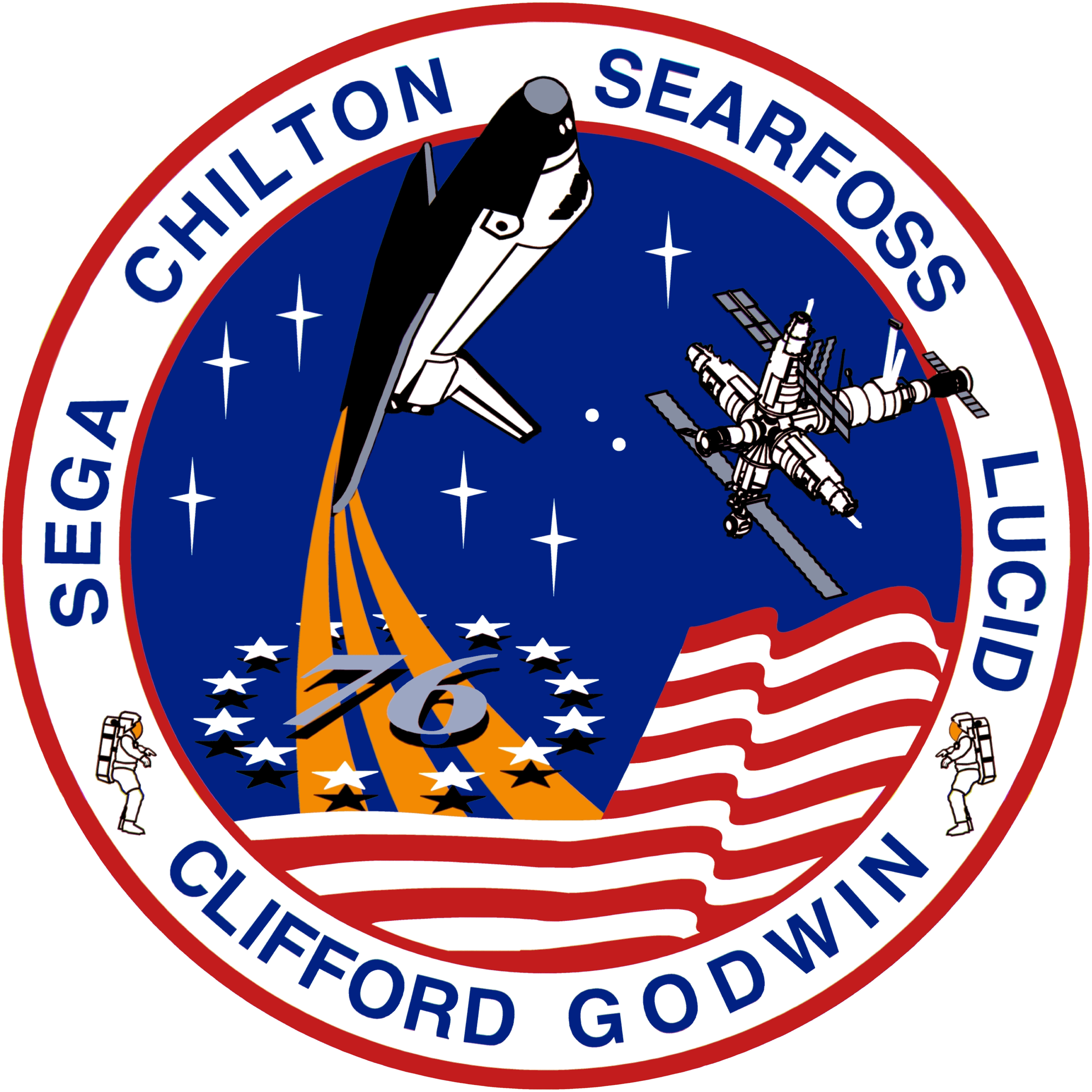
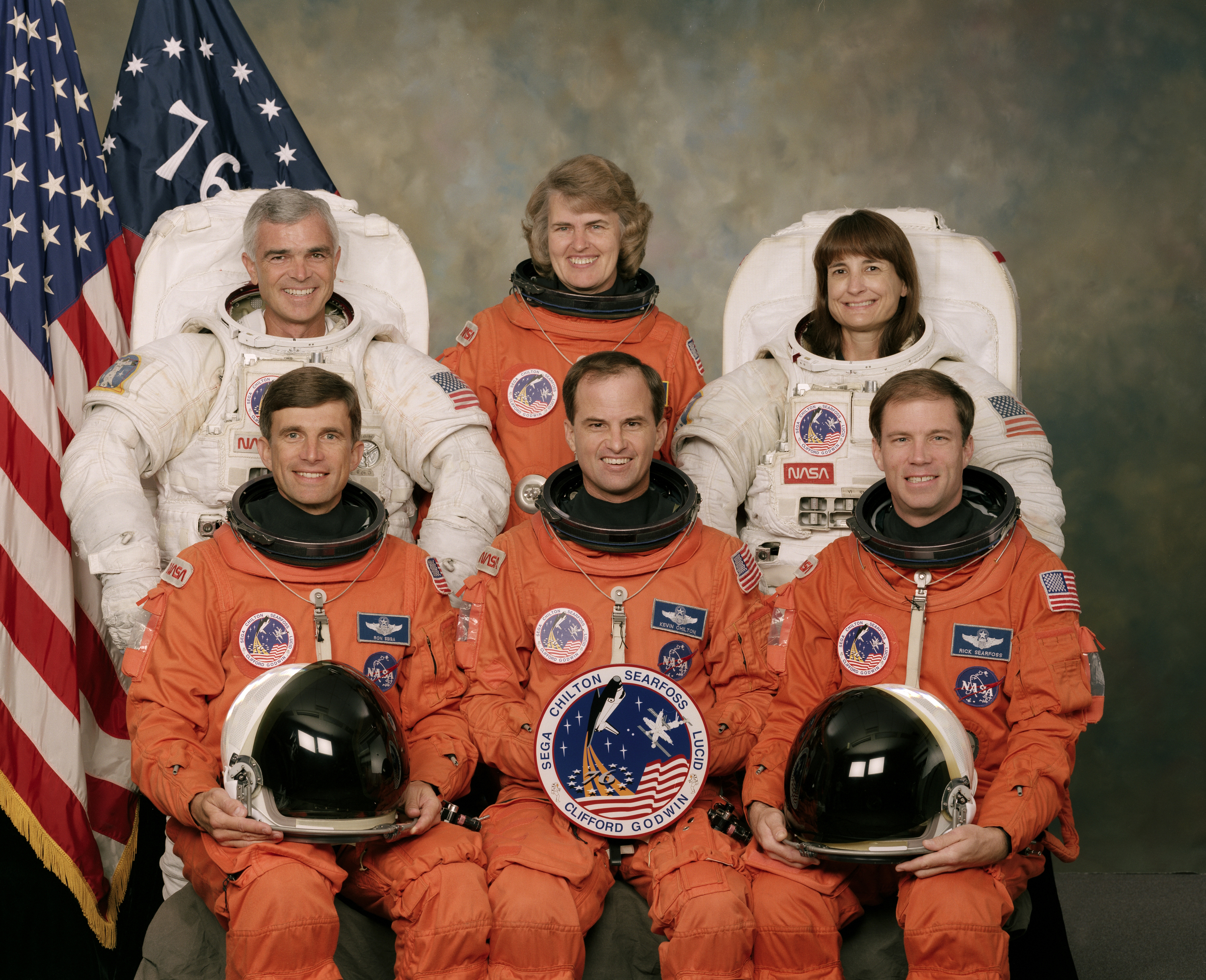
- STS-76 mission patch Back: Clifford, Lucid, Godwin; Front: Sega, Chilton, Searfoss Space Shuttle program

STS-76 was NASA's 76th Space Shuttle mission, and the 16th mission for Atlantis. STS-76 launched on 22 March 1996 at 08:13:04 UTC from Kennedy Space Center, launch pad 39B. STS-76 lasted over 9 days, traveled about 6,100,000 km (3,800,000 mi) while orbiting Earth an estimated 145 times, and landing at 13:28:57 UTC on 31 March 1996 at Edwards Air Force Base, runway 22.

The flight was the third Shuttle mission to dock with the Russian Space Station Mir, as part of the Shuttle–Mir program, carrying astronaut Shannon Lucid to the orbital laboratory to replace NASA astronaut Norman Thagard. STS-76 also carried a SPACEHAB single module along with Lucid, and on flight day 6, Linda M. Godwin and Michael R. Clifford performed the first U.S. spacewalk around two docked spacecraft since the last Skylab mission in 1974.

== Crew ==
Position	Launching Astronaut	Landing Astronaut
Commander	Kevin P. Chilton; Third and last spaceflight	
Pilot	Richard A. Searfoss; Second spaceflight	
Mission Specialist 1	Ronald M. Sega; Second and last spaceflight	
Mission Specialist 2 Flight Engineer	Michael R. Clifford; Third and last spaceflight	
Mission Specialist 3	Linda M. Godwin; Third spaceflight	
Mission Specialist 4	Shannon Lucid; EO-21; Fifth and last spaceflight	None

=== Spacewalks ===
- Godwin and Clifford – EVA 1
- EVA 1 Start: 27 March 1996 – 06:34 UTC
- EVA 1 End: 27 March 1996 – 12:36 UTC
- Duration: 6 hours, 02 minutes

=== Crew seat assignments ===
Seat	Launch	Landing	Seats 1–4 are on the flight deck. Seats 5–7 are on the mid-deck.
1	Chilton		Seats 1–4 are on the flight deck. Seats 5–7 are on the mid-deck.
2	Searfoss		Seats 1–4 are on the flight deck. Seats 5–7 are on the mid-deck.
3	Sega	Godwin	Seats 1–4 are on the flight deck. Seats 5–7 are on the mid-deck.
4	Clifford		Seats 1–4 are on the flight deck. Seats 5–7 are on the mid-deck.
5	Godwin	Sega	Seats 1–4 are on the flight deck. Seats 5–7 are on the mid-deck.
6	Lucid	Unused	Seats 1–4 are on the flight deck. Seats 5–7 are on the mid-deck.

== Mission highlights ==
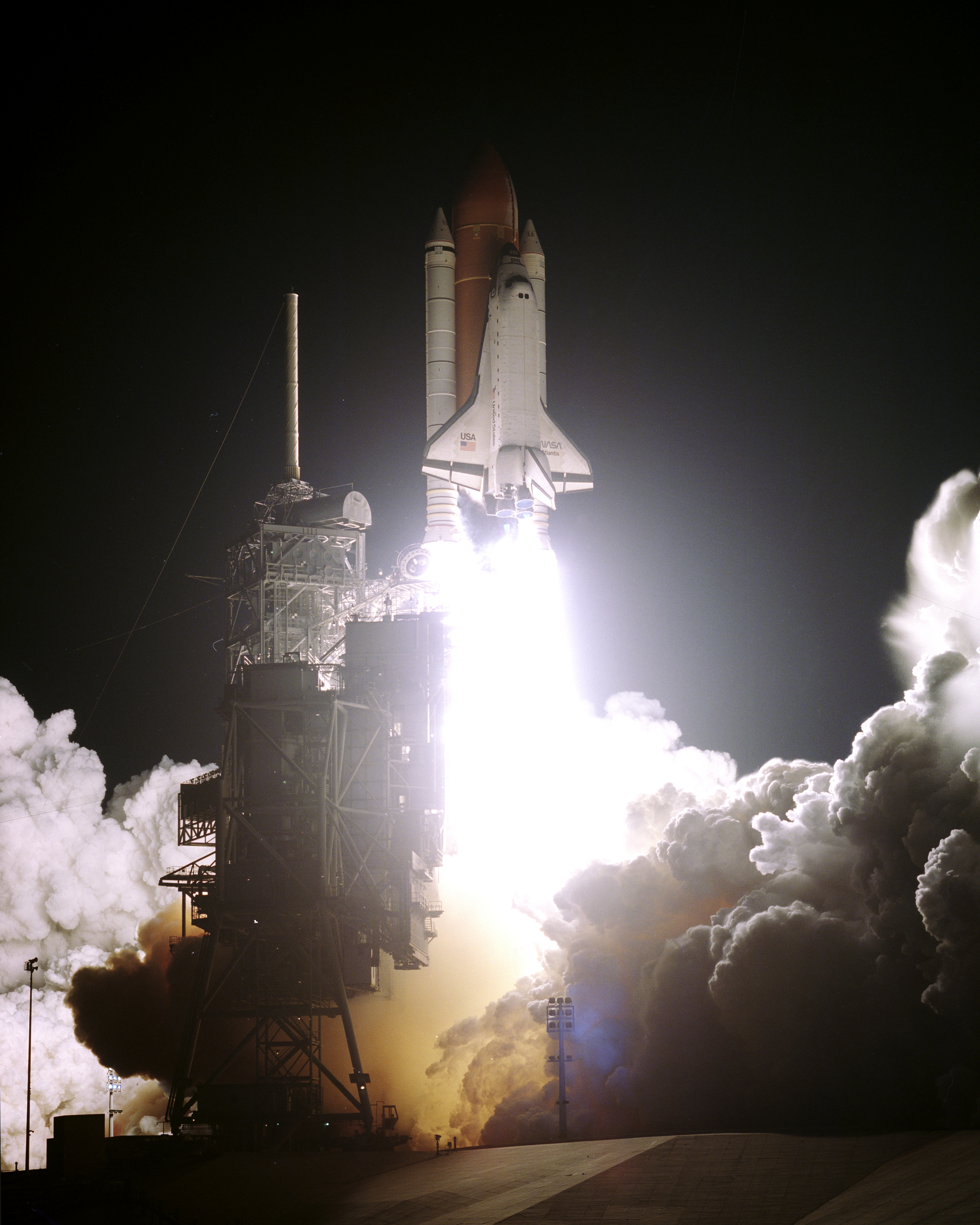
Launch of STS-76

Attempt	Planned	Result	Turnaround	Reason	Decision point	Weather go (%)	Notes
1	21 Mar 1996, 3:35:00 am	Scrubbed	—	Weather	20 Mar 1996, 6:30 pm	20	High winds at KSC and rough seas in SRB recovery area.
2	22 Mar 1996, 3:13:04 am	Success	0 days 23 hours 38 minutes			90	Leak developed in hydraulic system 3 during ascent.

The mission was the third linkup between a U.S. Space Shuttle and Russian space station Mir, and brought veteran astronaut Shannon Lucid to Mir to become the first American woman to live on the station. Her approximately four-and-a-half-month stay also eclipsed the long-duration U.S. spaceflight record set by the first American to live on Mir, Norman Thagard. Lucid was succeeded by astronaut John E. Blaha during STS-79 in August 1996, giving her the distinction of membership in four different flight crews — two U.S. and two Russian—and her stay on Mir kicked off the continuous U.S. presence in space for the next two years.

Payload bay configuration included the Orbiter Docking System in the forward area and a SPACEHAB single module toward the aft. STS-76 marked the first flight of a SPACEHAB pressurized module to support Shuttle-Mir dockings. The single module primarily served as a stowage area for a large supply of equipment for transfer to space station, but also carried the European Space Agency's Biorack experiment rack for on-orbit research.

Atlantis hooked up with Mir on flight day three, following same R-bar approach employed on STS-74. Actual connection between Orbiter Docking System and the Kristall module's docking port occurred at 02:50 UTC on 24 March 1996. Hatches opened a little less than two hours later. Awaiting Atlantis arrival were Mir 21 Commander Yury Onufriyenko and Flight Engineer Yuri Usachov, who were launched to Mir on 21 February 1996. In July, they were joined by Mir 22 Commander Valery Korzun, Flight Engineer Aleksandr Kaleri and CNES astronaut Claudie André-Deshays. After a two-week stay, André-Deshays would return to Earth with Onufriyenko and Usachov while Korzun and Kaleri remained on board with Lucid.

During five days of docked operations, about 680 kg (1,500 lb) of water and two tons of scientific equipment, logistical material and resupply items were transferred to Mir. Experiment samples and miscellaneous equipment brought over to orbiter. In Biorack, 11 separate scientific investigations were conducted. Study topics included the effect of microgravity and cosmic radiation on plants, tissues, cells, bacteria and insects, and the effects of microgravity on bone loss. Also transferred to the station were the Mir Glovebox Stowage (MGBX) equipment to replenish the glovebox already on station, the Queen's University Experiment in Liquid Diffusion (QUELD) flown in the orbiter's middeck locker, and the High Temperature Liquid Phase Sintering (LPS) experiment.

On flight day six, Godwin and Clifford conducted what some claim to be the first U.S. extravehicular activity (EVA) around two mated spacecraft. However, this appears to ignore the Apollo 9 EVA, and EVAs during Skylab. During six-hour, two-minute, 28-second EVA, they attached four Mir Environmental Effects Payload (MEEP) experiments to the station's docking module - designed to characterize the environment around Mir over an 18-month period. Godwin and Clifford wore Simplified Aid For EVA Rescue (SAFER) propulsive devices - first flight-tested during STS-64.

Other payloads included Shuttle Amateur Radio Experiment (SAREX), KidSat, a project that gives middle school students opportunity to participate in space exploration, and Trapped Ions in Space (TRIS), a Naval Research Laboratory experiment flown in a Getaway Special canister in the payload bay.

== Gallery ==
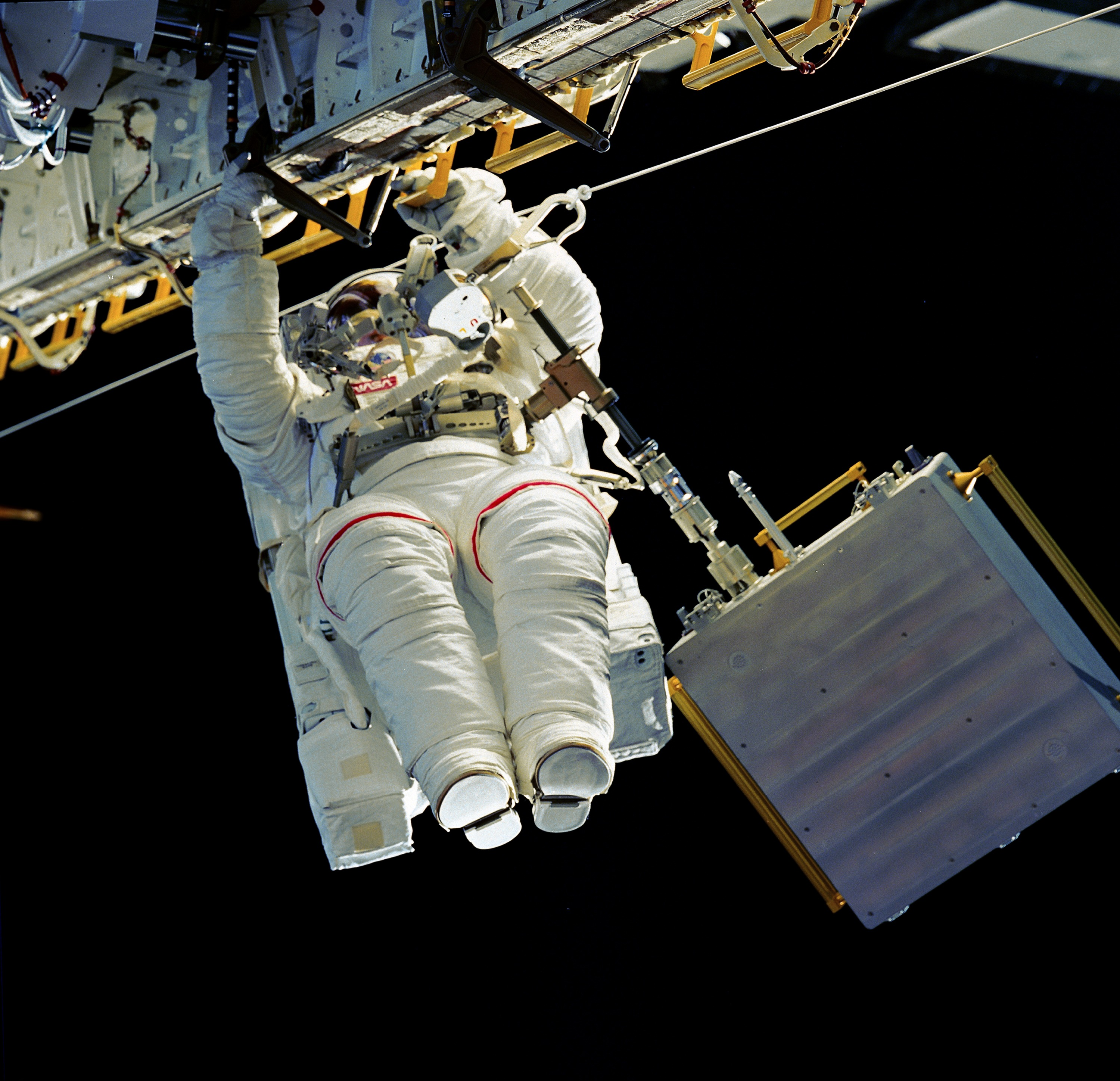
Astronaut Linda M. Godwin translates along the longeron of Atlantis' cargo bay starboard side during EVA 1.

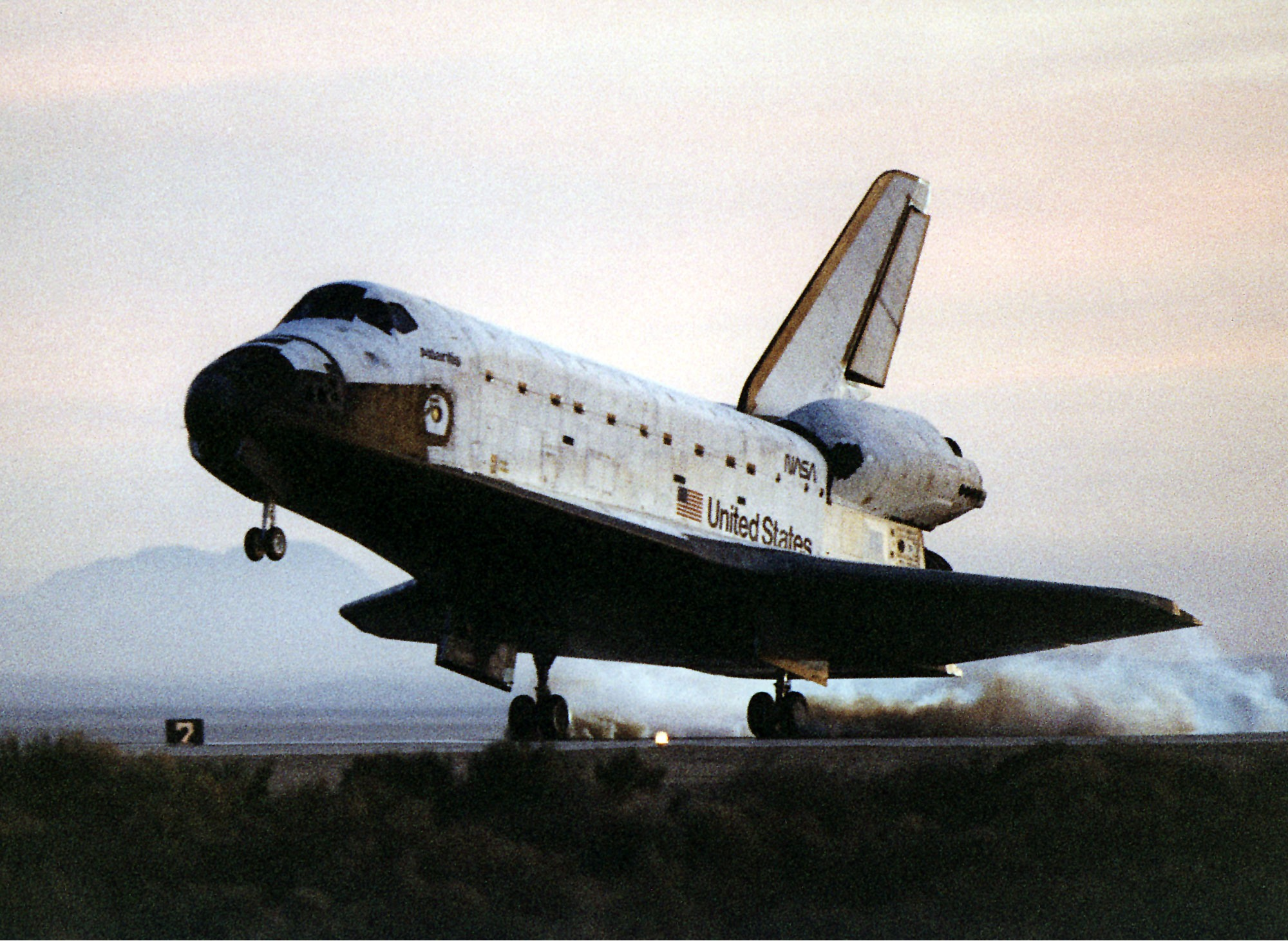
Atlantis lands at the Edwards Air Force Base on 31 March 1996.

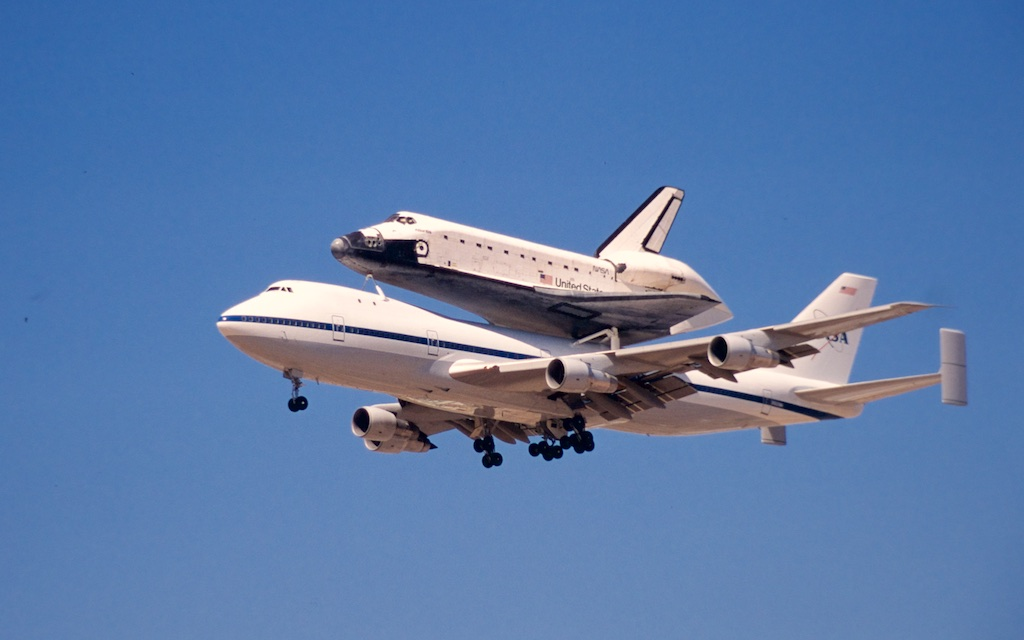
Shuttle Atlantis arriving at Davis–Monthan Air Force Base, Tucson, Arizona during the return trip from Edwards Air Force Base to Kennedy Space Center in April 1996.

== See also ==
- List of human spaceflights
- List of human spaceflights to Mir
- List of Space Shuttle missions
- Outline of space science
