= Sidney M. Gutierrez =

American astronaut (born 1951)

Sid Gutierrez
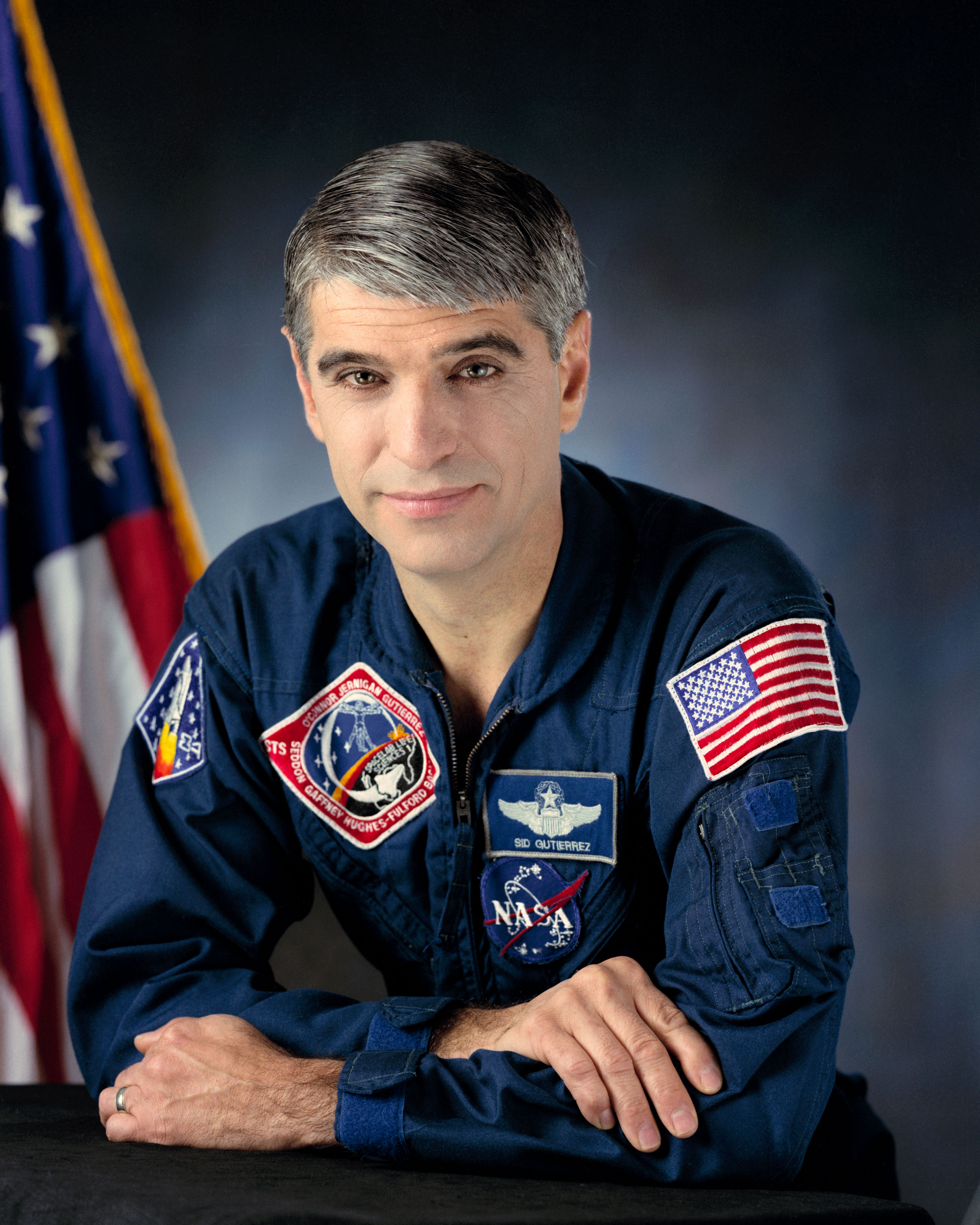
- Born: June 27, 1951 (age 75); Albuquerque, New Mexico, U.S.
- Education: United States Air Force Academy (BS); Webster University (MA)
- Space career

NASA astronaut
- Rank: Colonel, USAF
- Time in space: 20d 8h 3m
- Selection: NASA Group 10 (1984)
- Missions: STS-40; STS-59
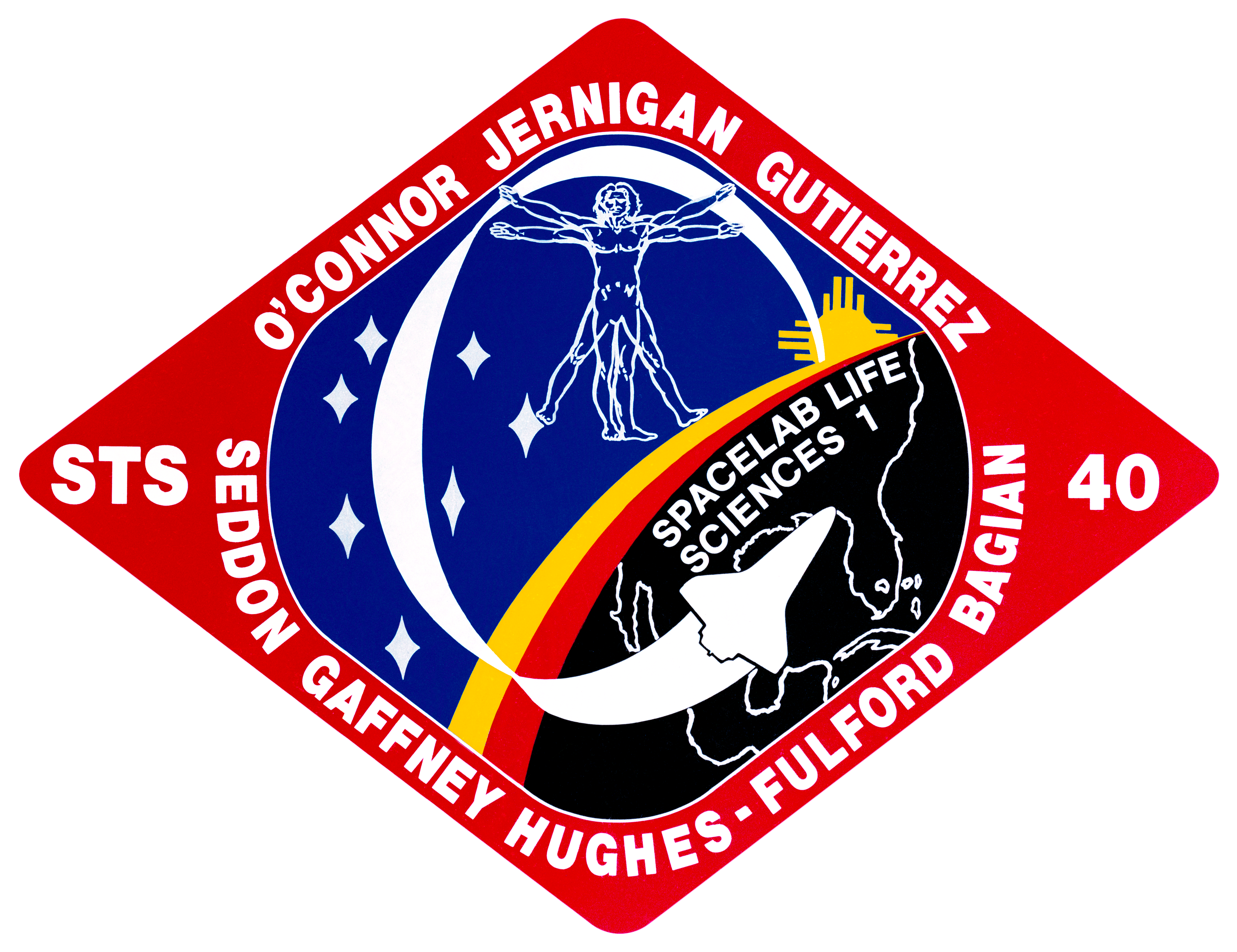
- Mission insignia

Sidney McNeill Gutierrez (Colonel, USAF, Ret.) (born June 27, 1951), is an American pilot and former NASA astronaut. Since retiring from NASA, Gutierrez has worked in several leadership positions at Sandia National Laboratories and Rocket Crafters Inc.

== Early life and education ==
Gutierrez was born in Albuquerque, New Mexico. He graduated from Valley High School in Albuquerque, New Mexico in 1969. He then received his Bachelor of Science degree in aeronautical engineering from the United States Air Force Academy in 1973 and a Master of Arts degree in management from Webster University in 1977.

== Career ==
Gutierrez was a member of the National Collegiate Championship Air Force Academy Parachute Team with over 550 jumps and a Master Parachutist rating. After graduation from the Academy, he completed Undergraduate Pilot Training at Laughlin Air Force Base in Del Rio, Texas. He remained there as a T-38 instructor pilot from 1975 through 1977. In 1978 Gutierrez was assigned to the 7th Tactical Fighter Squadron at Holloman Air Force Base, Alamogordo, New Mexico, where he flew the F-15 Eagle. He attended the USAF Test Pilot School in 1981 and was assigned to the F-16 Falcon Combined Test Force after graduation. While there, Gutierrez served as primary test pilot for airframe and propulsion testing on the F-16 aircraft. Test projects included the F-100 Digital Electronic Engine Cons, F-16C & D Model Structural and Performance Testing, F-16 Maximum Performance Braking Tests, and F-16 Mobile Arrestment Qualification.

He has logged over 4,500 hours flying time in approximately 30 different types of airplanes, sailplanes, balloons, and rockets.

=== NASA experience ===
Selected by NASA in May 1984, Gutierrez became an astronaut in June 1985. In his first technical assignment, he served as commander for the Shuttle Avionics Integration Laboratory (SAIL), flying simulated missions to verify Shuttle flight software. Following the Shuttle Challenger accident he served as an action officer for the Associate Administrator for Space Flight at NASA Headquarters. His duties included coordinating requests from the Presidential Commission and the U.S. Congress during the investigation. In 1986 and 1987, he participated in the recertification of the Space Shuttle Main Engines, Main Propulsion System, and External Tank. In 1988, he became the Astronaut Office lead for Shuttle software development, verification, and future requirements definition. In 1989 he supported launches of STS-28, 30, 32, 33 and 34 at the Kennedy Space Center in Florida.

A veteran of two space flights, he has logged over 488 hours in space. He was the pilot on STS-40 (June 5 – 14, 1991) and was the spacecraft commander on STS-59 (April 9 – 20, 1994). After his first flight, Gutierrez served as spacecraft communicator (CAPCOM) - the voice link between the flight crew and mission control - for STS-42, 45, 46, 49 and 52. In 1992 he became the Astronaut Office Branch Chief for Operations Development, overseeing ascent, entry, abort, software, rendezvous, Shuttle systems, main engines, solid rocket boosters, external tank, and landing and rollout issues.

In September 1994, Gutierrez retired from the U.S. Air Force and NASA, returned to his native home of Albuquerque, New Mexico, and joined Sandia National Laboratories. From September 1994 to March 1995, he served as Manager for their Strategic Initiatives Department. In March he became Manager of the Airborne Sensors and Integration Department in the Exploratory Systems Development Center. He also served as Chairman of the Governor's Technical Excellence Committee Spaceport Task Force.

Gutierrez serves on the board of directors of the Texas-New Mexico Power Company and Goodwill Industries of New Mexico and is a member of the New Mexico Space Center's Governor's Commission.

He is a member of the Society of Experimental Test Pilots, the Air Force Association, the U.S. Air Force Academy Association of Graduates, the Society of Space Explorers, and the New Mexico Institute of Mining and Technology Board of Regents (until January 2007).

=== Space flight experience ===
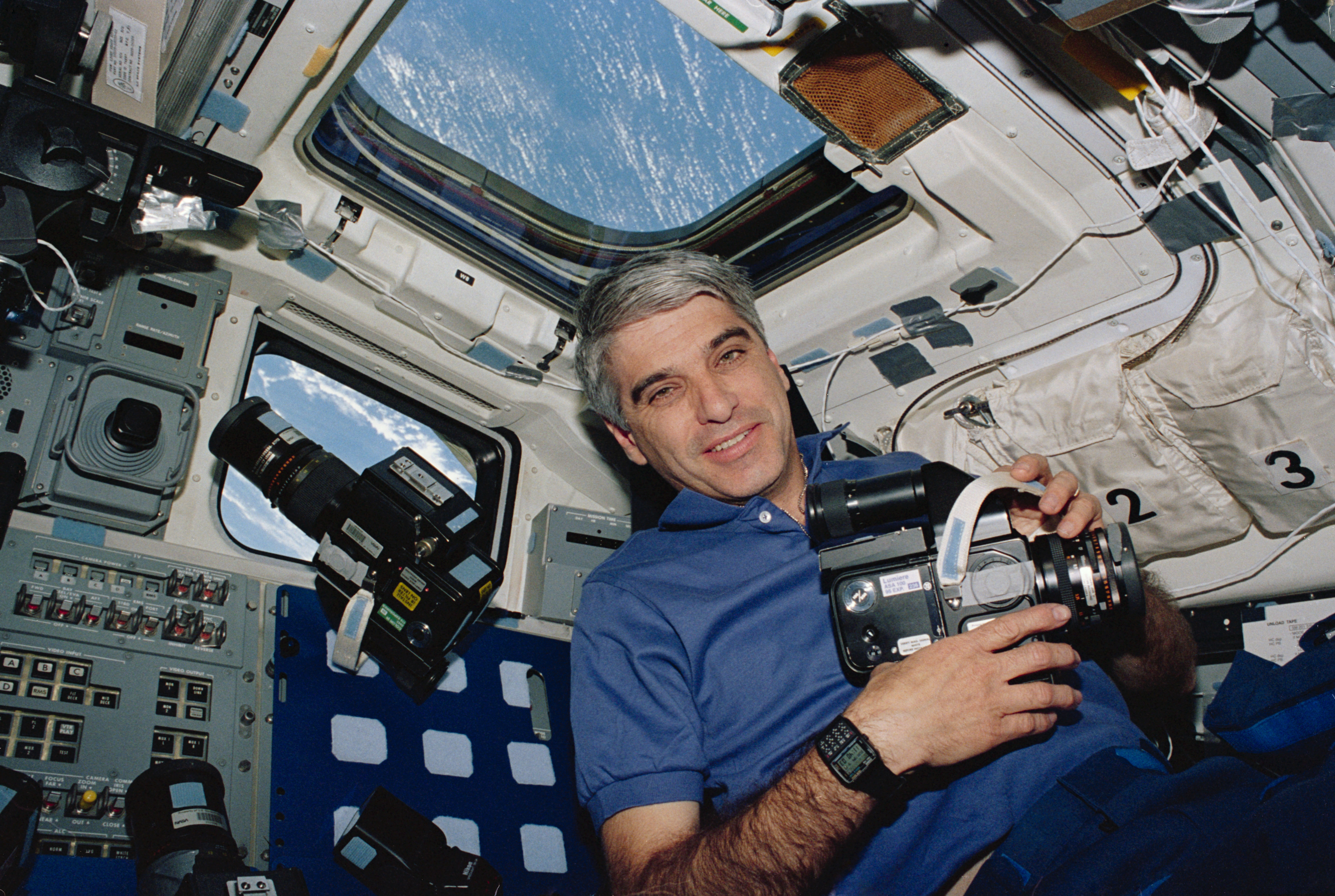
Astronaut Sidney M. Gutierrez, mission commander, pauses on the flight deck during Earth observations on the Space Shuttle Endeavour. Gutierrez, who was joined by five other NASA astronauts for 11-days in Earth orbit, holds a 70mm Hasselblad camera.

STS-40 Spacelab Life Sciences (SLS-1), a dedicated space and life sciences mission, which launched from the Kennedy Space Center, Florida, on June 5, 1991. SLS-1 was a nine-day mission during which the crew performed experiments that explored how humans, animals, and cells respond to microgravity and re-adapt to Earth's gravity on return. Other payloads included experiments designed to investigate materials science, plant biology and cosmic radiation. Following 146 orbits of the Earth, Columbia and her crew returned to land at Edwards Air Force Base, California, on June 14, 1991. Mission duration was 218 hours, 14 minutes, 20 seconds.

STS-59 Space Radar Laboratory (SRL-1), part of Mission to Planet Earth, was an eleven-day flight dedicated to the study of the Earth and the atmosphere around it. The two primary payloads were the Spaceborne Imaging Radar-C/X-band Synthetic Aperture Radar (SIR-C/X-SAR), and Measurement of Air Pollution from Space (MAPS). The crew completed over 400 precise maneuvers (a Shuttle record) to properly point the radar, imaged over 400 selected sites with approximately 14,000 photographs (a Shuttle record) and recorded enough data to fill 26,000 encyclopedias. Areas of investigation included ecology, oceanography, geology, and hydrology. Launching on April 9, 1994, from the Kennedy Space Center in Florida, the Endeavour and her crew of six completed 183 orbits of the Earth before landing at Edwards AFB, California, on April 20, 1994.

=== Post-NASA career ===
==== Business ====
Gutierrez retired from the Air Force and NASA in 1994 and joined Sandia National Laboratories, where he served in various senior leadership positions. As a Center Director he was responsible for programs introducing disruptive ideas and technologies into satellites, space payloads and sensors. He also had a hand in performing vulnerability assessments and directing the creation of analysis tools.

In 2012 he joined Rocket Crafters Inc., now Vaya Space, as a member of the board of directors. In February 2015 he retired from Sandia to become the chairman of the board and CEO of Rocket Crafters. He also serves, or has served, on the boards of other for-profit corporations and a number of not-for-profit organizations, a state technical university as well as NASA's Aerospace Safety Advisory Panel and a Presidential Commission.

== Personal life ==
He is married to the former Marianne Sue Cremer of Jefferson City, Missouri. They have three children. His recreational interests include camping, woodworking, and racquetball.

== Special honors ==
=== NASA ===
- NASA Outstanding Leadership Medal
- NASA Exceptional Achievement Medal
- Two NASA Space Flight Medals
- 1995 inductee into the International Space Hall of Fame,

=== Hispanic ===
- 1990 Congressional Hispanic Caucus Award
- Awarded Aviation Week & Space Technology Aerospace Laureate in Space and Missiles for 1991
- Hispanic Engineer magazine 1992 Hispanic Engineer of the Year National Achievement Award
- Aviation Week and Space Technology Citation for Aerospace Laureate in Space and Missiles for 1994
- 1994 selected by Hispanic Business magazine as one of the 100 Most Influential Hispanics
- selected by Hispanic Magazine for the 1995 Hispanic Achievement Award in Science

=== New Mexico ===
- 2010 NotableNew Mexican

=== Military ===
- Distinguished Graduate of the USAF Academy
- Awarded the Defense Superior Service Medal
- The Air Force Meritorious Service Medal
- Air Force Commendation Medal with 1 Oak Leaf Cluster
- National Defense Service Medal
- Air Training Command Master Instructor.

=== Miscellaneous ===
Sid has the honor of having a middle school named after him in Roswell, New Mexico.

He also received an honorary doctorate from Webster University in 2019.

== See also ==
- List of Hispanic astronauts
