= Linda M. Godwin =

American astronaut (born 1952)

Linda Godwin
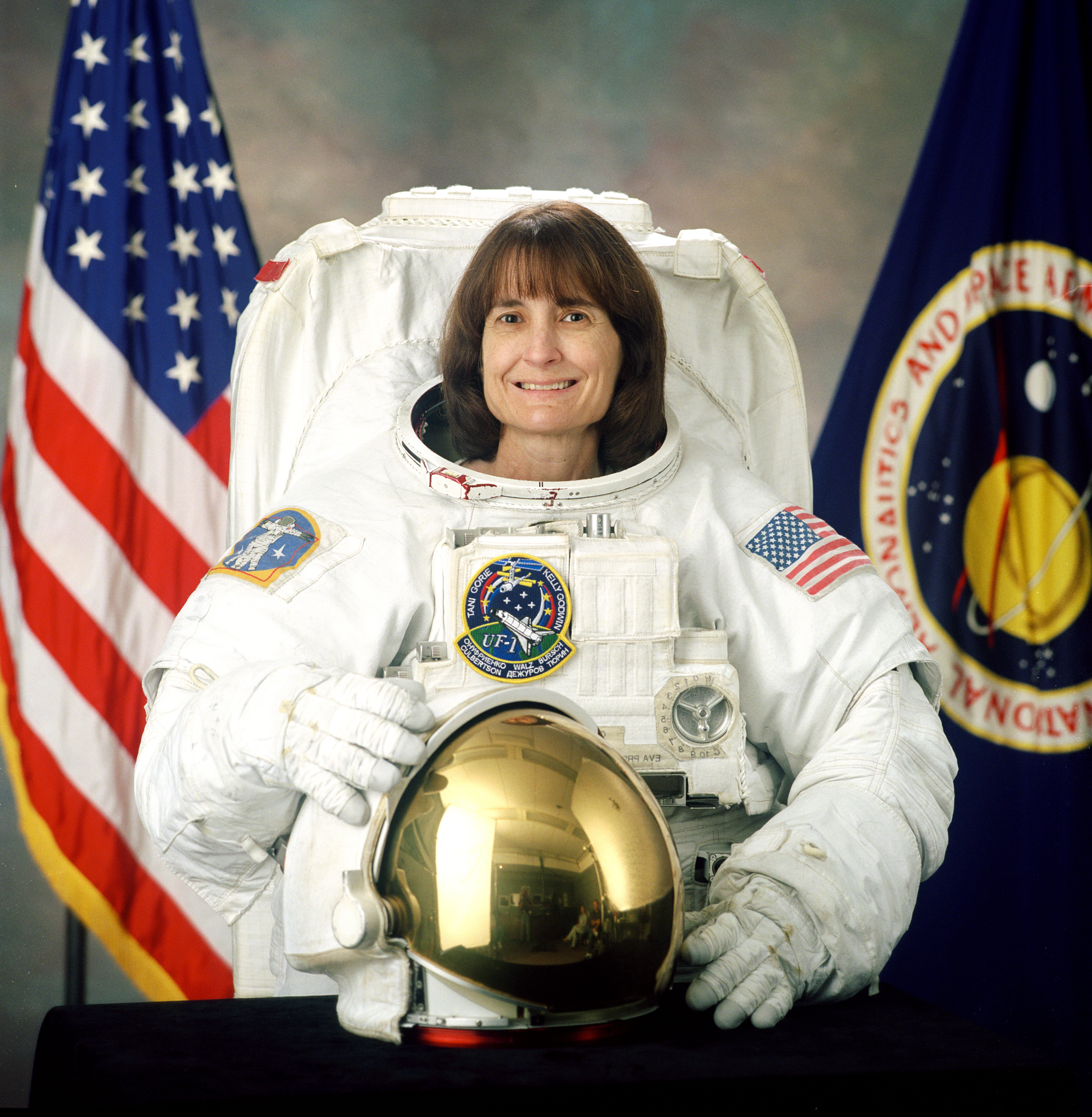
- Born: July 2, 1952 (age 74); Cape Girardeau, Missouri, U.S.
- Education: Southeast Missouri State University (BS); University of Missouri (MS, PhD)
- Spouse: Steven R. Nagel
- Space career

NASA astronaut
- Time in space: 38d 6h 13m
- Selection: NASA Group 11 (1985)
- Total EVAs: 2
- Total EVA time: 10h 14m
- Missions: STS-37; STS-59; STS-76; STS-108

Linda Maxine Godwin (born July 2, 1952) is an American scientist and retired NASA astronaut. Godwin joined NASA in 1980 and became an astronaut in July 1986. She retired in 2010. During her career, Godwin completed four space flights and logged over 38 days in space. Godwin also served as the assistant to the director for exploration, Flight Crew Operations Directorate at the Johnson Space Center. Since retiring from NASA, she accepted the position of professor in the Department of Physics and Astronomy at the University of Missouri. She was the first woman to perform spacewalks outside two different space stations, Mir in March 1996 and the International Space Station in December 2001.

== Early life ==
Godwin was born July 2, 1952, in Cape Girardeau, Missouri, but her hometown is Jackson, Missouri. She graduated from Jackson High School in Jackson, Missouri, in 1970, then received a Bachelor of Science degree in mathematics and physics from Southeast Missouri State University in 1974, and a Master of Science degree and a Doctorate in physics from the University of Missouri in 1976 and 1980.

== Personal life ==
Godwin is a member of the American Physical Society, the Ninety-Nines, Inc., Association of Space Explorers, Aircraft Owners and Pilots Association.

Godwin married fellow astronaut Steven Nagel (who had been her commander on her first spaceflight) and remained married until his death from cancer on August 21, 2014.

== Awards and honors ==
- NASA Outstanding Performance Rating
- Sustained Superior Performance Award
- NASA Outstanding Leadership Medal
- NASA Exceptional Service Medal
- NASA Distinguished Service Medal

== Academic experience ==
After completing undergraduate studies in physics and mathematics at Southeast Missouri State University, Godwin attended graduate school at the University of Missouri in Columbia, Missouri. During that time she taught undergraduate physics labs and was the recipient of several research assistantships. She conducted research in low temperature solid state physics, including studies in electron tunneling and vibrational modes of absorbed molecular species on metallic substrates (surfaces) at liquid helium temperatures. Results of her research have been published in several journals.

Godwin is an instrument rated private pilot.

== NASA career ==
Godwin joined NASA in 1980, in the Payload Operations Division, Mission Operations Directorate, where she worked in payload integration (attached payloads and Spacelabs), and as a flight controller and payloads officer on several Space Shuttle missions.

Selected by NASA as an astronaut candidate in June 1985, Godwin became an astronaut in July 1986. Her technical assignments have included working with flight software verification in the Shuttle Avionics Integration Laboratory (SAIL), and coordinating mission development activities for the Inertial Upper Stage (IUS), deployable payloads, and Spacelab missions. She also has served as chief of astronaut appearances, chief of the Mission Development Branch of the Astronaut Office and as the astronaut liaison to its Educational Working Group, deputy chief of the Astronaut Office, deputy director of the Flight Crew Operations Directorate, and assistant to the director for exploration, Flight Crew Operations Directorate at the Johnson Space Center.

A veteran of four space flights, Godwin has logged over 38 days in space, including over ten EVA hours in two spacewalks. In 1991 she served as a mission specialist on STS-37, was the payload commander on STS-59 in 1994, flew on STS-76 in 1996, a Mir docking mission, and served on STS-108/International Space Station Flight UF-1 in 2001. She retired from NASA in 2010.

== Spaceflight experience ==
=== STS-37 ===
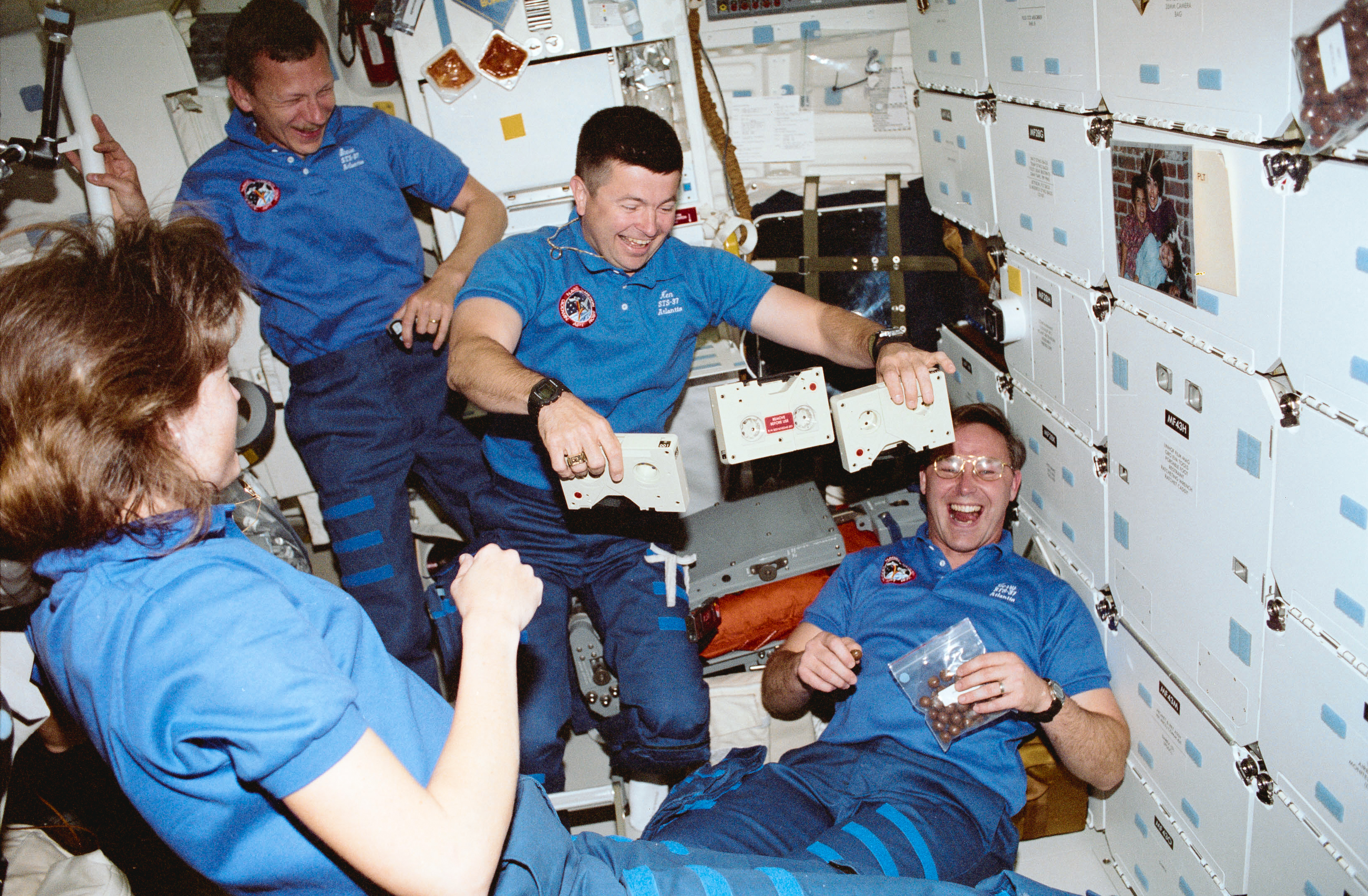
Godwin (left) and her crewmates during STS-37

Godwin served as mission specialist 1 on the crew of STS-37. Atlantis was launched from Kennedy Space Center Launch Complex 39B April 5, 1991, 14:22:45 UTC and returned to land at Edwards Air Force Base, California, April 11, 1991, 13:55:29 UTC. During the 93 orbits of the mission, the crew deployed the Compton Gamma Ray Observatory (GRO) to study gamma ray sources in the universe. GRO, at about 35,000 pounds (16,000 kg), was the heaviest payload deployed to date by the Shuttle Remote Manipulator System (RMS). The crew also conducted an unscheduled spacewalk to free the GRO high gain antenna, and conducted the first scheduled extravehicular activity in 5 1/2 years to test concepts for moving about large space structures. Several middeck experiments and activities were conducted including test of elements of a heat pipe to study fluid transfer processed in microgravity environments (SHARE), a chemical processing apparatus to characterize the structure of biological materials (BIMDA), and an experiment to grow larger and more perfect protein crystals than can be grown on the ground (PCG II). Atlantis carried amateur radio equipment for voice contact, fast scan and slow scan TV, and packet radio. Several hundred contacts were made with amateur radio operators around the world. Mission duration was 143 hours, 32 minutes, 44 seconds.

=== STS-59 ===
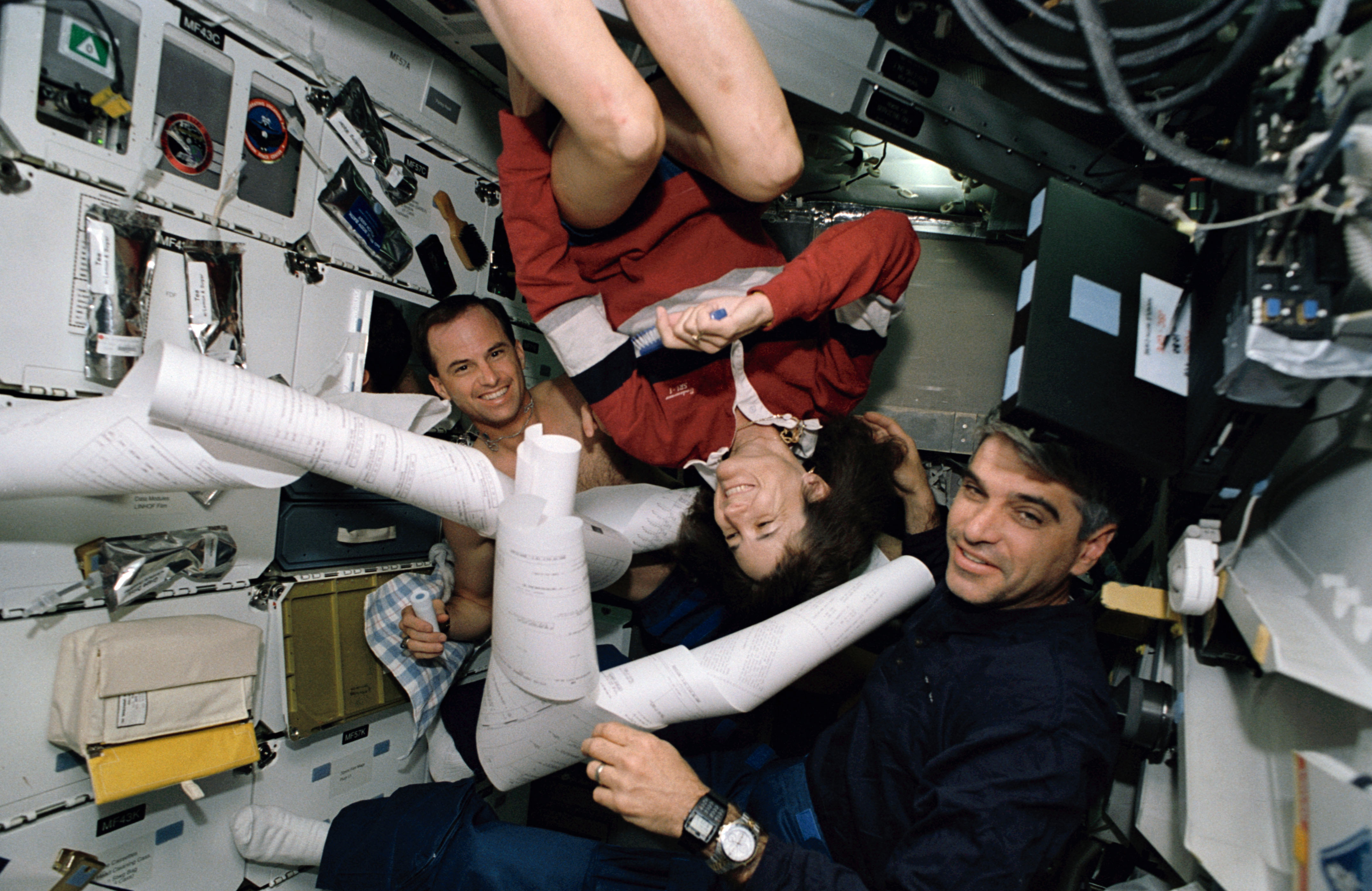
Godwin (center) and her crew mates on the middeck of Endeavour during STS-59

Godwin served as payload commander on the crew of STS-59. Endeavour launched from Kennedy Space Center Launch Complex 39A April 9, 1994, 11:05 UTC. STS-59 was the Space Radar Laboratory (SRL) mission. SRL consisted of three large radars, SIR-C/X-SAR (Shuttle Imaging Radar C/X-Band Synthetic Aperture Radar), and a carbon monoxide sensor that were used to enhance studies of the Earth's surface and atmosphere. The imaging radars operated in three frequencies and four polarizations. This multispectral capability of the radars provided information about the Earth's surface over a wide range of scales not discernible with previous single-frequency experiments. The carbon monoxide sensor MAPS (Measurement of Air Pollution by Satellite) used gas filter radiometry to measure the global distribution of CO in the troposphere. Real-time crew observations of surface phenomena and climatic conditions augmented with over 14,000 photographs aided investigators in interpretation and calibration of the data. The mission concluded with a landing at Edwards Air Force Base, California, April 20, 1994, 16:55 UTC after orbiting the Earth 183 times in 269 hours, 29 minutes.

=== STS-76 ===
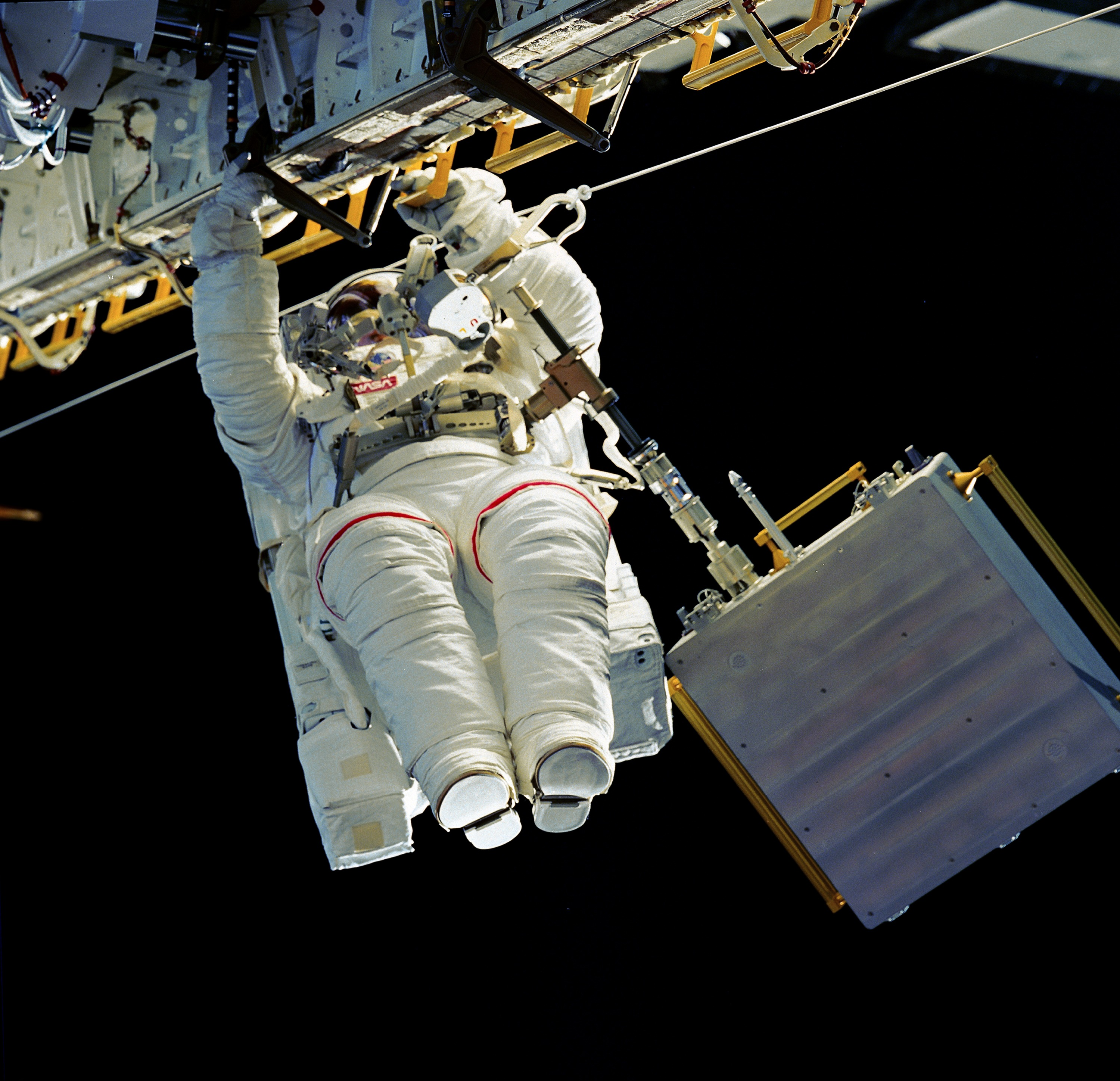
Linda Godwin performing a spacewalk on STS-76

Godwin served as mission specialist 3 on the crew of STS-76. Atlantis launched from Kennedy Space Center Launch Complex 39B from March 22, 1996, 08:13:04 UTC. STS-76 was the third docking mission to the Russian space station Mir. Following rendezvous and docking with Mir, transfer of a NASA astronaut to Mir for a 5-month stay was accomplished to begin a continuous presence of United States astronauts aboard Mir for the next two-year period. The crew also transferred 4,800 pounds (2,200 kg) of science and mission hardware, food, water and air to Mir and returned over 1,100 pounds (500 kg) of U.S. and ESA science and Russian hardware. Godwin performed a six-hour spacewalk, the first while docked to an orbiting space station, to mount experiment packages on the Mir docking module to detect and assess debris and contamination in a space station environment. The packages will be retrieved by a future shuttle mission. The Spacehab module carried in the Shuttle payload bay was utilized extensively for transfer and return stowage of logistics and science and also carried Biorack, a small multipurpose laboratory used during this mission for research of plant and animal cellular function. This mission was also the first flight of Kidsat, an electronic camera controlled by classroom students via a Ku-band link between JSC Mission Control and the Shuttle, which uses digital photography from the Shuttle for science and education. The STS-76 mission concluded with a successful landing at Edwards Air Force Base, California, March 31, 1996, 13:28:57 UTC after 145 orbits of the Earth, traveling 3,800,000 miles (6,100,000 km) in 221 hours and 15 minutes.

=== STS-108 ===
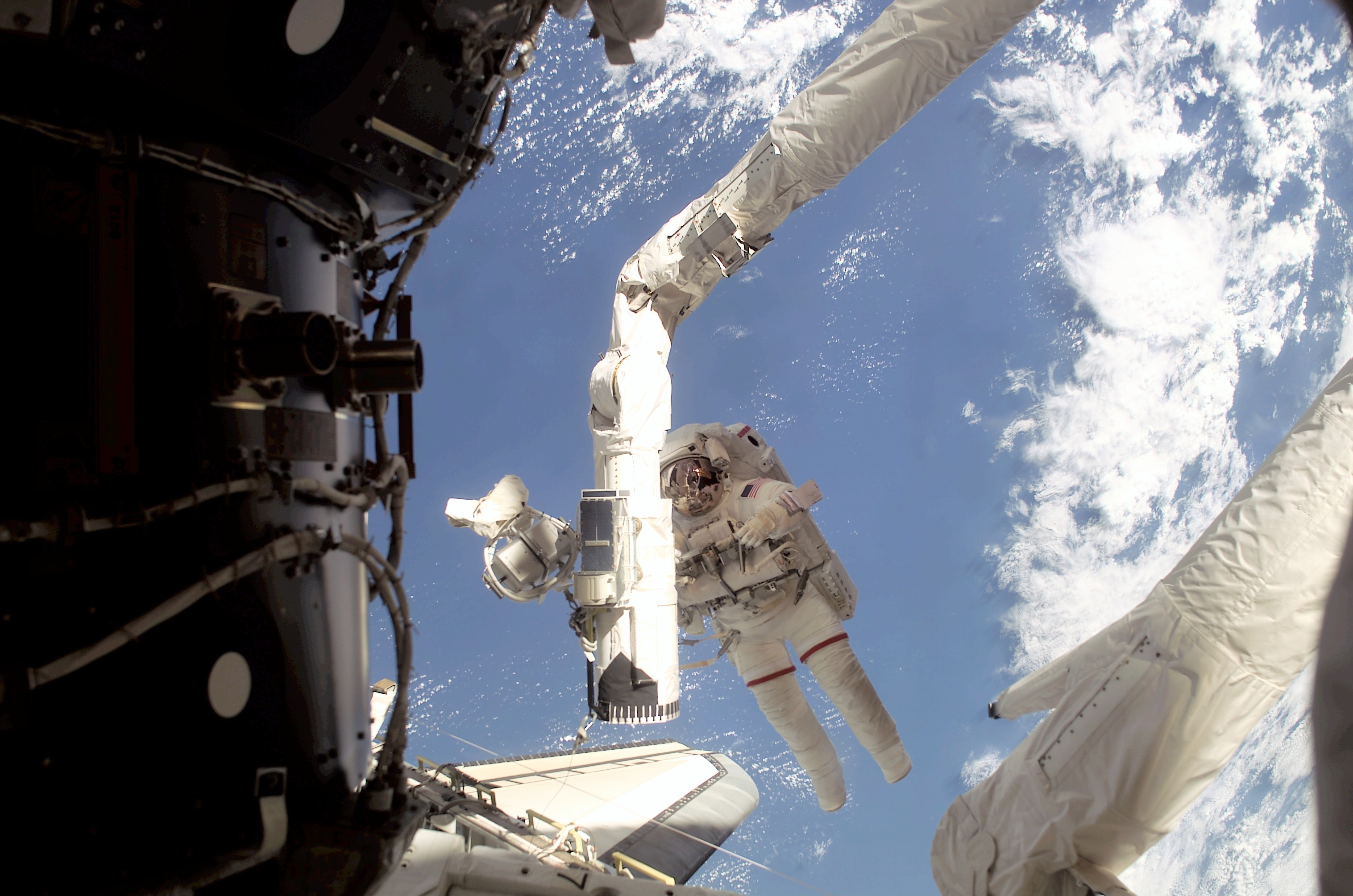
Godwin performs a spacewalk on STS-108

Godwin served as mission specialist 1 on the crew of STS-108. Endeavour launched from Kennedy Space Center Launch Complex 39B 5 December 2001 22:19:28 UTC. STS-108 was the 12th shuttle flight to visit the International Space Station. Endeavour's crew delivered the Expedition-4 crew and returned the Expedition-3 crew. The crew unloaded over 4,600 pounds (2,100 kg) of supplies, logistics and science experiments from the Raffaello Multi-Purpose Logistics Module and repacked over 3,000 pounds (1,400 kg) of items no longer needed on the station for return to Earth. Godwin used the Shuttle's robotic arm to install the MPLM onto the Station Node, and participated in a spacewalk to wrap thermal blankets around ISS Solar Array Beta Gimbal Assemblies. STS-108 concluded with a successful landing at the Shuttle Landing Facility 17 December 2001 17:56:13 UTC after 185 Earth orbits, traveling 4,800,000 miles (7,700,000 km) in 283 hours and 36 minutes.
