= STS-59 =

1994 American crewed spaceflight to conduct Earth observations

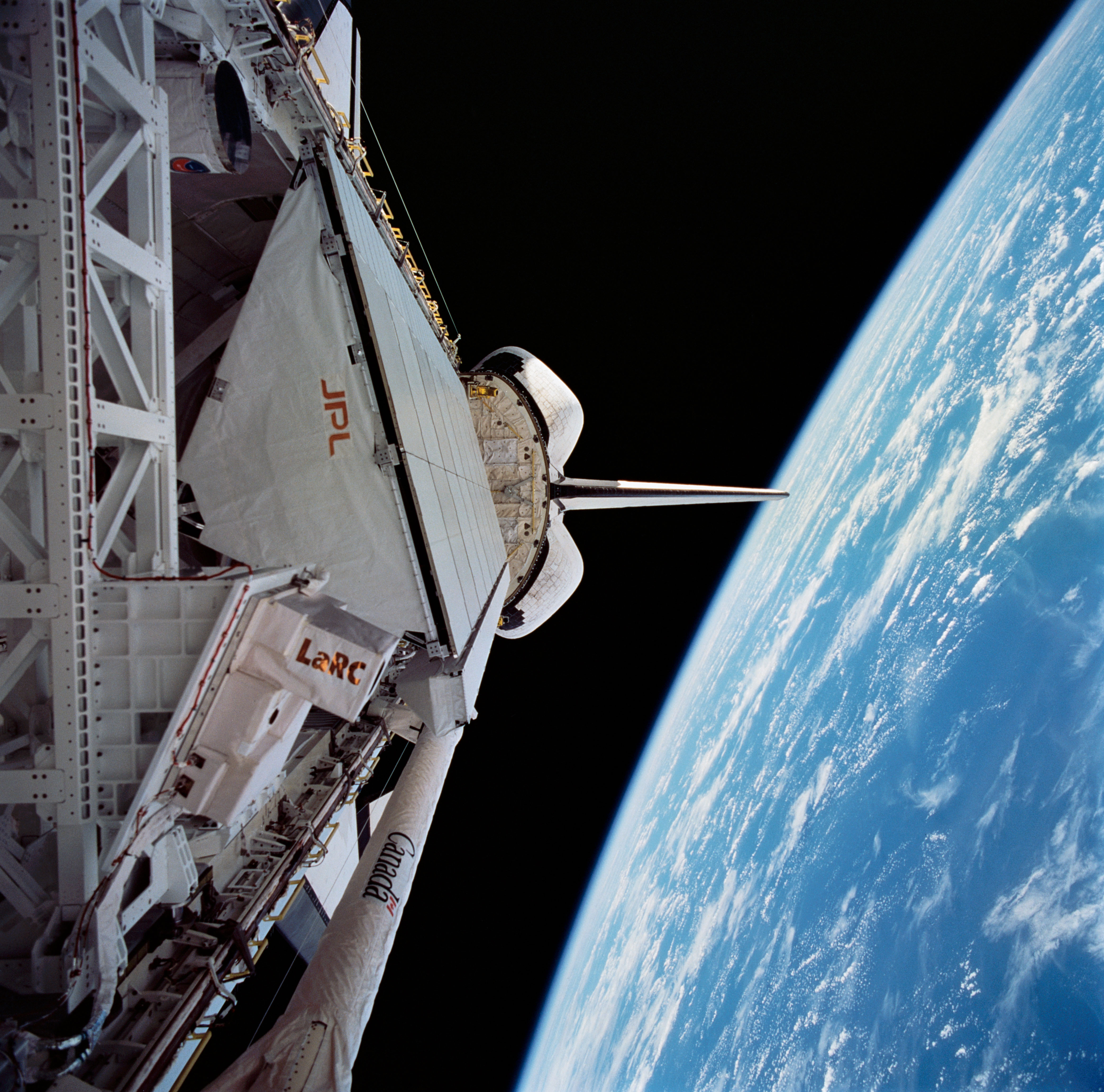
- Space Shuttle Endeavour in orbit with SIR-C in its payload bay
- Names: Space Transportation System-59
- Mission type: Radar imaging
- Operator: NASA
- COSPAR ID: 1994-020A
- SATCAT no.: 23042
- Mission duration: 11 days, 5 hours, 49 minutes, 30 seconds
- Distance travelled: 7,571,762 kilometers (4,704,875 mi)
- Orbits completed: 183

Spacecraft properties
- Spacecraft: Space Shuttle Endeavour
- Payload mass: 12,490 kilograms (27,540 lb)

Crew
- Crew size: 6
- Members: Sidney M. Gutierrez; Kevin P. Chilton; Linda M. Godwin; Jerome "Jay" Apt III; Michael R. Clifford; Thomas D. Jones

Start of mission
- Launch date: 9 April 1994, 11:05 UTC
- Launch site: Kennedy, LC-39A

End of mission
- Landing date: 20 April 1994, 16:55 UTC
- Landing site: Edwards Runway 22

Orbital parameters
- Reference system: Geocentric
- Regime: Low Earth
- Perigee altitude: 194 kilometres (121 mi)
- Apogee altitude: 204 kilometres (127 mi)
- Inclination: 57 degrees
- Period: 88.4 min
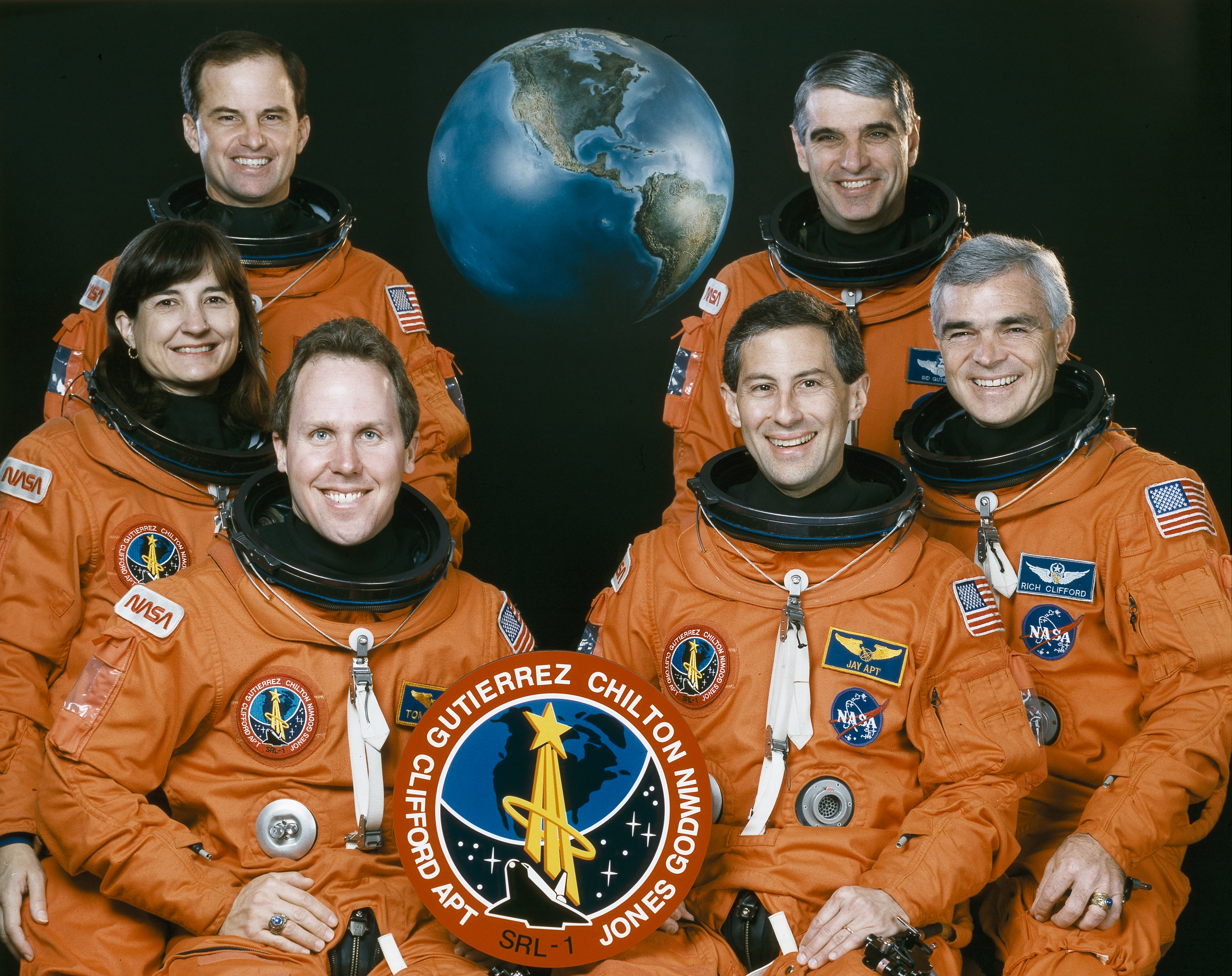
- Left to right - Standing: Chilton, Gutierrez; Seated: Godwin, Jones, Apt, Clifford Space Shuttle program

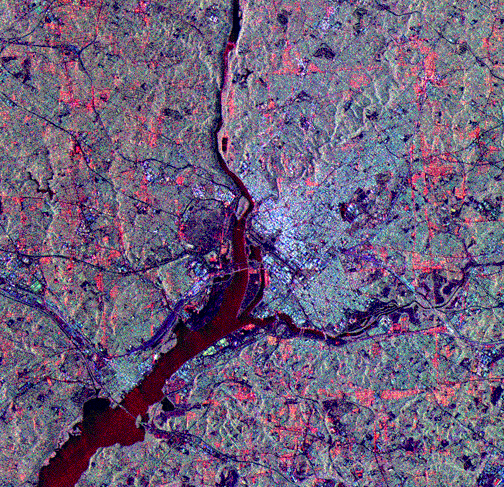
Washington, D.C. as seen by SIR–C/X–SAR imaging radar.

STS-59 was a Space Shuttle program mission that took place in 1994. The launch was chronicled by the 1994 Discovery Channel special about the Space Shuttle program.

== Crew ==
Position	Astronaut
Commander	Sidney M. Gutierrez; Second and last spaceflight
Pilot	Kevin P. Chilton; Second spaceflight
Mission Specialist 1	Jay Apt; Third spaceflight
Mission Specialist 2 Flight Engineer	Michael R. Clifford; Second spaceflight
Mission Specialist 3	Linda M. Godwin; Second spaceflight
Mission Specialist 4	Thomas D. Jones; First spaceflight
Member of Blue Team; Member of Red Team

=== Crew seat assignments ===
Seat	Launch	Landing	Seats 1–4 are on the flight deck. Seats 5–7 are on the mid-deck.
1	Gutierrez		Seats 1–4 are on the flight deck. Seats 5–7 are on the mid-deck.
2	Chilton		Seats 1–4 are on the flight deck. Seats 5–7 are on the mid-deck.
3	Apt	Jones	Seats 1–4 are on the flight deck. Seats 5–7 are on the mid-deck.
4	Clifford		Seats 1–4 are on the flight deck. Seats 5–7 are on the mid-deck.
5	Godwin		Seats 1–4 are on the flight deck. Seats 5–7 are on the mid-deck.
6	Jones	Apt	Seats 1–4 are on the flight deck. Seats 5–7 are on the mid-deck.
7	Unused		Seats 1–4 are on the flight deck. Seats 5–7 are on the mid-deck.

== Mission highlights ==
Attempt	Planned	Result	Turnaround	Reason	Decision point	Weather go (%)	Notes
1	7 Apr 1994, 8:07:00 am	Scrubbed	—	Technical	4 Apr 1994, 12:00 am (T−27:00:00)		Additional time needed to inspect high pressure oxidizer preburner pumps in the main engines.
2	8 Apr 1994, 8:06:00 am	Scrubbed	0 days 23 hours 59 minutes	Weather	8 Apr 1994, 10:36 am (T−00:05:00)	40	Low clouds at launch site and shuttle landing facility. High crosswinds were also present at the SLF.
3	9 Apr 1994, 7:05:00 am	Success	0 days 22 hours 59 minutes				

=== 9 April ===
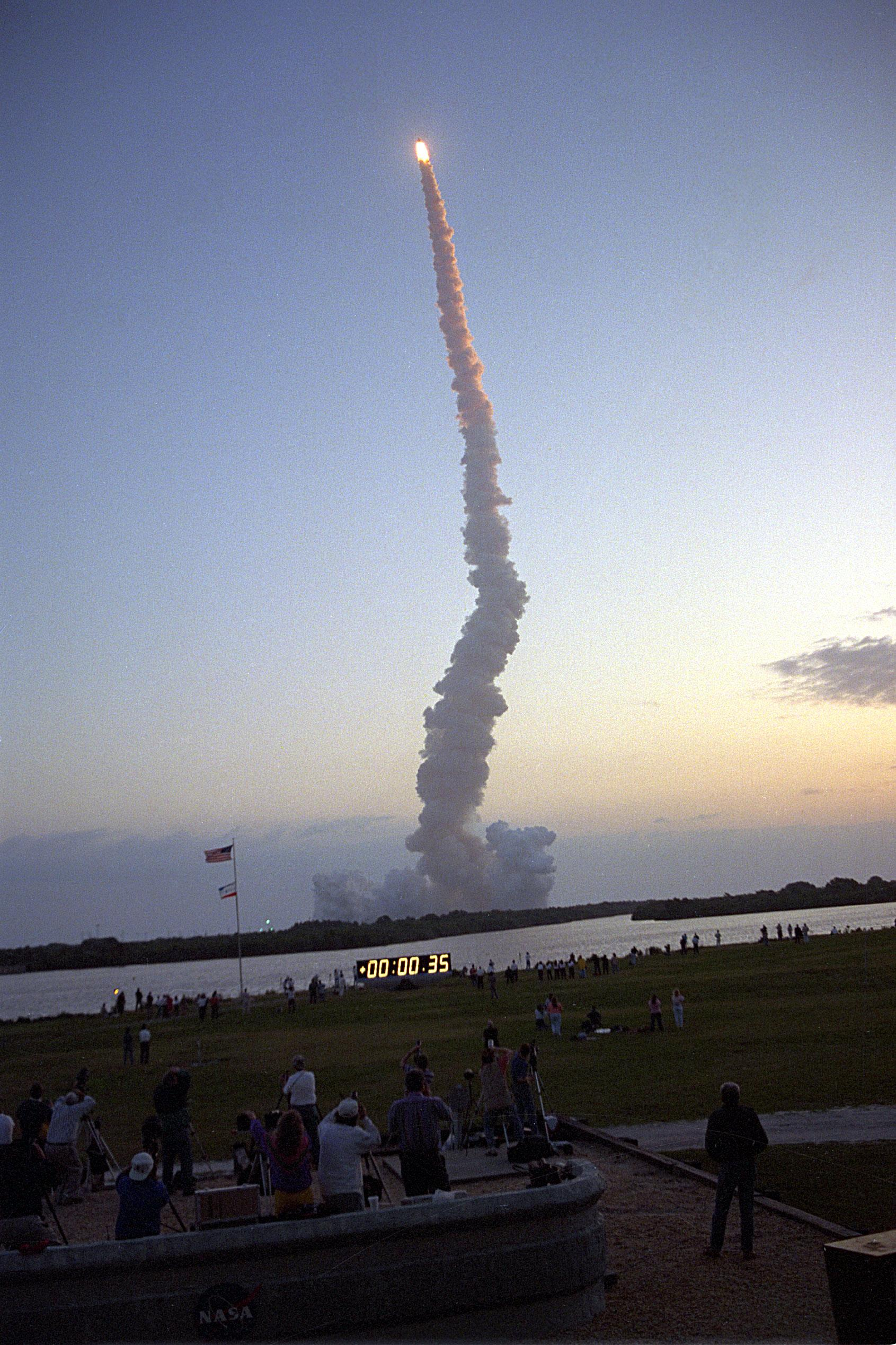
STS-59 launches from Kennedy Space Center, 9 April 1994.

Endeavour began its sixth mission on the morning of 9 April 1994, with an on-time launch at 7:05 am Eastern time. Soon after, the six astronauts began activating the sensitive radar equipment in the payload bay that would be operated around the clock during the next ten days.

By 8 pm, the Space Radar Laboratory-1 experiments of NASA's Mission to Planet Earth were all activated and began their study of the earth's ecosystem.

STS-59 ground controllers finished activating the Spaceborne Imaging Radar-C (SIR-C) and began processing its first images of the Earth, while engineers working with the X-Band Synthetic Aperture Radar (X-SAR) worked their way through some initial activation problems.

Meanwhile, the Measurement of Air Pollution from Satellite (MAPS) instrument took data on the carbon monoxide content and distribution in the atmosphere since shortly after launch.

During the initial activation of the X-SAR, controllers reported they were unable to fully power up the amplifier that provides power to the radar. The problem was in the low voltage circuit internal to the power amplifier. Engineers were not immediately able to explain the problem, so they turned off the power amplifier for about three hours. The problem was traced to an oversensitive protection circuit, a type of circuit breaker. The radar lab engineers bypassed the protection circuit and turned on the instrument at about 4:20 pm Saturday. It worked without incident, completing 100 percent of its scheduled observations overnight.

Thereafter, X-SAR controllers continued a deliberate, step-by-step check of the instrument, and successfully bounced X-band radar pulses off the Earth and recorded data. All of the instrument's circuits recorded normal readings. The crew also activated Space Tissue Loss investigations on the middeck, and the Getaway Special experiments in the cargo bay.

=== 10 April ===
As of Sunday morning, 10 April 1994, the radar laboratory had taken data readings on more than 40 targets including Howland, Maine; Macquarie Island; the Black Sea; Matera, Italy; and the Strait of Gibraltar. Scientists also gathered information on three of 19 "supersites," the highest priority targets for that day. Sunday's supersite observations were global carbon and hydrologic cycles in Duke Forest, North Carolina; hydrologic cycles around Ötztal, Austria; and geological data on Lake Chad in the Sahara. Observation sites for Sunday afternoon included Gippsland, Australia; Sable Island; Toronto, Ontario, Canada; Bermuda; Bighorn Basin, Wyoming; Chung Li, China; and Mammoth Mountain, California. The supersite opportunities were Raco, Michigan and the Gulf Stream.

Sunday evening's supersite observations by SIR-C and X-SAR focused on the interaction of plants and animals in the ecology of the forests of Raco, Michigan; hydrologic cycles around Bebedouro, Brazil; tectonic plate activity around the Galapagos Islands in the South Pacific; and the transfer of heat through wave energy in the Southern Ocean.

The Measurement of Atmospheric Pollution from Satellite instrument also continued to take readings of the concentration and distribution of carbon monoxide throughout the troposphere. Crew members reported good earth observation photography opportunities over the Northeast Pacific Ocean and the frozen lakes of the Raco supersite area, as well as fires in the Sierra Madre mountains of Mexico.

On flight day two, the Red Team crew of Commander Gutierrez, Pilot Chilton and Linda M. Godwin began its sleep shift about 5 pm Central time, to awaken at 2 am The Blue Team crew members, Jay Apt, Michael R. Clifford and Thomas D. Jones, awakened about 4 pm to begin their third flight day on orbit, and would go to bed about 5 am

=== 11 April ===
As of Monday, 11 April 1994, 6:30 am Central time, three real-time radar images were downlinked from Endeavour overnight. A view of the Sahara Desert in Algeria, one of the geology sites, was taken to help scientists map surface and subsurface structures, including drainage patterns.

Also, the two radar imaging systems were calibrated over Matera, Italy, and Oberpfaffenhofen, Germany, near Munich, in collaboration with students from LMU Munich. The students measured soil moisture, forestry parameters, and the biomass of agricultural crops in the area at the same time the radar data was gathered.

Thomas D. Jones gave scientists real-time observations of thunderstorms over Taiwan, the Philippines and New Guinea to augment data being gathered by the (MAPS) experiment. Jay Apt described a "good-sized" dust storm on the northwest coast of Australia.

The MAPS project's Vickie Connors reported to Endeavour's Red Team that there was good correlation between what the instruments on board were reading compared to data gathered on the ground.

Concluding Flight Day 3, the Blue Team started their sleep period beginning about 8 am The Red Team went to work a few minutes after five that morning.

By Monday, 11 April 1994, 6 p.m. CDT, several more real-time images were processed by X-SAR – Sahara Desert, a geology site and the area around the Japanese archipelago. Endeavour flew over the southern portion of Japan, and the quick-look processor showed oil slicks.

Monday's radar work included calibration passes over Palm Valley, Northern Territory in Australia, and the Amazon forests of Brazil; oceanography observations over the Northeast Pacific Ocean, the Gulf Stream, the Southern Ocean and the Gulf of Mexico; ecology observations over Altona, Manitoba, Canada; geology observations over the Bighorn Basin, Wyoming; hydrology studies of Mammoth Mountain, California, and geology studies of the tectonic activity around the Galapagos Islands of the southeastern Pacific.

Linda M. Godwin reported good photography of "tremendous" thunderstorms over South America and ocean wind patterns around the Galapagos. She also reported three Shuttle Amateur Radio Experiment contacts with students at Ealy Elementary School in West Bloomfield, Michigan, Country Club School in San Ramon, California, and Boy Scouts in Richardson, Texas.

The crew reported air bubbles in the water supply for Endeavour's galley.

=== 12 April ===
On Tuesday, 12 April 1994, 3 a.m. Eastern time a real-time image was downlinked from the X-SAR showing a region of the Andes Mountains in Bolivia.

During the Blue Team's shift, the X-SAR and SIR-C collected images of oceanography sites including the South Pacific Ocean, the East Australian Ocean currents, and the North Atlantic Ocean; geology sites at Cerro Laukaru, Chile, snow cover at Otztal, in the Austrian Alps, and Ha Meshar, Israel; and ecology sites at Howland, Maine, and Duke Forest, North Carolina.

The Red Team began their work about 7 am EDT on Tuesday 12 April 1994. Gutierrez and Chilton slept in an extra hour because they were about an hour and a half late going to sleep the night before after working on an in-flight maintenance procedure to eliminate air bubbles that were collecting in the drinking and food preparation water. The astronauts connected the water dispensing hose directly to the supply tank, bypassing the galley water outlet. A later test during the Blue Team's shift indicated that bubbles still may get into the drink bags through the opening where water goes into the drink container.

During this shift, live X-SAR moving images were downlinked of the area surrounding Sarobetsu, Japan, one of the high-priority calibration sites for the X-band antenna. Scientists on the ground measured the strength of the radar signal and the size of the swath being imaged.

Ground investigators also were developing topographic maps of Japan and searching for the optimum way in which to use the three radar antennas for mapping rice fields.

X-SAR's quick-look processor also showed images of the Bay of Campeche in the Gulf of Mexico as well as the land around Veracruz, Mexico. Ground investigators were taking simultaneous measurements of the ecological test site, looking for soil and vegetation information during the dry season of the tropical forest there.

Godwin reported that the crew had a cloud-free opportunity to photography Chickasha, Oklahoma, one of the 19 "supersites," and that they had seen sea ice along the coast of the Kamchatka Peninsula of Russia.

=== 13 April ===
On Wednesday, 13 April 1994, 7 a.m. Eastern time, the Blue Team completed its fifth working day in space with a handover to the Red Team.

During the Blue shift, researchers watched televised downlinks of live X-SAR moving images of surface and subsurface structures in the Namib Desert in South Africa to improve researchers' understanding of radar backscatter. Scientists also viewed radar images of sea ice and seasonal melt in the Sea of Okhotsk off the coast of Siberia and a critical region of expanding drought in the Sahel area of the Sudan.

At about 2:45 am Central time while Endeavour passed over Australia, Jay Apt exchanged greetings with the Russian cosmonauts aboard the Mir space station aboard Endeavour as the two spacecraft passed within 1,200 nautical miles (2,200 kilometres (1,400 mi)) of each other above Australia. Both crews used amateur radio equipment for the contact which was monitored real-time by many amateur radio stations via telebridge systems and rebroadcasts.

All three Blue Team astronauts exercised on the bicycle ergometer during their work shift for an ongoing biomedical study of exercise as a possible countermeasure for the deconditioning which astronauts experience in their cardiovascular systems during space missions.

Rich Clifford had off-duty time for the second half of his work day. Also, an in-flight maintenance procedure to install a makeshift seal for drink bags and food containers at the galley water dispenser helped reduce bubbles in the drinking and food preparation water.

At 10:30 am, Red Team crew members were on duty for their fifth shift of the mission. The crew reported good photography opportunities over Manitoba, Canada, saying the lakes appeared more "bluish" than anticipated.

Gutierrez was interviewed by CNBC's Tom Snyder and Clifford will answer questions from Mutual Radio Network listeners during an interview for the Jim Bohannon Show at 11:15 pm central.

=== 14 April ===
On Thursday, 14 April 1994, 3:30 am Central Time, Rich Clifford answered listeners' questions about space flight, mission objectives, and the quality of life aboard the Space Shuttle Endeavour during a 20-minute interview on Mutual Radio Wednesday night.

The Blue Team reported good photography of a gigantic fire-scarred area in China that burned in 1987. This region was of special interest to the Measurement of Atmospheric Pollution experiment for studies of forest regrowth after a fire event.

Jay Apt had off-duty time for the first half of the Blue Team's sixth work day in space. During his off-duty time, Apt exercised on the bicycle ergometer and recorded his heart rate and perceived exertion for biomedical investigators. Apt was back on duty at 1 am central time.

The X-SAR science team's quick-look data processor produced moving video images of the Chickasha site, starting just north of the Oklahoma border in Kansas and ending just south of the Oklahoma River in Texas. Hydrologists studied the data to learn how well the radar is able to determine the soil moisture content as it fluctuates from day to day and week to week.

=== 15 April ===
On Friday, 15 April 1994. Tom Jones commented that the pollution cloud noted over Manila Bay in the Philippines on flight day six was almost invisible today. At about 1:50 am central time, Jones reported that the astronauts had seen fires along the west coast of Burma and smoke over Tasmania.

One of the instruments aboard, MAPS, exhausted its supply of infrared film.

At 6 pm CDT, Chilton explained to the public how a vast network of ground scientists and students camped in the field at many of the worldwide sites assist with the radar observations, and Godwin answered questions supplied by CNN viewers around the world.

The crew was continuing to work on a nuisance with it galley, the presence of bubbles in the water used for drinking and rehydrating food.

=== 16 April ===
On Saturday, 16 April 1994, at about 11:30 pm and again at 1:15 am central time, Jay Apt used Endeavour's Shuttle Amateur Radio to talk with fellow astronauts Norm Thagard and Bonnie Dunbar and two Russian cosmonauts at the Star City training center outside Moscow.

The Blue Team—Jay Apt, Rich Clifford and Tom Jones—reported several visual observations including fires burning in Africa and a line of thunderstorms over northeastern Brazil. Payloads scientists asked the crew to add the Rügen Island, off Germany's northern coastline in the Baltic Sea, to their list of Earth observations photography.

On Saturday, 16 April 1994, 12:30 p.m.CDT, the Space Radar Lab-1 instruments also were continuing to operate well, and all observations were being made on schedule.

The sites being observed this day include areas of Japan and Italy. All of the observation sites have been recorded at least once at this point in the flight, and remaining observations are to supplement the data already obtained.

The annoyance that was present since the first day of the flight has been laid to rest with the successful in-flight maintenance procedure to get rid of air bubbles in the crew's water supply.

Godwin spent 15 minutes being interviewed by television reporters in Atlanta and Nashville.

=== 17 April ===
On Sunday, 17, 3 April a.m. Central time, the Blue Team was recording radar images for scientists studying how elements of Earth's land surfaces, water resources, and plant and animal life work together to create Earth's life-sustaining environment.

On Sunday, 17, 12 April:30 pm Central time, Endeavour's flight control surfaces and thruster jets were checked out to ensure they were in good working order for planned landing at the Kennedy Space Center.

On this day, two weeks after Easter Sunday (in the Gregorian Calendar) three of the astronauts - Gutierrez, Chilton and Jones - took part in a Roman Catholic service of Holy Communion. They paused for a moment of reflection and then received consecrated communion wafers brought aboard in a golden pyx.

The mission's six astronauts held their traditional in-flight news conference answering questions about the significance of the mission. Following the news conference, Commander Sid Gutierrez, Pilot Kevin Chilton and Flight Engineer Rich Clifford checked the orbiter systems while the payload crew of Mission Specialists Linda Godwin, Jay Apt and Tom Jones documented activity with the payload.

=== 18 April ===
On Monday, 18 April 1994, 2 p.m. Central time, Endeavour's crew were starting to pack up while final radar observations of earth were made and STS-59 wound down, aiming toward a 10:52 am central landing Tuesday.

The weather forecast was favorable for a landing in Florida, although flight controllers were watching a possibility of low clouds and a slight chance of showers in the area.

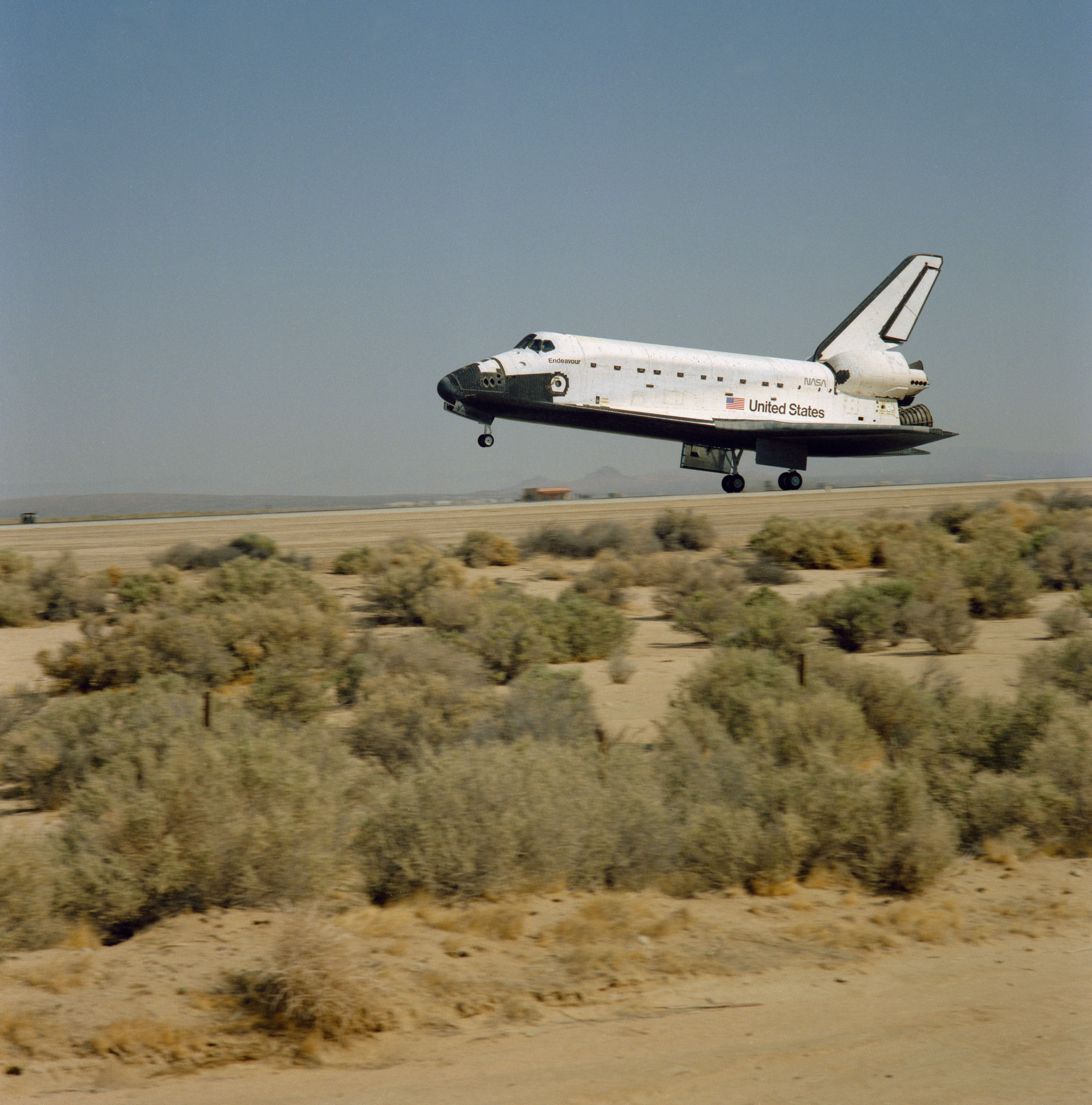
STS-59 lands at Edwards AFB in California.

=== 19 April ===
On Tuesday, 19 April 1994, 11:30 am Clouds and high winds in the vicinity of the Kennedy Space Center require Endeavour and its six astronauts to remain in space an additional day.

Following the wave off, the crew reconfigured the orbiter systems for the added day on orbit and reactivated a portion of the Space Radar Laboratory payload in the cargo bay. The Space Imaging Radar system (SIR-C) was the only part of the payload to be reactivated.

The data recorded during the STS-59 mission would fill the equivalent of 20,000 encyclopedia volumes. Payload managers reported that more than 70 million square kilometers of the Earth's surface, including land and sea, have been mapped on this flight. This figure represents about 12 percent of Earth's total surface. The Space Radar Laboratory obtained radar images of approximately 25 percent of the planet's land surfaces.

=== 20 April ===
On Wednesday, 20 April 1994, Endeavour landed at Edwards Air Force Base in California, completing its successful 11-day mission at 9:54 am.

== Mission insignia ==
The five stars on the left and nine stars on the right of the insignia symbolize the flight's numerical designation in the Space Transportation System's mission sequence.

== See also ==
- List of human spaceflights
- List of Space Shuttle missions
- Mission: Earth, Voyage to the Home Planet, 1996 book chronicling the mission
- Outline of space science
- Space Shuttle
