= JoBea Way Holt =

American planetary scientist

- Born: JoBea Way; 1954 (age 71–72); Lorain, Ohio, U.S.
- Other names: JoBea Holt, JoBea Way Holt
- Education: University of California, Berkeley B.S.; California Institute of Technology M.S., PhD
- Occupations: Planetary scientist; author
- Known for: Sally Ride EarthKAM

JoBea Way Holt (born 1954) is an American planetary scientist who has worked for NASA. Holt studied the carbon cycle in Earth's atmosphere. She is also a member of the Climate Project, and is the author of several books and research papers.

== Biography ==
Holt was born in Lorain, Ohio. Holt states that she was inspired to get into science by watching the 1969 Apollo 11 Moon landing. She attended University of California, Berkeley for her undergrad degree in chemistry and did her master's and Ph.D. at the California Institute of Technology (Caltech) in planetary sciences. At Caltech, she worked with Tom Jukes studying decontamination procedures used with the Viking spacecraft.

Holt began working at the Jet Propulsion Laboratory in 1976. When the second space shuttle flight carrying the first shuttle-borne imaging radar (SIR) went up, Holt became interested in how to study the Earth from space. Her discoveries about carbon flux in the atmosphere around boreal forests contributed to a greater understanding of the carbon cycle.

She was an elected member of the IEEE Geoscience and Remote Sensing Society (GRSS) Administrative Committee (AdCom) from 1990 through 1995, and was one of the first women involved in that capacity.

Holt is one of the creators of KidSat (later named Sally Ride EarthKAM) in 1995. She first became involved in the project in 1993.

Holt has been published in IEEE Transactions on Geoscience and Remote Sensing, Ecology, BioScience, the International Journal of Remote Sensing, the Journal of Geophysical Research, and the Canadian Journal of Remote Sensing. She also does research for NASA.

== Selected bibliography ==
- Baby's Day Out in Southern California: Fun Places to Go With Babies and Toddlers. Baldwin Park, CA: Gem Guides Book Co. 2003. ISBN 9781889786261.
- Using Google Earth: Bring the World Into Your Classroom. Level 6-8. Huntington Beach, CA: Shell Education. 2012. ISBN 9781425808266.
