= GRAIL MoonKAM =

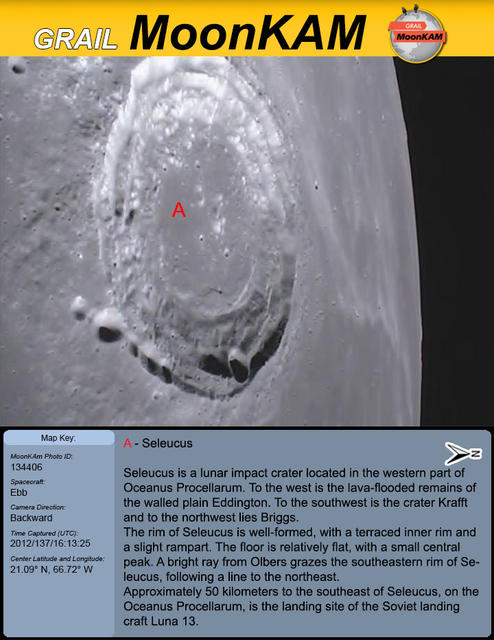
Photo annotation featuring lunar impact crater Seleucus

GRAIL MoonKAM (Moon Knowledge Acquired by Middle school students) was part of NASA’s GRAIL satellite mission to map the Moon’s gravity.

The twin GRAIL (Gravity Recovery and Interior Laboratory) satellites orbited the Moon from December 2011 to December 2012. The data they sent back deepened our understanding of the Moon’s gravity and interior composition.

GRAIL was NASA’s first planetary mission with instruments fully dedicated to education and public outreach. The MoonKAM program was also created to teach schoolchildren. Cameras aboard the GRAIL satellites took thousands of photographs during the mission.

== History ==
In March 2012, the GRAIL MoonKam was created. It lasted until December 2012. The Sally K. Ride Impact Site was created by the GRAIL MoonKam.
