= Spaceborne Imaging Radar =

NASA radar

Spaceborne Imaging Radar (SIR)
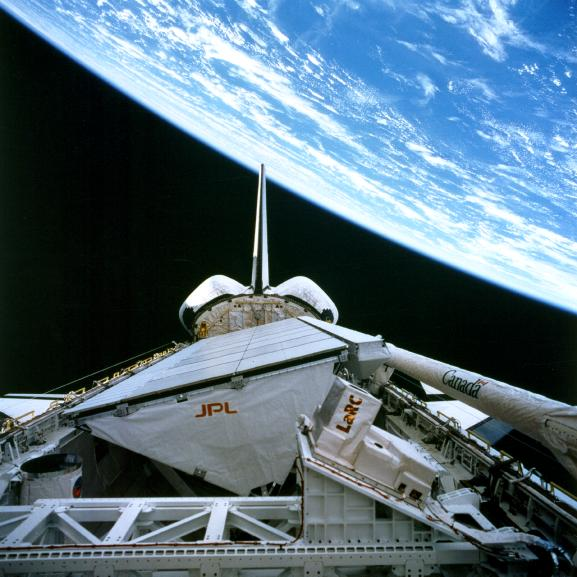
- SIR-C/X-SAR in the payload bay of space shuttle Endeavour on STS-59, 9 April 1994
- Mission type: Earth science
- Operator: NASA · JPL
- Website: jpl.nasa.gov/missions/spaceborne-imaging-radar-c-x-band-synthetic-aperture-radar-sir-c-x-sar/
- Mission duration: Two trips, 11 days each

Spacecraft properties
- Manufacturer: JPL

Start of mission
- Launch date: 9 April 1994 and 30 September 1994
- Rocket: STS-59 and STS-68
- Launch site: Cape Canaveral

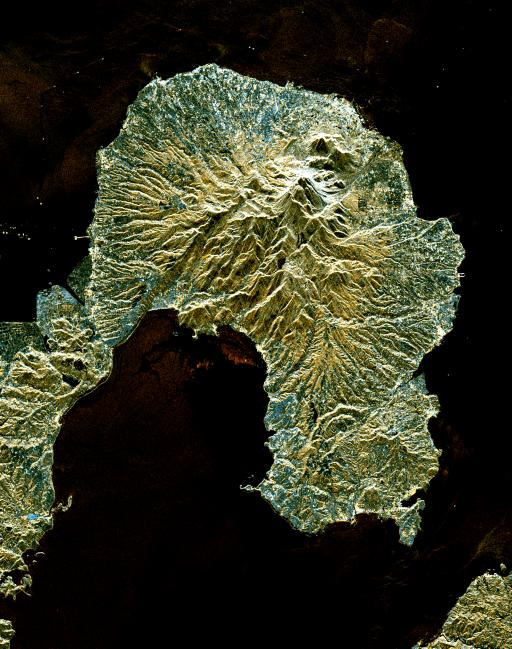
Spaceborne radar image of Mount Unzen Taken from Space Shuttle, 15 April 1994

The Spaceborne Imaging Radar (SIR) – full name 'Spaceborne Imaging Radar-C/X-band Synthetic Aperture Radar (SIR-C/X-SAR)', is a synthetic aperture radar which flew on two separate shuttle missions. Once from the Space Shuttle Endeavour in April 1994 on (STS-59) and again in October 1994 on (STS-68). The radar was run by NASA's Space Radar Laboratory. SIR utilizes 3 radar frequencies: L band (24 cm wavelength), C band (6 cm) and X band (3 cm), allowing for study of geology, hydrology, ecology and oceanography. Comparing radar images to data collected by teams of people on the ground as well as aircraft and ships using simultaneous measurements of vegetation, soil moisture, sea state, snow and weather conditions during each flight. The imaging radar was able to take images anytime regardless of clouds cover. The Radar-C system was built and operated by NASA's Jet Propulsion Laboratory (JPL). The mission was a joint work of NASA with the German and Italian space agencies. Each of the week long mission scanned about 50 million square kilometers of the Earth's surface, (19.3 million square miles).

The SIR mission revealed hidden river channels in the Sahara Desert indicating significant climate change in the past. SIR was also used for volcano research by keeping researchers a safe distance from hazardous and often inaccessible areas. The radar was also used to generate detailed three dimensional mappings of the Earth's surface.

Radar also found temples in Angkor, and ancient segments of China's Great Wall.

== Specification ==
- Orbital altitude above earth = 225 km (140 mi)
- The width of the imaged swath on the ground = 15–90 kilometers (9.3–55.9 miles)
- C-band beamwidth = 0.25 deg. × 5 deg.
- L-band beamwidth = 1.1 deg. × 6 deg.
- Scan angle range = ±23 deg. from boresight across narrow antenna direction only
- Bandwidth = 10, 20 and 40 MHz
- Pulse repetition rate = 1395–1736 pulses per second
- Total science data = 50 hours per channel, per mission (two missions, total 100 hours)
- Total instrument mass = 11,000 kg (24,000 lb)
- DC power consumption = 3000–9000 Watts
- L-band data rate = 90 Mbit/s
- C-band data rate = 90 Mbit/s
- X-band data rate = 45 Mbit/s
- L-band wavelength = 0.235 m
- C-band Wavelength = 0.058 m
- X-band wavelength = 0.031 m

== See also ==
- Seasat – Seasat Synthetic Aperture Radar (SAR) in 1978
- STS-2 with SIR-A
- STS-41-G with SIR-B
- Shuttle Radar Topography Mission
- TerraSAR-X
- Earth Radiation Budget Satellite
- TopSat
