= Mir Environmental Effects Payload =

NASA materials science experiments aboard the Russian space station

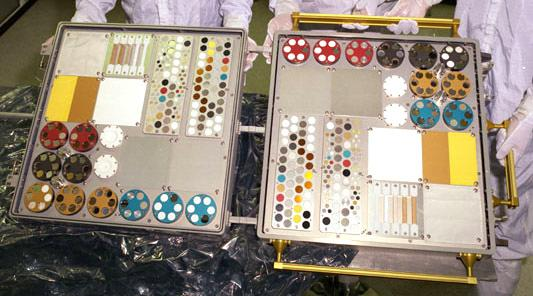
POSA-I prior to launch on STS-76.

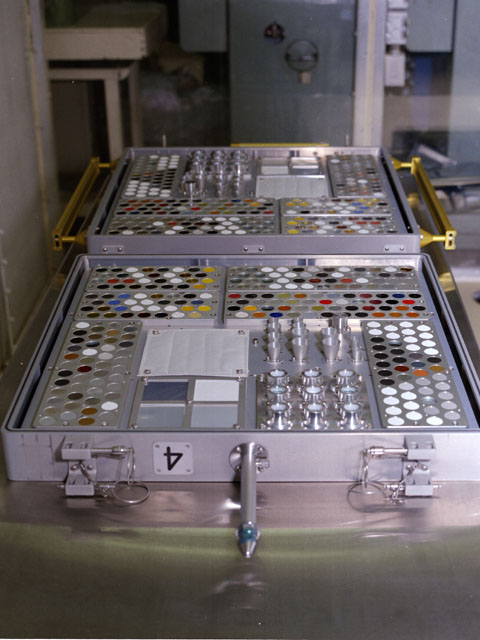
POSA-2 prior to launch on STS-76

The Mir Environmental Effects Payload (MEEP) was a set of four experiments installed on the Russian space station Mir from March 1996 to October 1997 to study the effects of space debris impacts and exposure to the space environment on a variety of materials. The materials used in the experiments were being considered for use on the International Space Station, and by exposing them at a similar orbital altitude to that flown by the ISS, the experiments provided an assessment of the performance of those materials in a similar space environment. MEEP also fulfilled the need to examine the occurrence and effects of man-made debris and natural micrometeoroids through capture and impact studies. The experiments were installed on the Mir docking module during STS-76, and retrieved during STS-86.

== Components ==
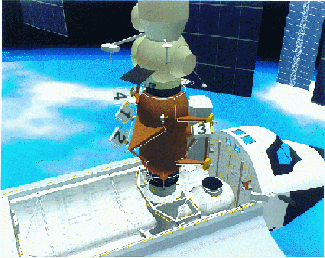
The four experiments as installed on Mir's docking module; PPMD (1), ODC (2), POSA I (4) and POSA II (3).

MEEP consisted of four separate experiments mounted in four separate Passive Experiment Carriers (PEC) installed on Mir's docking module. Each PEC consisted of three components; the experiment carrier, which contained the experiment itself, the sidewall carrier, which kept the PEC secure in the payload bay of the space shuttle during launch and return, and the handrail clamp, which was used to attach the PEC to the docking module.

The first experiment, Polished Plate Micrometeoroid and Debris (PPMD), consisted of gold, aluminium, and zinc plates and studied how often space debris hit the station, the sizes and sources of the debris, and the damage the debris might do on hitting a space station.

The second, the Orbital Debris Collector (ODC), captured orbital debris in aerogel cells for return to Earth to determine the possible origins and components of that debris.

The last two experiments, Passive Optical Sample Assemblies I (POSA I) and II (POSA II), tested various materials intended for use on the International Space Station including paint samples, glass coatings, multilayer insulation, and a variety of metallic samples.

== History ==
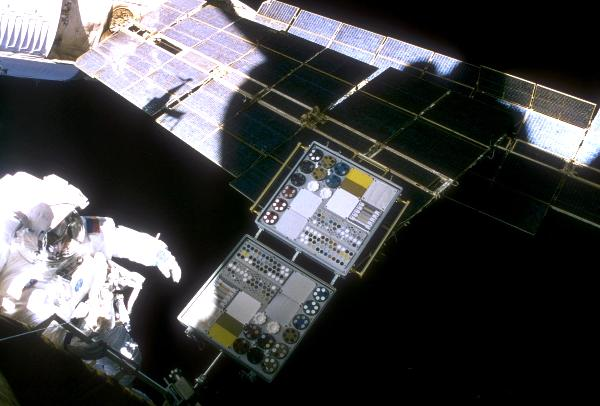
POSA I during deployment.

MEEP was designed to assess the magnitude of molecular contamination in ISS critical exterior surfaces in the space environment and to quantify the performance and degradation rate of candidate and selected ISS exterior surface materials. NASA's Langley Research Center had overall responsibility for MEEP as well as the development of the Passive Equipment Carriers as well as the PPMD experiment. Johnson Space Center was responsible for the ODC, Marshall Space Flight Center for POSA I and Boeing's Defence and Space Group for POSA II.

The MEEP experiment hardware was launched to Mir aboard Space Shuttle Atlantis on STS-76. The four experiments installed on the docking module during the only EVA of the mission, carried out by Michael Clifford and Linda Godwin on flight day six, 27 March 1996. MEEP remained attached to Mir for 18 months until 1 October 1997, when, during flight day seven of STS-86, the experiments were retrieved in an EVA by Vladimir Titov and Scott Parazynski. In addition to the MEEP experiments, a solar array which had been exposed to the space environment for more than ten years was removed from the core module of Mir in November 1997, and returned to Earth in January 1998 on STS-89. The experiments were then inspected and studied by teams of space environmental effects investigators for micrometeoroid and space debris effects, space exposure effects on materials, and electrical performance.

Also MEEPS can trace their inception to the Passive Optical Sample Array (POSA) sample trays flown on STS-1 and STS-2, and their successor Effects of Oxygen Interaction with Materials (EOIM) on STS-3 and STS-5.

== See also ==
- Long Duration Exposure Facility, NASA 1984–1990
- European Retrievable Carrier, 1992–1993
- Materials International Space Station Experiment, (1–8) from 2001
