= Shuttle–Mir program =

1993–1998 collaborative Russia–US space program

- Программа «Мир» — «Шаттл»

Program overview
- Country: Russia; United States
- Organization: PKA; NASA
- Status: Completed

Program history
- First flight: February 3, 1994 (STS-60)
- Last flight: June 2, 1998 (STS-91)
- Launch sites: Kennedy Space Center; Baikonur

Vehicle information
- Crewed vehicles: Space Shuttle; Mir; Soyuz

The Shuttle–Mir program (Russian: Программа «Мир»–«Шаттл») (Note: Like the earlier Apollo–Soyuz program, the Russian language version presents its vehicle name first, so the literal translation is ‘program “Mir”–“Shuttle”’) was a collaborative space program between Russia and the United States that involved American Space Shuttles visiting the Russian space station Mir, Russian cosmonauts flying on the Shuttle, and an American astronaut flying aboard a Soyuz spacecraft to allow American astronauts to engage in long-duration expeditions aboard Mir.

The project, sometimes called "Phase One", was intended to allow the United States to learn from Russian experience with long-duration spaceflight and to foster a spirit of cooperation between the two nations and their space agencies, the National Aeronautics and Space Administration (NASA) and the Russian Space Agency (RKA). The project helped to prepare the way for further cooperative space ventures; specifically, "Phase Two" of the joint project, the construction of the International Space Station (ISS). The program was announced in 1993, the first mission started in 1994 and the project continued until its scheduled completion in 1998. Eleven Space Shuttle missions, a joint Soyuz flight and almost 1,000 cumulative days in space for American astronauts occurred over the course of seven long-duration expeditions. In addition to Space Shuttle launches to Mir the United States also fully funded and equipped with scientific equipment the Spektr module (launched in 1995) and the Priroda module (launched in 1996), making them de facto U.S. modules during the duration of the Shuttle-Mir program.

During the four-year program, many firsts in spaceflight were achieved by the two nations, including the first American astronaut to launch aboard a Soyuz spacecraft, the largest spacecraft ever to have been assembled at that time in history, and the first American spacewalk using a Russian Orlan spacesuit.

The program was marred by various concerns, notably the safety of Mir following a fire, a Russian spacecraft colliding with Spektr rendering it uninhabitable, financial issues with the cash-strapped Russian space program and worries from astronauts about the attitudes of the program administrators. Nevertheless, a large amount of science, expertise in space station construction and knowledge in working in a cooperative space venture was gained from the combined operations, allowing the construction of the ISS to proceed much more smoothly than would have otherwise been the case.

== Background ==
A "Shuttle–Salyut" program was proposed in the 1970s, yet never realized. This rendering depicts a Space Shuttle docked to a second-generation Salyut space station, with a Soyuz spacecraft docked to Salyut's aft port.

The origins of the Shuttle–Mir program can be traced back to the 1975 Apollo–Soyuz Test Project, that resulted in a joint US/Soviet mission during the détente period of the Cold War and the docking between a US Apollo spacecraft and a Soviet Soyuz spacecraft. This was followed by the talks between NASA and Intercosmos in the 1970s about a "Shuttle–Salyut" program to fly Space Shuttle missions to a Salyut space station, with later talks in the 1980s even considering flights of the future Soviet shuttles from the Buran program to a future US space station – this "Shuttle–Salyut" program never materialized however during the existence of the Soviet Intercosmos program.

This changed after the Dissolution of the Soviet Union: the end of Cold War and Space Race resulted in funding for the US modular space station (originally named Freedom), which was planned since the early 1980s, being slashed. Similar budgetary difficulties were being faced by other nations with space station projects, prompting American government officials to start negotiations with partners in Europe, Russia, Japan, and Canada in the early 1990s to begin a collaborative, multi-national, space station project. In the Russian Federation, as the successor to much of the Soviet Union and its space program, the deteriorating economic situation in the post-Soviet economic chaos led to growing financial problems of the now Russian space station program. The construction of the Mir-2 space station as a replacement for the aging Mir became illusionary, though only after its base block, DOS-8, had been built. These developments resulted in bringing the former adversaries together with the Shuttle–Mir Program, which would pave the way to the International Space Station, a joint project with several international partners.

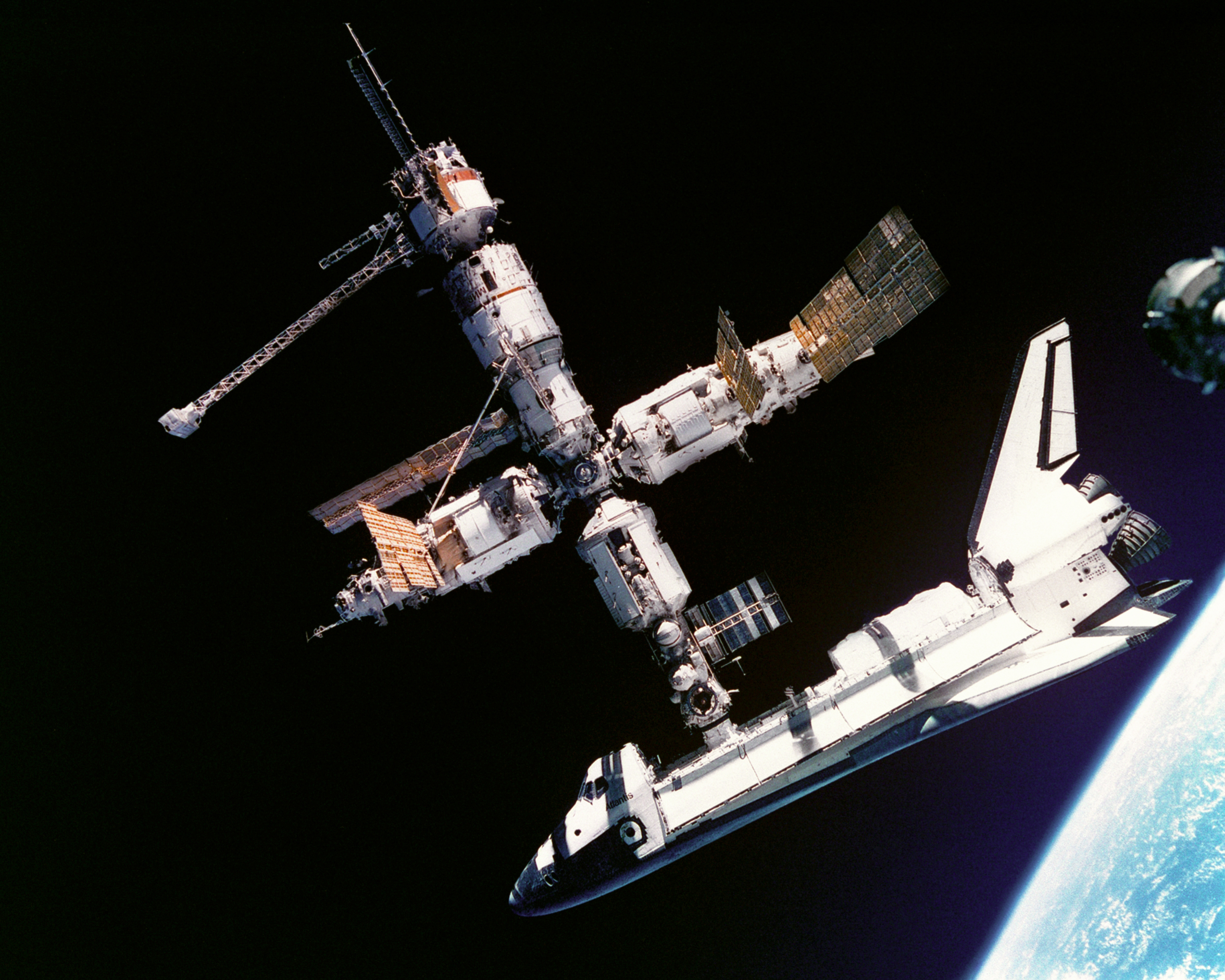
Space Shuttle Atlantis docked to Mir on STS-71

In June 1992, American President George H. W. Bush and Russian president Boris Yeltsin agreed to co-operate on space exploration by signing the Agreement between the United States of America and the Russian Federation Concerning Cooperation in the Exploration and Use of Outer Space for Peaceful Purposes. This agreement called for setting up a short, joint space project, during which one American astronaut would board the Russian space station Mir and two Russian cosmonauts would board a Space Shuttle.

In September 1993, American Vice-President Al Gore Jr., and Russian Prime Minister Viktor Chernomyrdin announced plans for a new space station, which eventually became the International Space Station. They also agreed, in preparation for this new project, that the United States would be heavily involved in the Mir project in the years ahead, under the code name "Phase One" (the construction of the ISS being "Phase Two").

The first Space Shuttle flight to Mir was a rendezvous mission without docking on STS-63. This was followed during the course of the project by nine Shuttle–Mir docking missions, from STS-71 to STS-91. The Shuttle rotated crews and delivered supplies, and one mission, STS-74, carried a docking module and a pair of solar arrays to Mir. Various scientific experiments were also conducted, both on shuttle flights and long-term aboard the station. The project also saw the launch of two new modules, Spektr and Priroda, to Mir, which were used by American astronauts as living quarters and laboratories to conduct the majority of their science aboard the station. These missions allowed NASA and Roscosmos to learn a great deal about how best to work with international partners in space and how to minimize the risks associated with assembling a large space station in orbit, as would have to be done with the ISS.

The project also served as a political ruse on the part of the American government, providing a diplomatic channel for NASA to take part in the funding of the cripplingly under-funded Russian space program. This in turn allowed the newly fledged Russian government to keep Mir operating, in addition to the Russian space program as a whole, ensuring the Russian government remained friendly towards the United States.

=== Increments ===
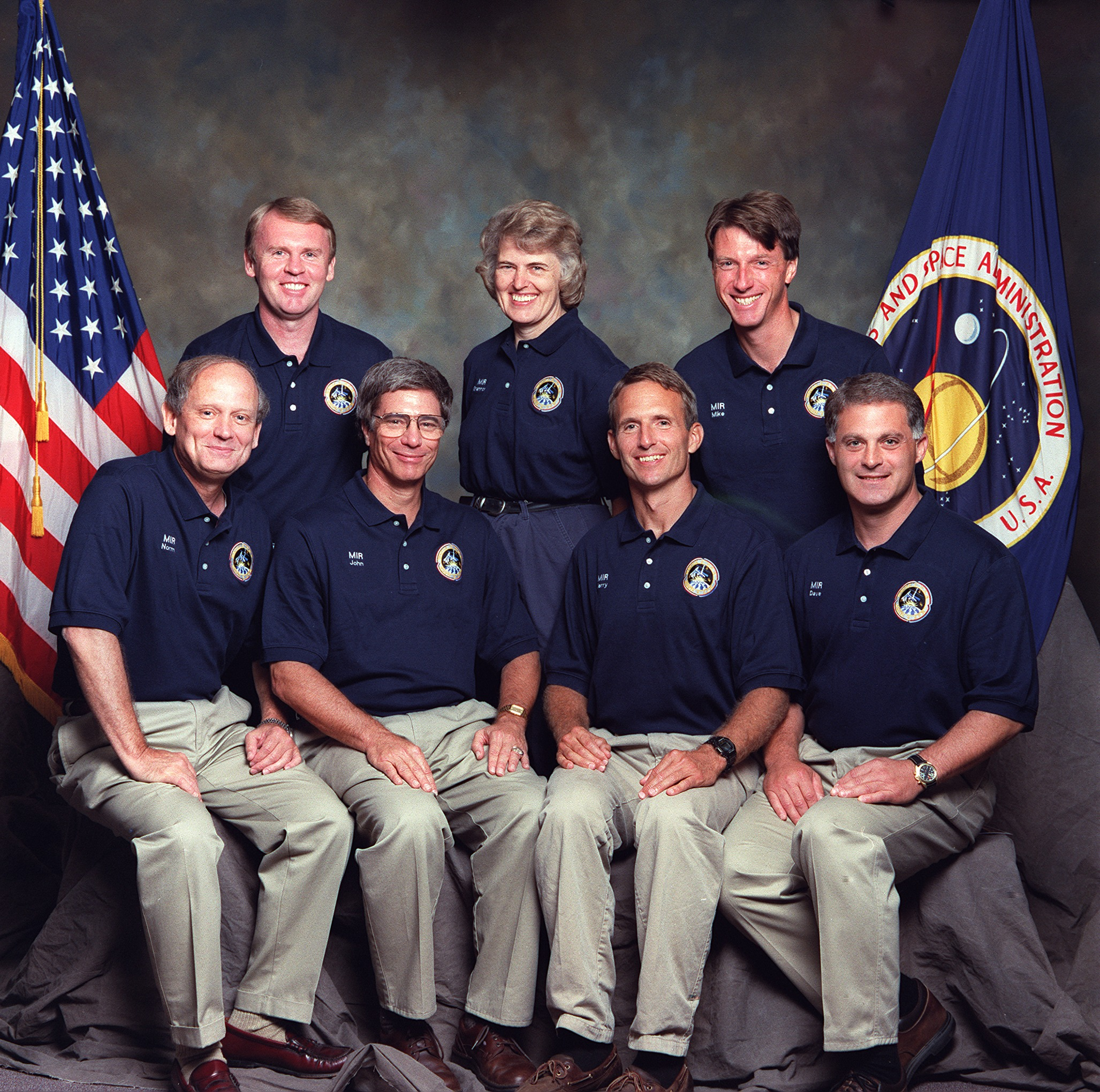
The seven American astronauts who carried out long-duration Increments on Mir

In addition to the flights of the Shuttle to Mir, Phase One also featured seven "Increments" aboard the station, long-duration flights aboard Mir by American astronauts. The seven astronauts who took part in the Increments, Norman Thagard, Shannon Lucid, John Blaha, Jerry Linenger, Michael Foale, David Wolf and Andrew Thomas, were each flown in turn to Star City, Russia, to undergo training in various aspects of the operation of Mir and the Soyuz spacecraft used for transport to and from the Station. The astronauts also received practice in carrying out spacewalks outside Mir and lessons in the Russian language, which would be used throughout their missions to talk with the other cosmonauts aboard the station and Mission Control in Russia, the TsUP.

During their expeditions aboard Mir, the astronauts carried out various experiments, including growth of crops and crystals, and took hundreds of photographs of the Earth. They also assisted in the maintenance and repair of the aging station, following various incidents with fires, collisions, power losses, uncontrolled spins and toxic leaks. In all, the American astronauts would spend almost a thousand days aboard Mir, allowing NASA to learn a great deal about long-duration spaceflight, particularly in the areas of astronaut psychology and how best to arrange experiment schedules for crews aboard space stations.

=== Mir ===
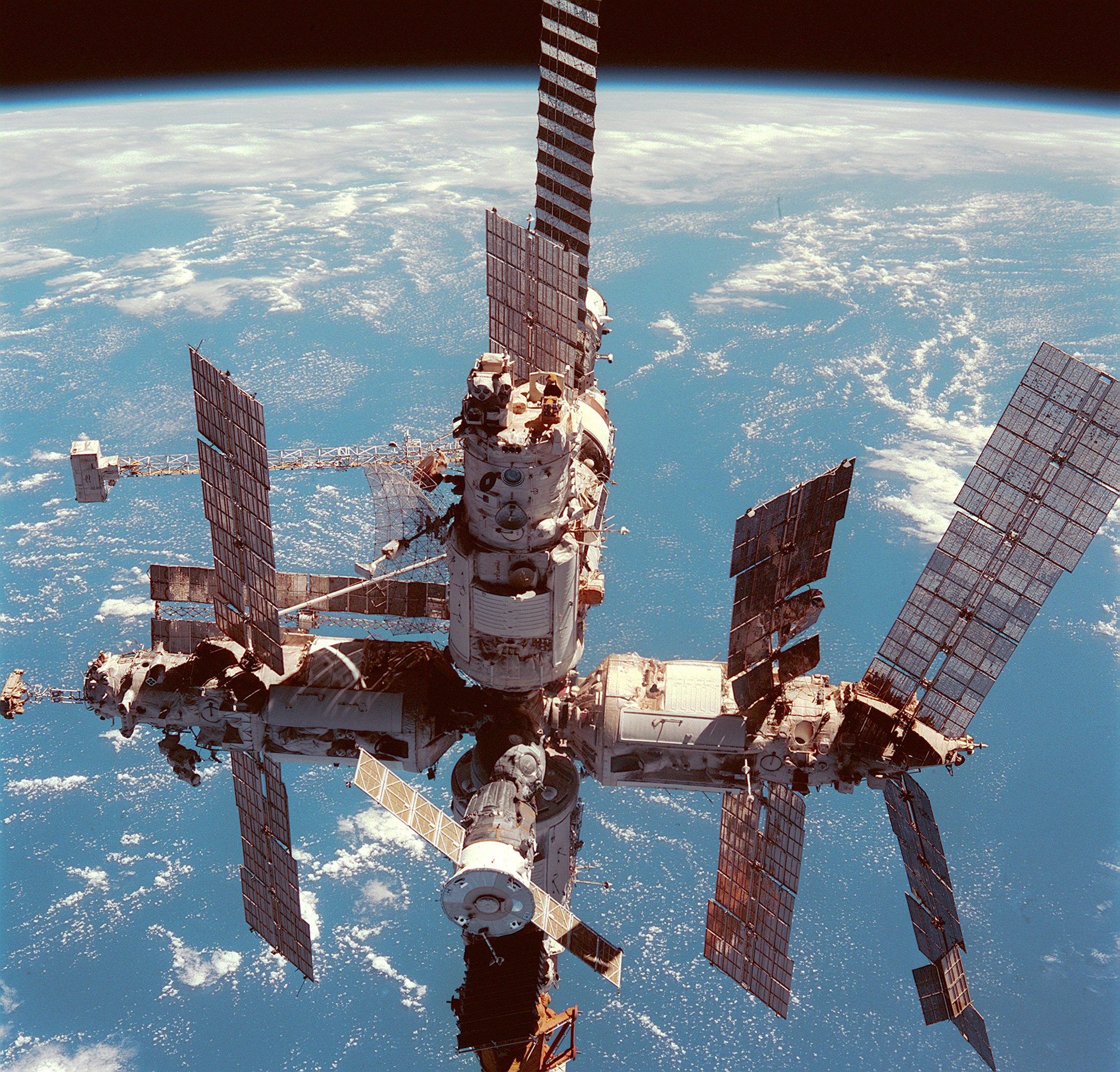
The view of Mir from Space Shuttle Discovery in 1998 as it left the station during STS-91

Mir was constructed between 1986 and 1996 and was the world's first modular space station. It was the first consistently inhabited long-term research station in space, and previously held the record for longest continuous human presence in space, at eight days short of ten years. Mir's purpose was to provide a large and habitable scientific laboratory in space, and, through a number of collaborations, including Intercosmos and Shuttle–Mir, was made internationally accessible to cosmonauts and astronauts of many different countries. The station existed until March 23, 2001, at which point it was deliberately deorbited, and broke apart during atmospheric re-entry.

Mir was based upon the Salyut series of space stations previously launched by the Soviet Union (seven Salyut space stations had been launched since 1971), and was mainly serviced by Russian-crewed Soyuz spacecraft and Progress cargo ships. The Buran space shuttle was anticipated to visit Mir, but its program was canceled after its first uncrewed spaceflight. Visiting US Space Shuttles used an Androgynous Peripheral Attach System docking collar originally designed for Buran, mounted on a bracket originally designed for use with the American Space Station Freedom.

With the Space Shuttle docked to Mir, the temporary enlargements of living and working areas amounted to a complex that was the world's largest spacecraft at that time, with a combined mass of 250 metric tons (250 long tons; 280 short tons).

=== Space Shuttle ===
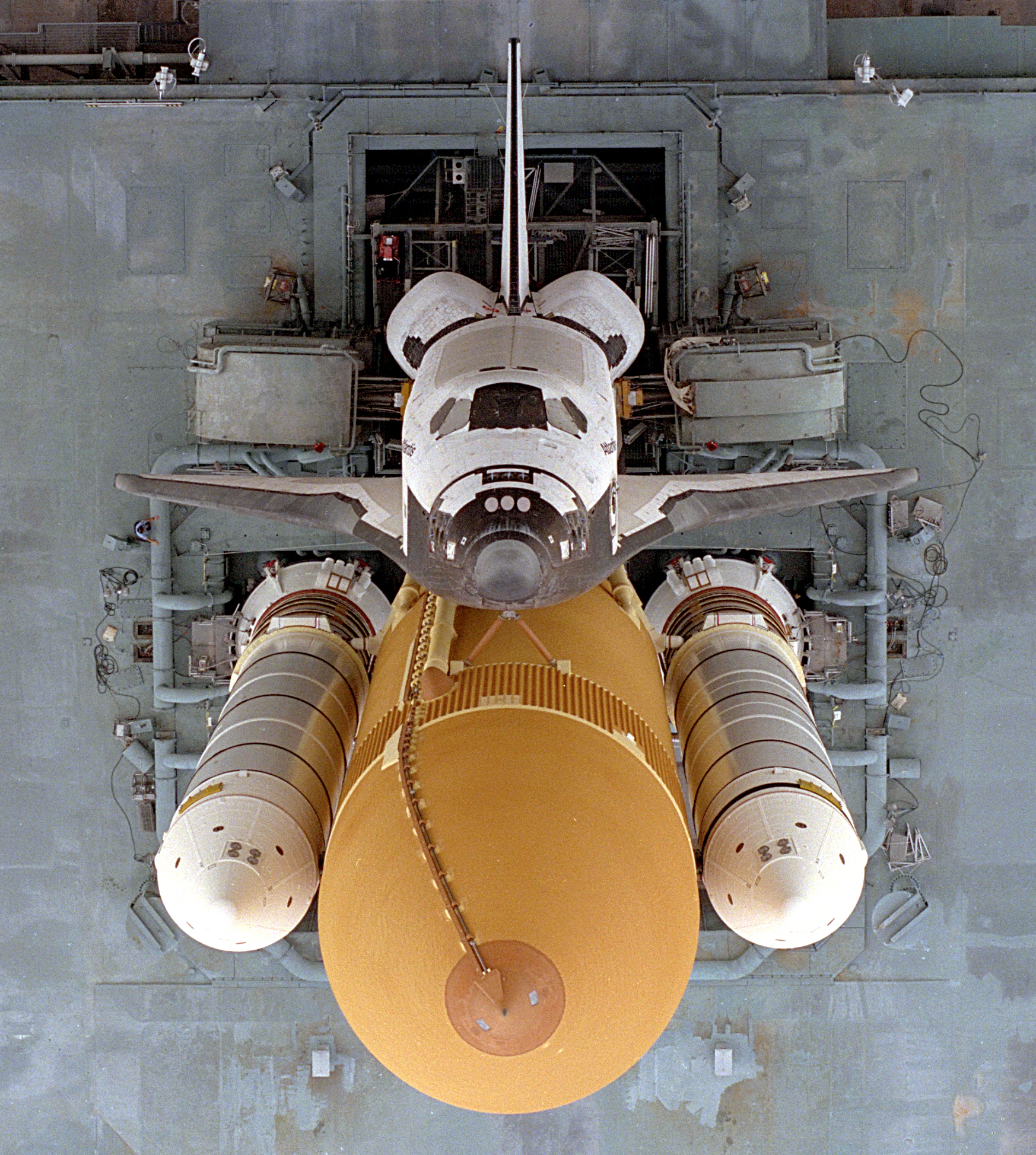
An overhead view of Atlantis as it sits atop the Mobile Launcher Platform (MLP) before STS-79

The Space Shuttle was a partially reusable low Earth orbital spacecraft system that was operated from 1981 to 2011 by the U.S. National Aeronautics and Space Administration (NASA) as part of the Space Shuttle program. Its official program name was Space Transportation System (STS), taken from a 1969 plan for a system of reusable spacecraft of which it was the only item funded for development. The first of four orbital test flights occurred in 1981, leading to operational flights beginning in 1982. In addition to the prototype, whose completion was cancelled, five complete Shuttle systems were built and used on a total of 135 missions from 1981 to 2011, launched from the Kennedy Space Center (KSC) in Florida. The Shuttle fleet's total mission time was 1322 days, 19 hours, 21 minutes and 23 seconds.

The Space Shuttle carried large payloads to various orbits, and, during the Shuttle–Mir and ISS programs, provided crew rotation and carried various supplies, modules and pieces of equipment to the stations. Each Shuttle was designed for a projected lifespan of 100 launches or 10 years' operational life.

Nine docking missions were flown to Mir, from 1995 to 1997 during "Phase One": Space Shuttle Atlantis docked seven times to Mir, with Discovery and Endeavour each flying one docking mission to Mir. As Space Shuttle Columbia was the oldest and heaviest of the fleet, it was not suited for efficient operations at Mir's (and later the ISS's) 51.6-degree inclination – Columbia was therefore not retrofitted with the necessary external airlock and Orbital Docking System, and never flew to a space station.

== Timeline ==
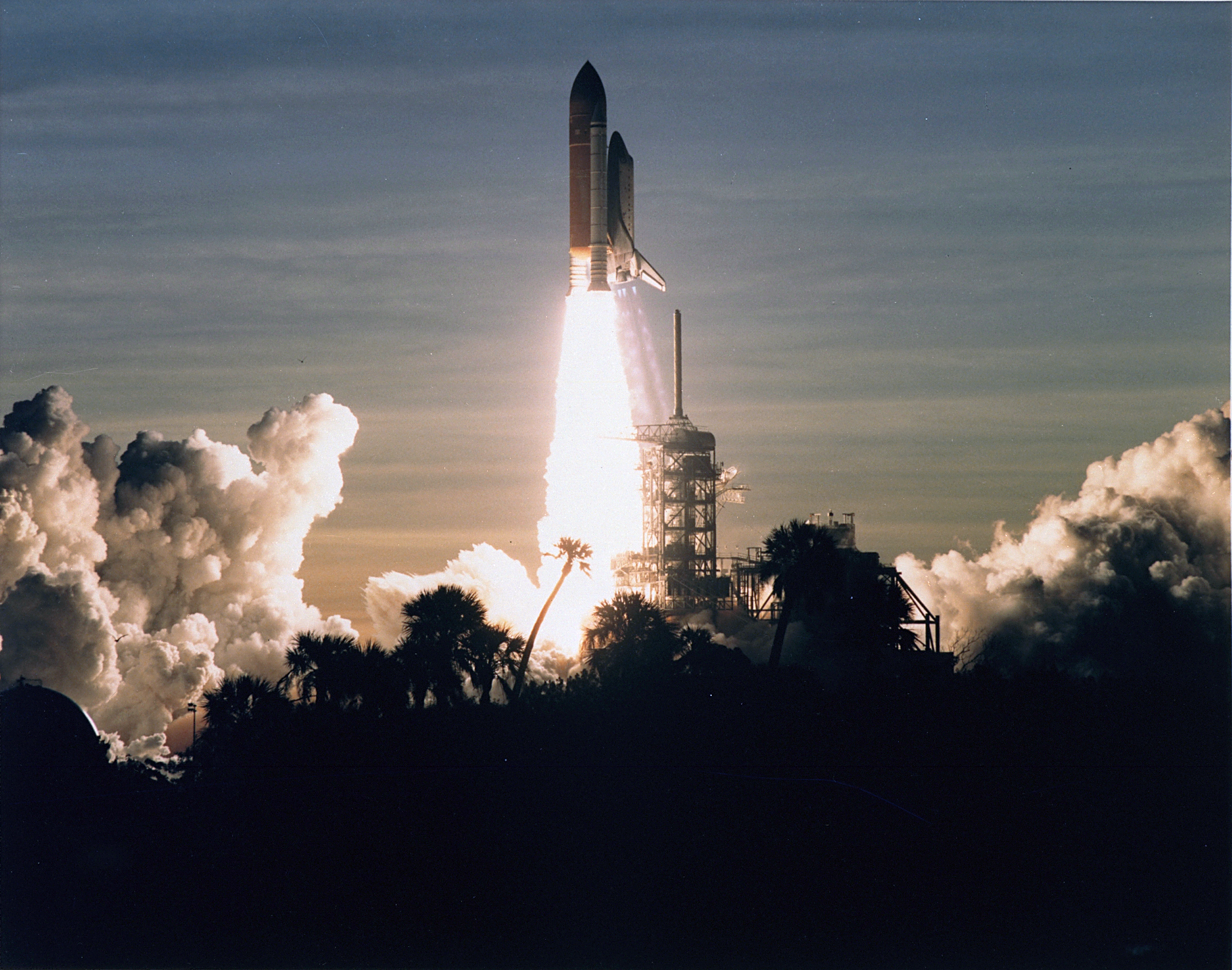
The Shuttle–Mir program begins—Discovery launches on STS-60, the first flight of the program.

=== New cooperation begins (1994) ===
Phase One of the Shuttle–Mir program began on February 3, 1994, with the launch of Space Shuttle Discovery on its 18th mission, STS-60. The eight-day mission was the first shuttle flight of that year, the first flight of a Russian cosmonaut, Sergei Krikalev, aboard the American shuttle, and marked the start of increased cooperation in space for the two nations, 37 years after the Space Race began. Part of an international agreement on human space flight, the mission was the second flight of the Spacehab pressurized module and marked the hundredth "Getaway Special" payload to fly in space. The primary payload for the mission was the Wake Shield Facility (or WSF), a device designed to generate new semiconductor films for advanced electronics. The WSF was flown at the end of Discovery's robotic arm over the course of the flight. During the mission, the astronauts aboard Discovery also carried out various experiments aboard the Spacehab module in the Orbiter's payload bay, and took part in a live bi-directional audio and downlink video hookup between themselves and the three cosmonauts on board Mir, Valeri Polyakov, Viktor Afanasyev and Yury Usachev (flying Mir expeditions LD-4 and EO-15).

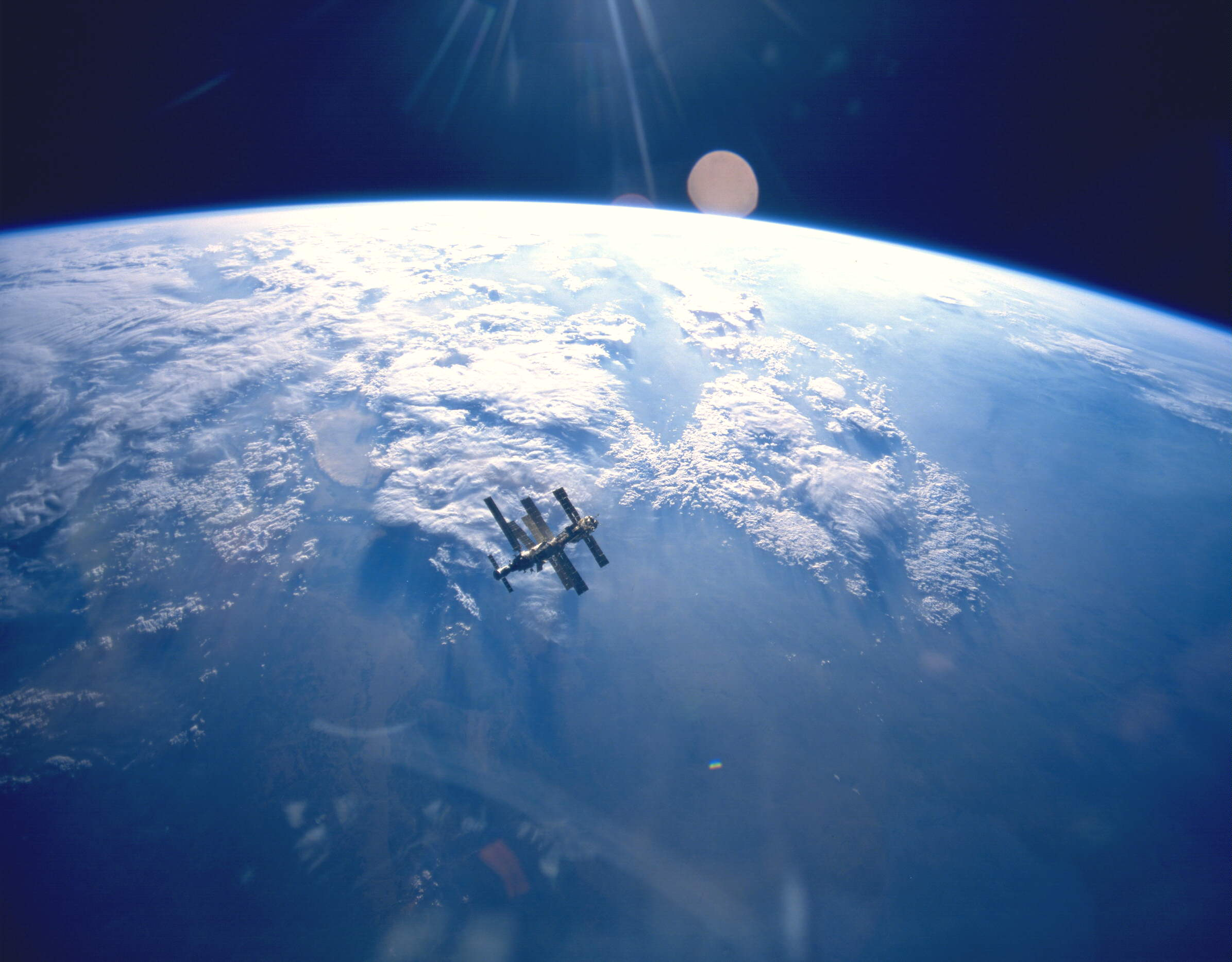
A view of Mir following Atlantis's undocking at the end of STS-71

=== America arrives at Mir (1995) ===
1995 began with the launch of the Space Shuttle Discovery on February 3. Discovery's mission, STS-63, was the second Space Shuttle flight in the program and the first flight of the shuttle with a female pilot, Eileen Collins. Referred to as the "near-Mir" mission, the eight-day flight saw the first rendezvous of a Space Shuttle with Mir, as Russian cosmonaut Vladimir Titov and the rest of Discovery's crew approached within 37 feet (11 m) of Mir. Following the rendezvous, Collins performed a flyaround of the station. The mission, a dress rehearsal for the first docked mission in the program, STS-71, also carried out testing of various techniques and pieces of equipment that would be used during the docking missions that followed.

Five weeks after Discovery's flight, the March 14 launch of Soyuz TM-21 carried expedition EO-18 to Mir. The crew consisted of cosmonauts Vladimir Dezhurov and Gennady Strekalov and NASA astronaut Norman Thagard, who became the first American to fly into space aboard the Soyuz spacecraft. During the course of their 115-day expedition, the Spektr science module (which served as living and working space for American astronauts) was launched aboard a Proton rocket and docked to Mir. Spektr carried more than 1,500 pounds (680 kg) of research equipment from America and other nations. The expedition's crew returned to Earth aboard Space Shuttle Atlantis following the first Shuttle–Mir docking during mission STS-71.

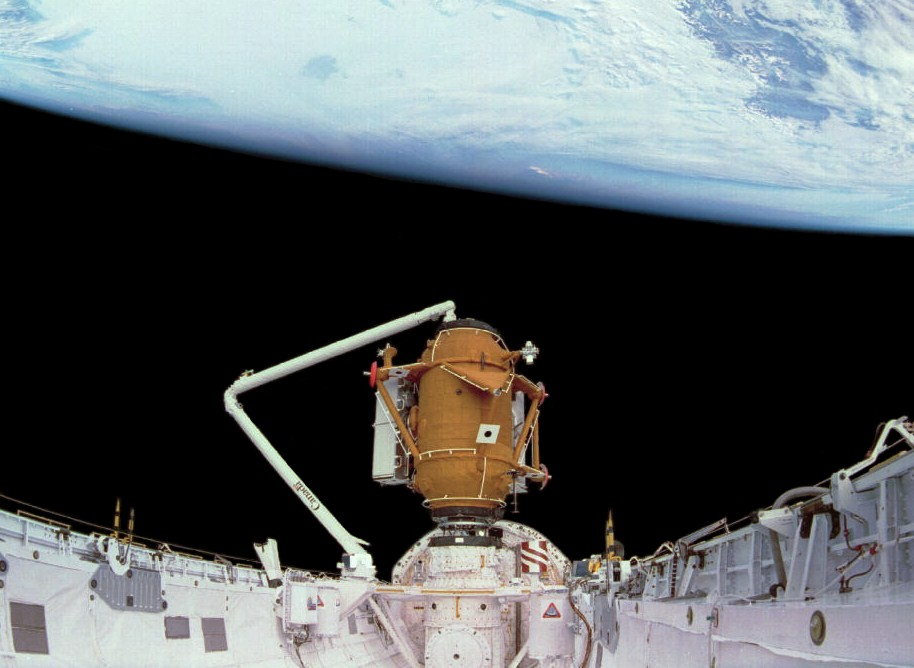
The Mir Docking Module, positioned in Atlantis's payload bay on STS-74, ready to be docked to Kristall

The primary objectives of STS-71, launched on June 27, called for the Space Shuttle Atlantis to rendezvous and perform the first docking between an American Space Shuttle and the station. On June 29, Atlantis successfully docked with Mir, becoming the first US spacecraft to dock with a Russian spacecraft since the Apollo-Soyuz Test Project in 1975. Atlantis delivered cosmonauts Anatoly Solovyev and Nikolai Budarin, who would form the expedition EO-19 crew, and retrieved astronaut Norman Thagard and cosmonauts Vladimir Dezhurov and Gennady Strekalov of the expedition EO-18 crew. Atlantis also carried out on-orbit joint US-Russian life sciences investigations aboard a Spacelab module and performed a logistical resupply of the station.

The final Shuttle flight of 1995, STS-74, began with the November 12 launch of Space Shuttle Atlantis, and delivered the Russian-built Docking Module to Mir, along with a new pair of solar arrays and other hardware upgrades for the station. The Docking Module was designed to provide more clearance for Shuttles in order to prevent any collisions with Mir's solar arrays during docking, a problem which had been overcome during STS-71 by relocating the station's Kristall module to a different location on the station. The module, attached to Kristall's docking port, prevented the need for this procedure on further missions. During the course of the flight, nearly 1,000 pounds (450 kg) of water were transferred to Mir and experiment samples including blood, urine and saliva were moved to Atlantis for return to Earth.

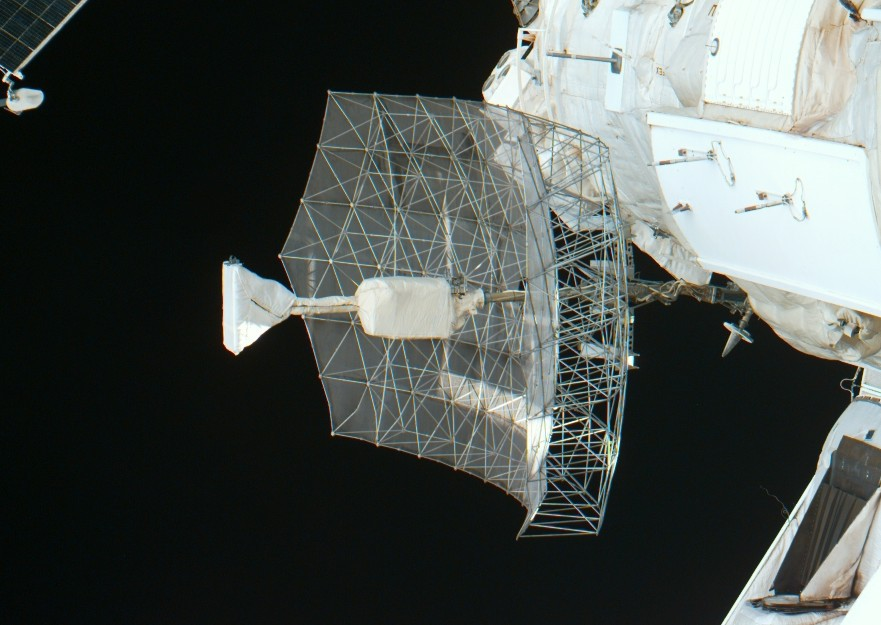
A view of the Travers RADAR antenna on the newly launched Priroda module during STS-79

=== Priroda (1996) ===
Continuous US presence aboard Mir started in 1996 with the March 22 launch of Atlantis on mission STS-76, when the Second Increment astronaut Shannon Lucid was transferred to the station. STS-76 was the third docking mission to Mir, which also demonstrated logistics capabilities through deployment of a Spacehab module, and placed experiment packages aboard Mir's docking module, which marked the first spacewalk which occurred around docked vehicles. The spacewalks, carried out from Atlantis's crew cabin, provided valuable experience for astronauts in order to prepare for later assembly missions to the International Space Station.

Lucid became the first American woman to live on station, and, following a six-week extension to her Increment due to issues with Shuttle Solid Rocket Boosters, her 188-day mission set the US single spaceflight record. During Lucid's time aboard Mir, the Priroda module, with about 2,200 pounds (1,000 kg) of US science hardware, was docked to Mir. Lucid made use of both Priroda and Spektr to carry out 28 different science experiments and as living quarters.

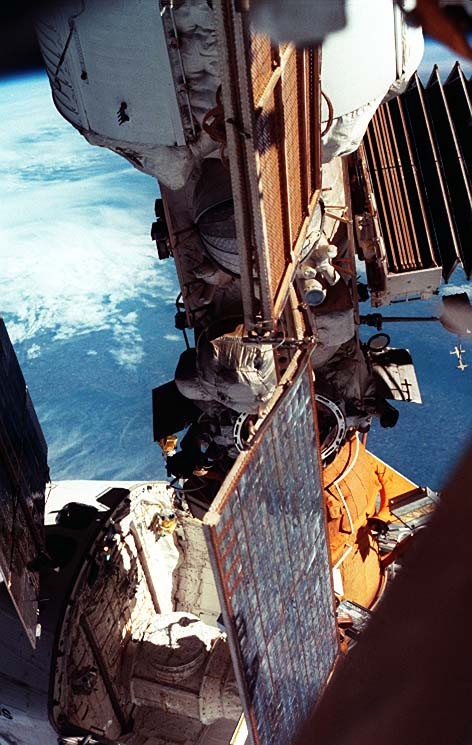
Space Shuttle Atlantis docked to Mir during STS-81. The crew compartment, nose and a portion of the payload bay of Atlantis are visible, behind Mir's Kristall and Docking Modules.

Her stay aboard Mir ended with the flight of Atlantis on STS-79, which launched on September 16. STS-79 was the first Shuttle mission to carry a double Spacehab module. More than 4,000 pounds (1,800 kg) of supplies were transferred to Mir, including water generated by Atlantis's fuel cells, and experiments that included investigations into superconductors, cartilage development, and other biology studies. About 2,000 pounds (910 kg) of experiment samples and equipment were also transferred back from Mir to Atlantis, making the total transfer the most extensive yet.

This, the fourth docking, also saw John Blaha transferring onto Mir to take his place as resident Increment astronaut. His stay on the station improved operations in several areas, including transfer procedures for a docked space shuttle, "hand-over" procedures for long-duration American crew members and "Ham" amateur radio communications.

Two spacewalks were carried out during his time aboard. Their aim was to remove electrical power connectors from a 12-year-old solar power array on the base block and reconnect the cables to the more efficient new solar power arrays. In all, Blaha spent four months with the Mir-22 cosmonaut crew conducting material science, fluid science, and life science research, before returning to Earth the next year aboard Atlantis on STS-81.

=== Fire and collision (1997) ===
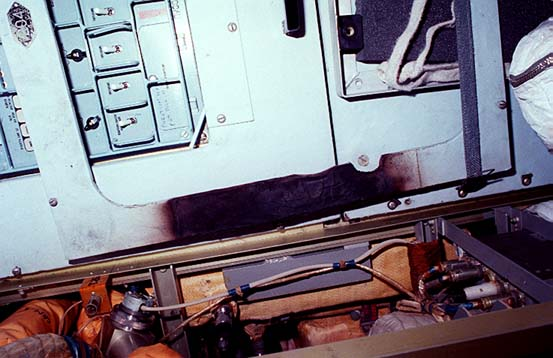
A charred panel onboard Mir following the fire

In 1997 STS-81 replaced Increment astronaut John Blaha with Jerry Linenger, after Blaha's 118-day stay aboard Mir. During this fifth shuttle docking, the crew of Atlantis moved supplies to the station and returned to Earth the first plants to complete a life cycle in space; a crop of wheat planted by Shannon Lucid. During five days of mated operations, the crews transferred nearly 6,000 pounds (2,700 kg) of logistics to Mir, and transferred 2,400 pounds (1,100 kg) of materials back to Atlantis (the most materials transferred between the two spacecraft to that date).

The STS-81 crew also tested the Shuttle Treadmill Vibration Isolation and Stabilization System (TVIS), designed for use in the Zvezda module of the International Space Station. The shuttle's small vernier jet thrusters were fired during the mated operations to gather engineering data for "reboosting" the ISS. After undocking, Atlantis performed a fly-around of Mir, leaving Linenger aboard the station.

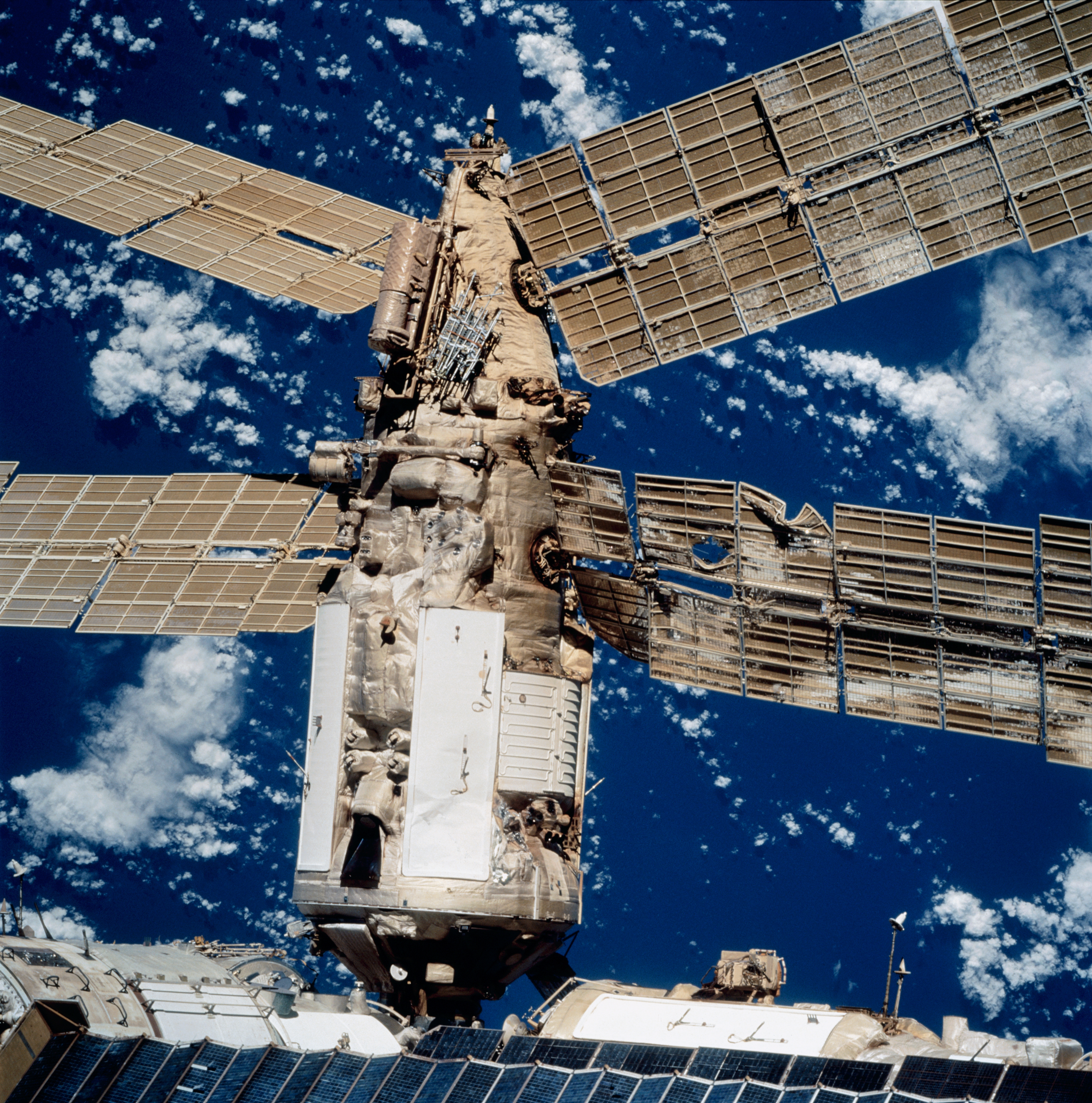
Picture of the damage caused by the collision with Progress M-34, taken by Atlantis during STS-86

During his Increment, Linenger became the first American to conduct a spacewalk from a foreign space station and the first to test the Russian-built Orlan-M spacesuit alongside Russian cosmonaut Vasili Tsibliyev. All three crewmembers of expedition EO-23 performed a "fly-around" in the Soyuz spacecraft, first undocking from one docking port of the station, then manually flying to and redocking the capsule at a different location. This made Linenger the first American to undock from a space station aboard two different spacecraft (Space Shuttle and Soyuz).

Linenger and his Russian crewmates Vasili Tsibliyev and Aleksandr Lazutkin faced several difficulties during the mission. These included the most severe fire aboard an orbiting spacecraft (caused by a backup oxygen-generating device), failures of various on board systems, a near collision with a Progress resupply cargo ship during a long-distance manual docking system test and a total loss of station electrical power. The power failure also caused a loss of attitude control, which led to an uncontrolled "tumble" through space.

The next NASA astronaut to stay on Mir was Michael Foale. Foale and Russian mission specialist Elena Kondakova boarded Mir from Atlantis on mission STS-84. The STS-84 crew transferred 249 items between the two spacecraft, along with water, experiment samples, supplies and hardware. One of the first items transferred to Mir was an Elektron oxygen-generating unit. Atlantis was stopped three times while backing away during the undocking sequence on May 21. The aim was to collect data from a European sensor device designed for future rendezvous of ESA's Automated Transfer Vehicle (ATV) with the International Space Station.

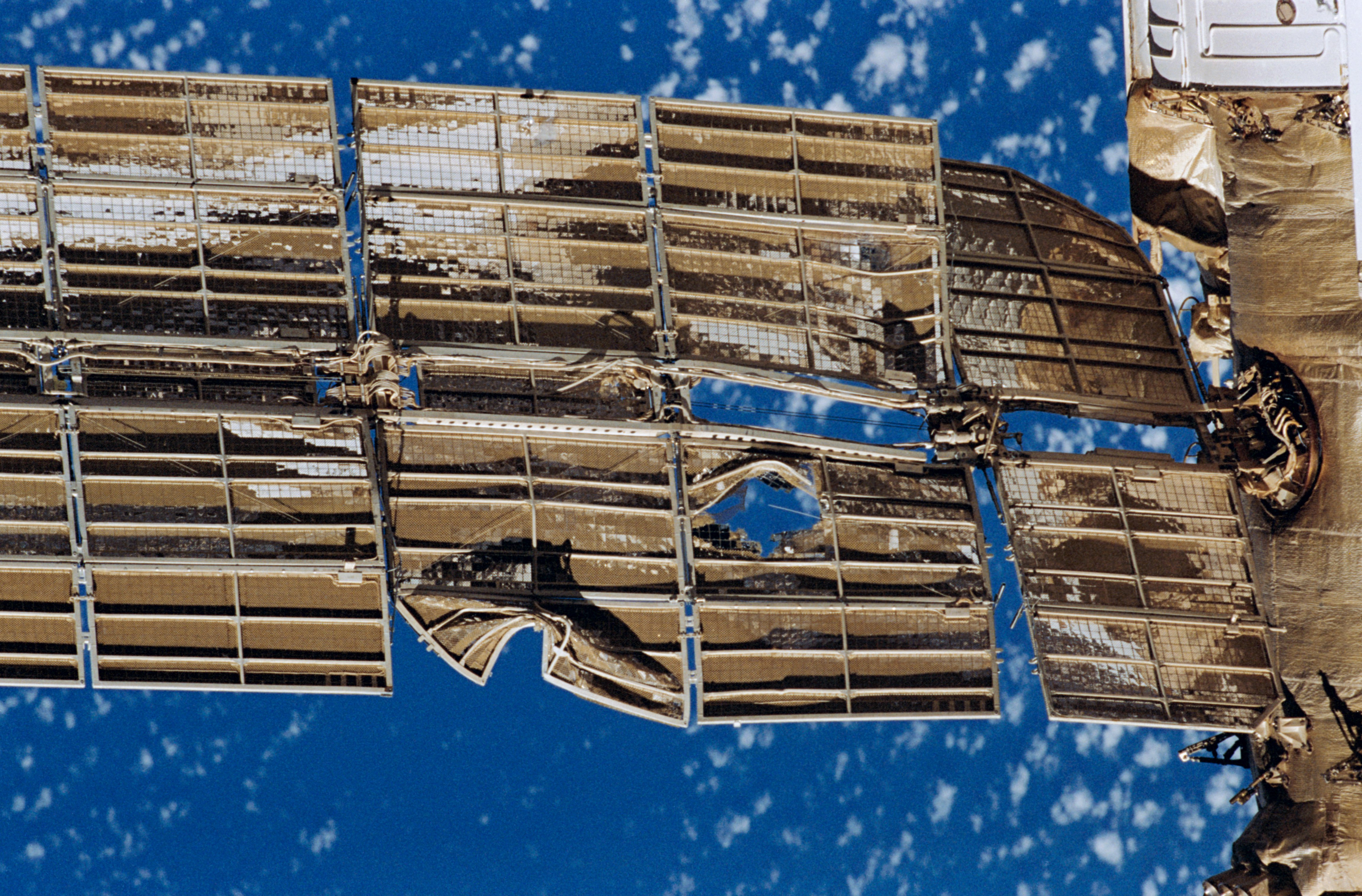
Damaged solar arrays on Mir's Spektr module following a collision with an uncrewed Progress spacecraft in September 1997

Foale's Increment proceeded fairly normally until June 25, when a resupply ship collided with solar arrays on the Spektr module during the second test of the Progress manual docking system, TORU. The module's outer shell was hit and holed, which caused the station to lose pressure. This was the first on-orbit depressurization in the history of spaceflight. The crew quickly cut cables leading to the module and closed Spektr's hatch in order to prevent the need to abandon the station in their Soyuz lifeboat. Their efforts stabilized the station's air pressure, whilst the pressure in Spektr, containing many of Foale's experiments and personal effects, dropped to a vacuum. Fortunately, food, water and other vital supplies were stored in other modules, and salvage and replanning effort by Foale and the science community minimized the loss of research data and capability.

In an effort to restore some of the power and systems lost following the isolation of Spektr and to attempt to locate the leak, Mir's new commander Anatoly Solovyev and flight engineer Pavel Vinogradov carried out a salvage operation later in the mission. They entered the empty module during a so-called "IVA" spacewalk, inspecting the condition of hardware and running cables through a special hatch from Spektr's systems to the rest of the station. Following these first investigations, Foale and Solovyev conducted a 6-hour EVA on the surface of Spektr to inspect the damaged module.

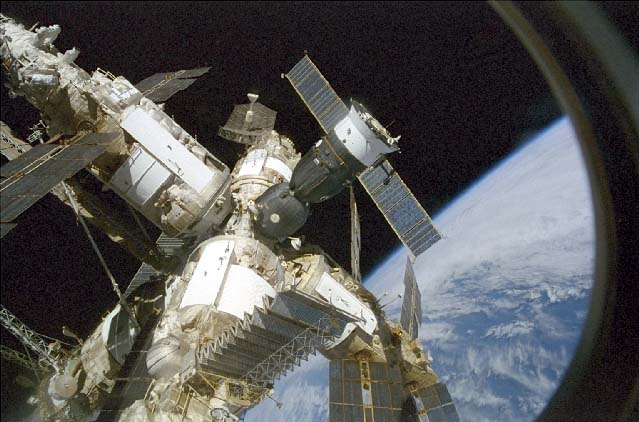
A view of Mir from Atlantis's window, showing several of the station's modules and the docked Soyuz capsule

After these incidents, the US Congress and NASA considered whether to abandon the program out of concern for astronauts' safety but NASA administrator Daniel Goldin decided to continue the program. The next flight to Mir, STS-86, brought Increment astronaut David Wolf to the station.

STS-86 performed the seventh Shuttle–Mir docking, the last of 1997. During Atlantis's stay crew members Titov and Parazynski conducted the first joint US–Russian extravehicular activity during a Shuttle mission, and the first in which a Russian wore a US spacesuit. During the five-hour spacewalk, the pair affixed a 121-pound (55 kg) Solar Array Cap to the Docking Module, for a future attempt by crew members to seal off the leak in Spektr's hull. The mission returned Foale to Earth, along with samples, hardware, and an old Elektron oxygen generator, and dropped Wolf off on the Station ready for his 128-day Increment. Wolf had originally been scheduled to be the final Mir astronaut, but was chosen to go on the Increment instead of astronaut Wendy Lawrence. Lawrence was deemed ineligible for flight because of a change in Russian requirements after the Progress supply vehicle collision. The new rules required that all Mir crew members should be trained and ready for spacewalks, but a Russian spacesuit could not be prepared for Lawrence in time for launch.

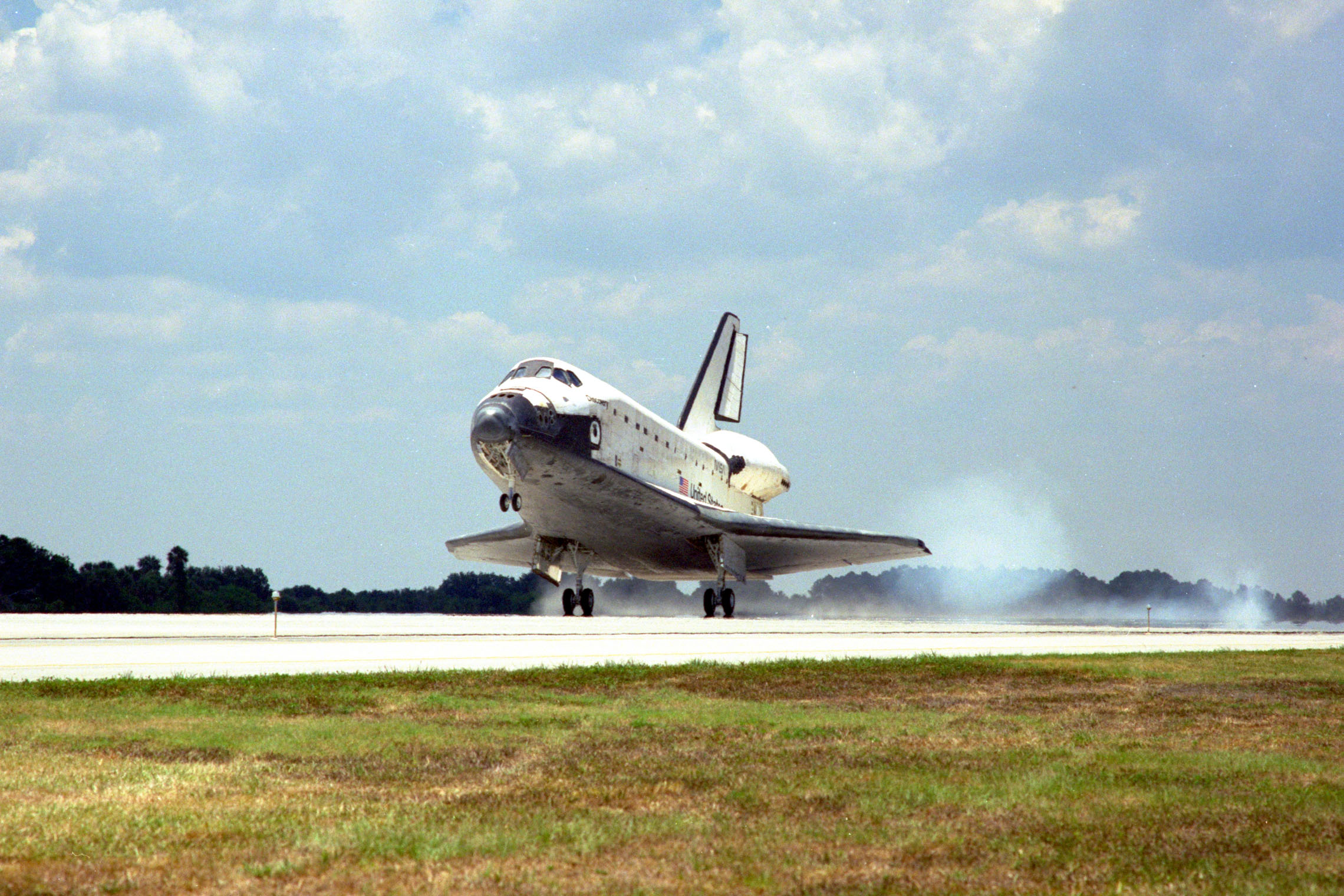
Space Shuttle Discovery lands at the end of STS-91 on 12 June 1998, bringing the Shuttle–Mir program to a close.

=== Phase One closes down (1998) ===
The final year of Phase One began with the flight of Space Shuttle Endeavour on STS-89. The mission delivered cosmonaut Salizhan Sharipov to Mir and replaced David Wolf with Andy Thomas, following Wolf's 119-day Increment.

During his Increment, the last of the program, Thomas worked on 27 science investigations into areas of advanced technology, Earth sciences, human life sciences, microgravity research, and ISS risk mitigation. His stay on Mir, considered the smoothest of the entire Phase One program, featured weekly "Letters from the Outpost" from Thomas and passed two milestones for length of spaceflight—815 consecutive days in space by American astronauts since the launch of Shannon Lucid on the STS-76 mission in March 1996, and 907 days of Mir occupancy by American astronauts dating back to Norman Thagard's trip to Mir in March 1995.

Thomas returned to Earth on the final Shuttle–Mir mission, STS-91. The mission closed out Phase One, with the EO-25 and STS-91 crews transferring water to Mir and exchanging almost 4,700 pounds (2,100 kg) of cargo experiments and supplies between the two spacecraft. Long-term American experiments that had been on board Mir were also moved into Discovery. Hatches were closed for undocking at 9:07 a.m. Eastern Daylight Time (EDT) on June 8 and the spacecraft separated at 12:01 p.m. EDT that day.

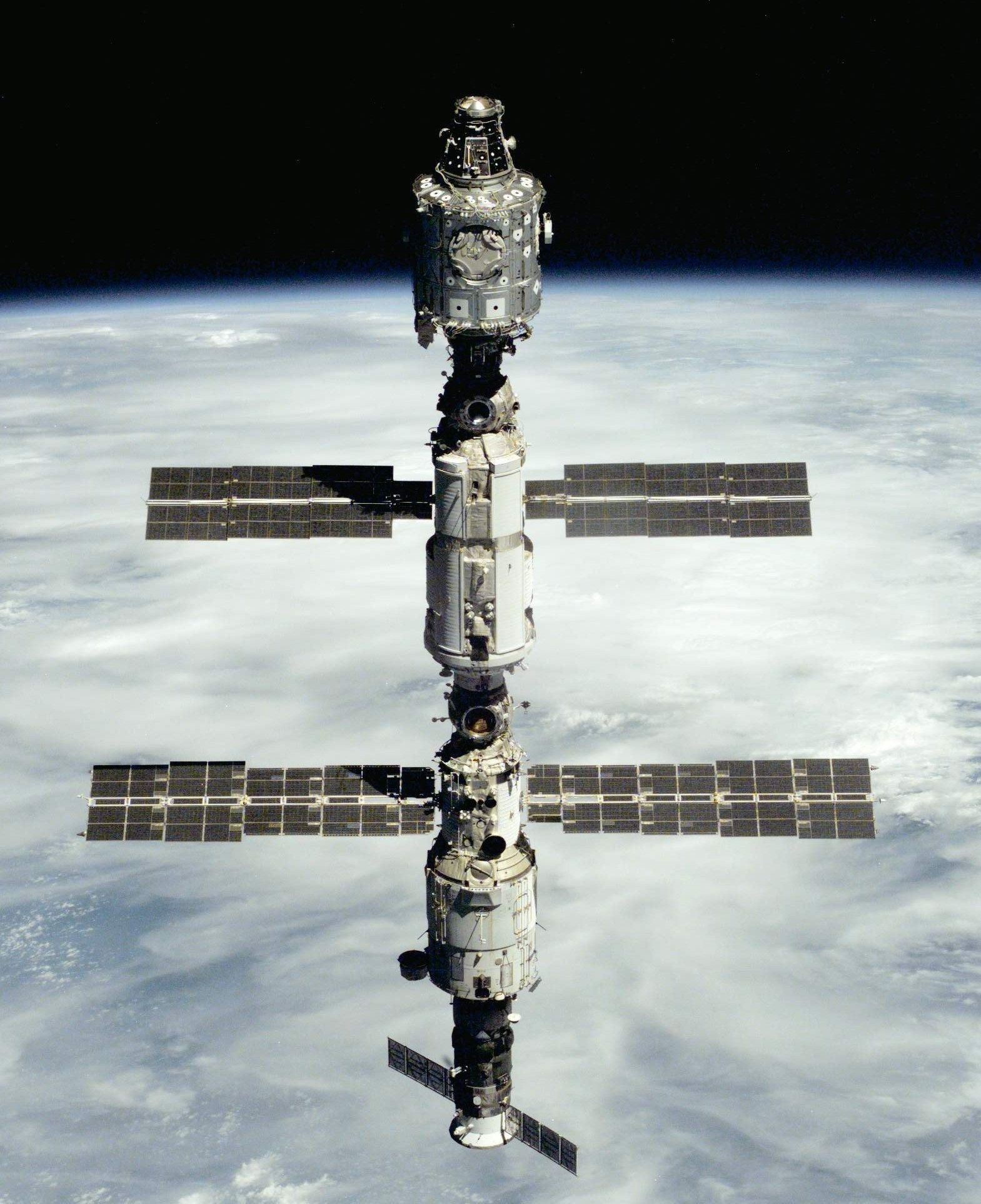
The International Space Station, Phase Two of the ISS program

=== Phases Two and Three: ISS (1998–present) ===
With the landing of Discovery on June 12, 1998, the Phase One program concluded. Techniques and equipment developed during the program assisted the development of Phase Two: initial assembly of the International Space Station (ISS). The arrival of the Destiny Laboratory Module in 2001 marked the end of Phase Two and the start of Phase Three, the final outfitting of the station, completed in 2012.

In 2015, a reconfiguration of the American segment was completed to allow its docking ports to accommodate NASA-sponsored commercial crew vehicles, that were expected to start visiting the ISS in 2018.

As of June 2015, the ISS has a pressurized volume of 915 cubic metres (32,300 cu ft), and its pressurized modules total 51 metres (167 ft) in length, plus a large truss structure that spans 109 metres (358 ft), making it the largest spacecraft ever assembled. The completed station consists of five laboratories and is able to support six crew members. With over 332 cubic metres (11,700 cu ft) of habitable volume and a mass of 400,000 kilograms (880,000 lb) the completed station is almost twice the size of the combined Shuttle–Mir spacecraft.

Phases Two and Three are intended to continue both international cooperation in space and zero-gravity scientific research, particularly regarding long-duration spaceflight. By spring 2015, Roscosmos, NASA, and the Canadian Space Agency (CSA) have agreed to extend the ISS's mission from 2020 to 2024.

In 2018 that was then extended out to 2030. The results of this research will provide considerable information for long-duration expeditions to the Moon and flights to Mars.

Following the intentional deorbiting of Mir on 23 March 2001, the ISS became the only space station in orbit around Earth. It retained that distinction until the launch of Chinese Tiangong-1 space laboratory on 29 September 2011.

Mir's legacy lives on in the station, bringing together five space agencies in the cause of exploration and allowing those space agencies to prepare for their next leap into space, to the Moon, Mars and beyond.

=== Complete list of Shuttle–Mir missions ===
Mission	Launch Date	Shuttle	Patch	Crew	Notes
STS-60	3 February 1994	Discovery		(United States) Charles Bolden | (United States) Kenneth Reightler | (United States) N. Jan Davis | (United States) Ronald Sega | (Costa Rica) (United States) Franklin Chang Díaz | (Russia) Sergei Krikalev	First Russian cosmonaut on US spacecraft | Deployed the Wake Shield Facility | Carried the SpaceHab single module
STS-63	3 February 1995	Discovery		(United States) James Wetherbee | (United States) Eileen Collins | (United States) Bernard Harris | (United Kingdom) (United States) C. Michael Foale | (United States) Janice Voss | (Russia) Vladimir Titov	First Shuttle rendezvous with Mir
Soyuz TM-21	14 March 1995			(Russia) Vladimir Dezhurov | (Russia) Gennady Strekalov | (United States) Norman Thagard	First American astronaut on Russian spacecraft | Delivered Mir-EO-18 crew | Delivered Norman Thagard for long-duration stay
STS-71	27 June 1995	Atlantis		(United States) Robert Gibson | (United States) Charles Precourt | (United States) Ellen Baker | (United States) Gregory Harbaugh | (United States) Bonnie Dunbar | (Russia) Anatoly Solovyev | (Russia) Nikolai Budarin	First Shuttle–Mir docking | Delivered Mir EO-19 crew | Returned Mir EO-18 crew
STS-74	12 November 1995	Atlantis		(United States) Kenneth Cameron | (United States) James Halsell | (Canada) Chris Hadfield | (United States) Jerry Ross | (United States) William S. McArthur	Delivered the Mir Docking Module | Hadfield became first and only Canadian to visit Mir
STS-76	22 March 1996	Atlantis		(United States) Kevin Chilton | (United States) Richard Searfoss | (United States) Ronald Sega | (United States) Michael Clifford | (United States) Linda Godwin | (United States) Shannon Lucid	Delivered Shannon Lucid for long-duration stay | Carried the SpaceHab single module
STS-79	16 September 1996	Atlantis		(United States) William Readdy | (United States) Terrence Wilcutt | (United States) Jay Apt | (United States) Thomas Akers | (United States) Carl Walz | (United States) John Blaha	First flight of the SpaceHab double module | Delivered John Blaha for long-duration stay | Returned Shannon Lucid from long-duration stay
STS-81	12 January 1997	Atlantis		(United States) Michael Baker | (United States) Brent Jett | (United States) Peter Wisoff | (United States) John Grunsfeld | (United States) Marsha Ivins | (United States) Jerry Linenger	Delivered Jerry Linenger for long-duration stay | Returned John Blaha from long-duration stay
STS-84	15 May 1997	Atlantis		(United States) Charles Precourt | (United States) Eileen Collins | (France) Jean-François Clervoy | (Peru) (United States) Carlos Noriega | (United States) Edward Lu | (Russia) Yelena Kondakova | (United Kingdom) (United States) C. Michael Foale	Delivered Michael Foale for long-duration stay | Returned Jerry Linenger from long-duration stay
STS-86	26 September 1997	Atlantis		(United States) James Wetherbee | (United States) Michael Bloomfield | (Russia) Vladimir Titov | (United States) Scott Parazynski | (France) Jean-Loup Chrétien | (United States) Wendy Lawrence | (United States) David Wolf	Vladimir Titov became first Russian cosmomaut to use an EMU | Delivered David Wolf for long-duration stay | Returned Michael Foale from long-duration stay
STS-89	31 January 1998	Endeavour		(United States) Terrence Wilcutt | (United States) Joe Edwards | (United States) James F. Reilly | (United States) Michael Anderson | (United States) Bonnie Dunbar | (Russia) Salizhan Sharipov | (Australia) (United States) Andrew Thomas	Delivered Andrew Thomas for long-duration stay | Returned David Wolf from long-duration stay
STS-91	2 June 1998	Discovery		(United States) Charles Precourt | (United States) Dominic Pudwill Gorie | (Costa Rica) (United States) Franklin Chang Díaz | (United States) Wendy Lawrence | (United States) Janet Kavandi | (Russia) Valery Ryumin	Final Shuttle Mir mission | Returned Andrew Thomas from long-duration stay

== Controversy ==
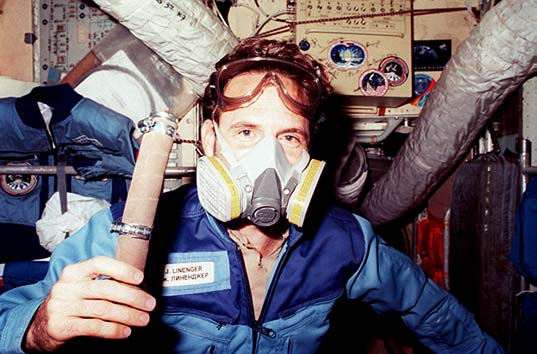
Astronaut Jerry Linenger wearing a respirator mask following the 1997 fire aboard Mir

=== Safety and scientific return ===
Criticism of the program was primarily concerned with the safety of the aging Mir, particularly following the fire aboard the station and collision with the Progress supply vessel in 1997.

The fire, caused by the malfunction of a backup solid-fuel oxygen generator (SFOG), burned for, according to various sources, between 90 seconds and 14 minutes, and produced large amounts of toxic smoke that filled the station for around 45 minutes. This forced the crew to don respirators, but some of the respirator masks initially worn were broken. Fire extinguishers mounted on the walls of the modules were immovable. The fire occurred during a crew rotation, and as such there were six men aboard the station rather than the usual three. Access to one of the docked Soyuz lifeboats was blocked, which would have prevented escape by half of the crew. A similar incident had occurred on an earlier Mir expedition, although in that case the SFOG burned for only a few seconds.

The near-miss and collision incidents presented further safety issues. Both were caused by failure of the same piece of equipment, the TORU manual docking system, which was undergoing tests at the time. The tests were called in order to gauge the performance of long-distance docking in order to enable the cash-strapped Russians to remove the expensive Kurs automatic docking system from the Progress ships.

In the wake of the collision NASA and the Russian Space Agency instigated numerous safety councils who were to determine the cause of the accident. As their investigations progressed, the two space agencies results began moving in different directions. NASA's results blamed the TORU docking system, as it required the astronaut or cosmonaut in charge to dock the Progress without the aide of any sort of telemetry or guidance. However, the Russian Space Agency's results blamed the accident on crew error, accusing their own cosmonaut of miscalculating the distance between the Progress and the space station. The Russian Space Agency's results were heavily criticized, even by their own cosmonaut Tsibliyev, on whom they were placing the blame. During his first press conference following his return to Earth, the cosmonaut expressed his anger and disapproval by declaring, "It has been a long tradition here in Russia to look for scapegoats."

The accidents also added to the increasingly vocal criticism of the aging station's reliability. Astronaut Blaine Hammond claimed that his safety concerns about Mir were ignored by NASA officials, and that records of safety meetings "disappeared from a locked vault". Mir was originally designed to fly for five years but eventually flew for three times that length of time. During Phase One and afterward, the station was showing her age—constant computer crashes, loss of power, uncontrolled tumbles through space and leaking pipes were an ever-present concern for crews. Various breakdowns of Mir's Elektron oxygen-generating system were also a concern. These breakdowns led crews to become increasingly reliant on the SFOG systems that caused the fire in 1997. SFOG systems continue to be a problem aboard the ISS.

Another issue of controversy was the scale of its actual scientific return, particularly following the loss of the Spektr science module. Astronauts, managers and various members of the press all complained that the benefits of the program were outweighed by the risks associated with it, especially considering the fact that most of the US science experiments had been contained within the holed module. As such, a large amount of American research was inaccessible, reducing the science that could be performed. The safety issues caused NASA to reconsider the future of the program at various times. The agency eventually decided to continue and came under fire from various areas of the press regarding that decision.

=== Attitudes ===
Attitudes of the Russian space program and NASA towards Phase One were also of concern to the astronauts involved. Because of Russia's financial issues, many workers at the TsUP felt that the mission hardware and continuation of Mir was more important than the lives of the cosmonauts aboard the station. As such the program was run very differently compared to American programs: cosmonauts had their days being planned for them to the minute, actions (such as docking) which would be performed manually by shuttle pilots were all carried out automatically, and cosmonauts had their pay docked if they made any errors during their flights. Americans learned aboard Skylab and earlier space missions that this level of control was not productive and had since made mission plans more flexible. The Russians, however, would not budge, and many felt that significant work time was lost because of this.

Following the two accidents in 1997, astronaut Jerry Linenger felt that the Russian authorities attempted a cover-up to downplay the significance of the incidents, fearing that the Americans would back out of the partnership. A large part of this "cover-up" was the seeming impression that the American astronauts were not in fact "partners" aboard the station, but were instead "guests". NASA staff did not find out for several hours about the fire and collision and found themselves kept out of decision-making processes. NASA became more involved when Russian mission controllers intended to place blame for the accident entirely on Vasily Tsibliyev. It was only after the application of significant pressure from NASA that this stance was changed.

At various times during the program, NASA managers and personnel found themselves limited in terms of resources and manpower, particularly as Phase Two geared up, and had a hard time getting anywhere with NASA administration. One particular area of contention was with crew assignments to missions. Many astronauts allege that the method of selection prevented the most skilled people from performing roles they were best-suited for.

=== Finances ===
Since the breakup of the Soviet Union a few years earlier, the Russian economy had been slowly collapsing and the budget for space exploration was reduced by around 80%. Before and after Phase One, a great deal of Russia's space finances came from flights of astronauts from Europe and other countries, with one Japanese TV station paying $9.5 million to have one of their reporters, Toyohiro Akiyama, flown aboard Mir. By the start of Phase One, cosmonauts regularly found their missions extended to save money on launchers, the six-yearly flights of the Progress had been reduced to three, and there was a distinct possibility of Mir being sold for around $500 million.

Critics argued that the $325 million contract NASA had with Russia was the only thing keeping the Russian space program alive, and only the Space Shuttle was keeping Mir aloft. NASA also had to pay hefty fees for training manuals and equipment used by astronauts training at Star City. Problems came to a head when ABC's Nightline revealed that there was a distinct possibility of embezzlement of American finances by the Russian authorities in order to build a suite of new cosmonaut houses in Moscow, or else that the building projects were being funded by the Russian Mafia. NASA administrator Goldin was invited onto Nightline to defend the homes but he refused to comment. NASA's office for external affairs was quoted as saying, "What Russia does with its own money is their business."

== See also ==
- List of heaviest spacecraft
- Skylab 4
