= Mir Docking Module =

Russian storage and crew access module for the Shuttle-Mir Program

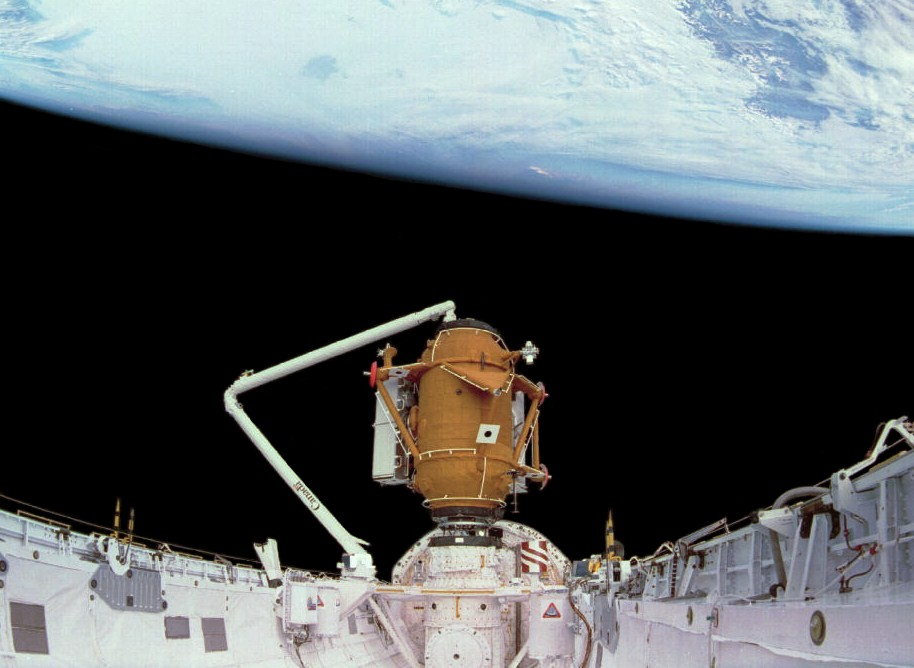
- The docking module seen in the payload bay of the Space Shuttle Atlantis on STS-74, prior to docking with Mir.

Module statistics
- Part of: Mir
- Launch date: 12 November 1995
- Launch vehicle: Space Shuttle Atlantis (STS-74)
- Docked: 15 November 1995
- Reentry: 23 March 2001
- Mass: 6,134 kg (13,523 lb)
- Length: 4.7 m (15 ft)
- Diameter: 2.2 m (7 ft 3 in)

Configuration
- The docking module shown isolated in its basic configuration. Various additional external fixtures are not shown.

The Mir Docking Module, formally known as the Stykovochnyy Otsek (SO; Russian: стыковочный отсек, lit. 'Docking compartment'; designation: 316GK), was the sixth module of the Russian space station Mir, launched in November 1995 aboard the Space Shuttle Atlantis. The module, built by Energia, was designed to help simplify space shuttle dockings to Mir during the Shuttle-Mir program, preventing the need for the periodic relocation of the Kristall module necessary for dockings prior to the compartment's arrival. The module was also used to transport two new photovoltaic arrays to the station, as a mounting point for external experiments, and as a storage module when not in use for dockings.

== Development ==
The final configuration of Mir, showing the docking module (brown) with a docked Space Shuttle.

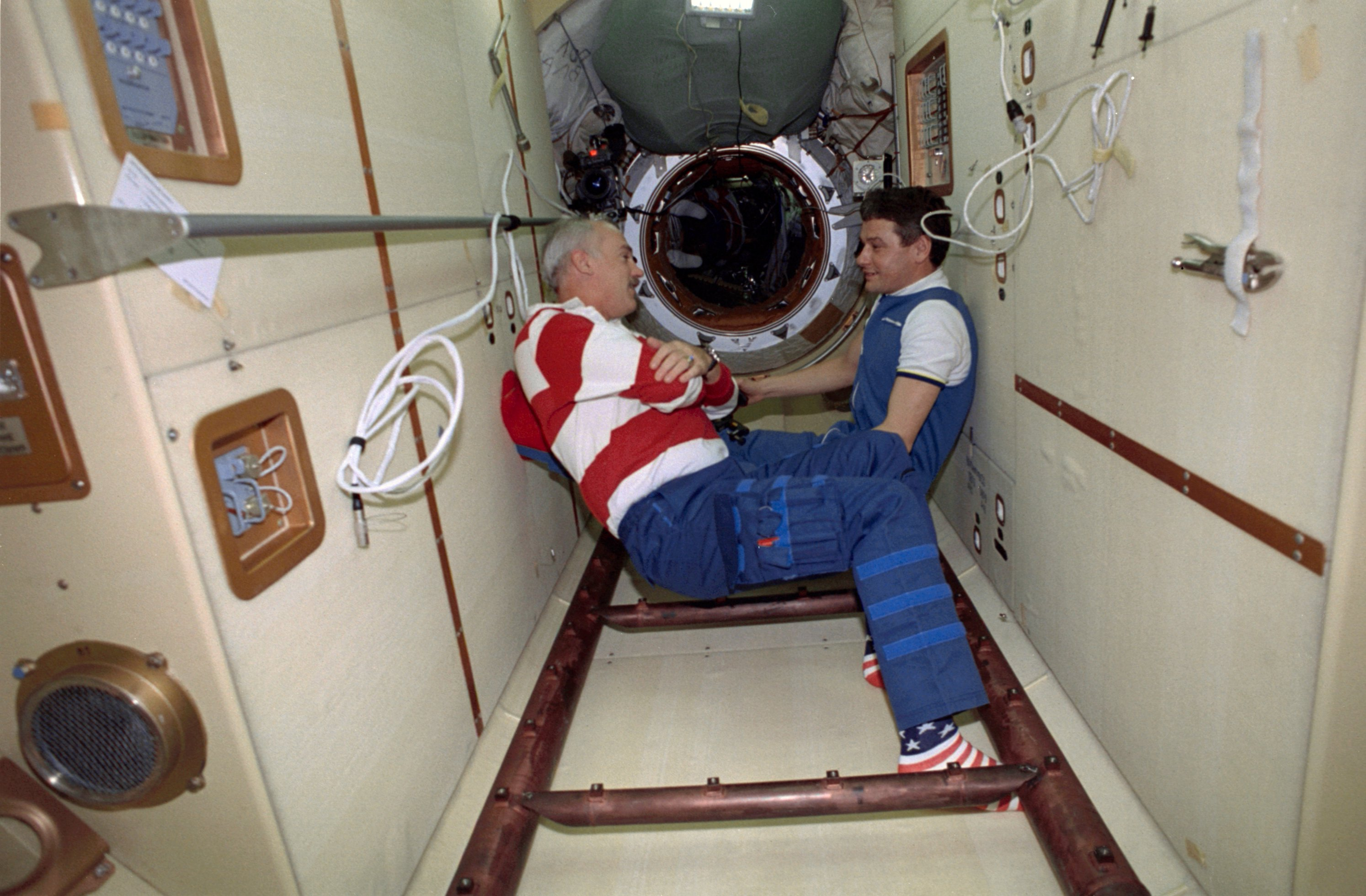
Interior of Docking Module

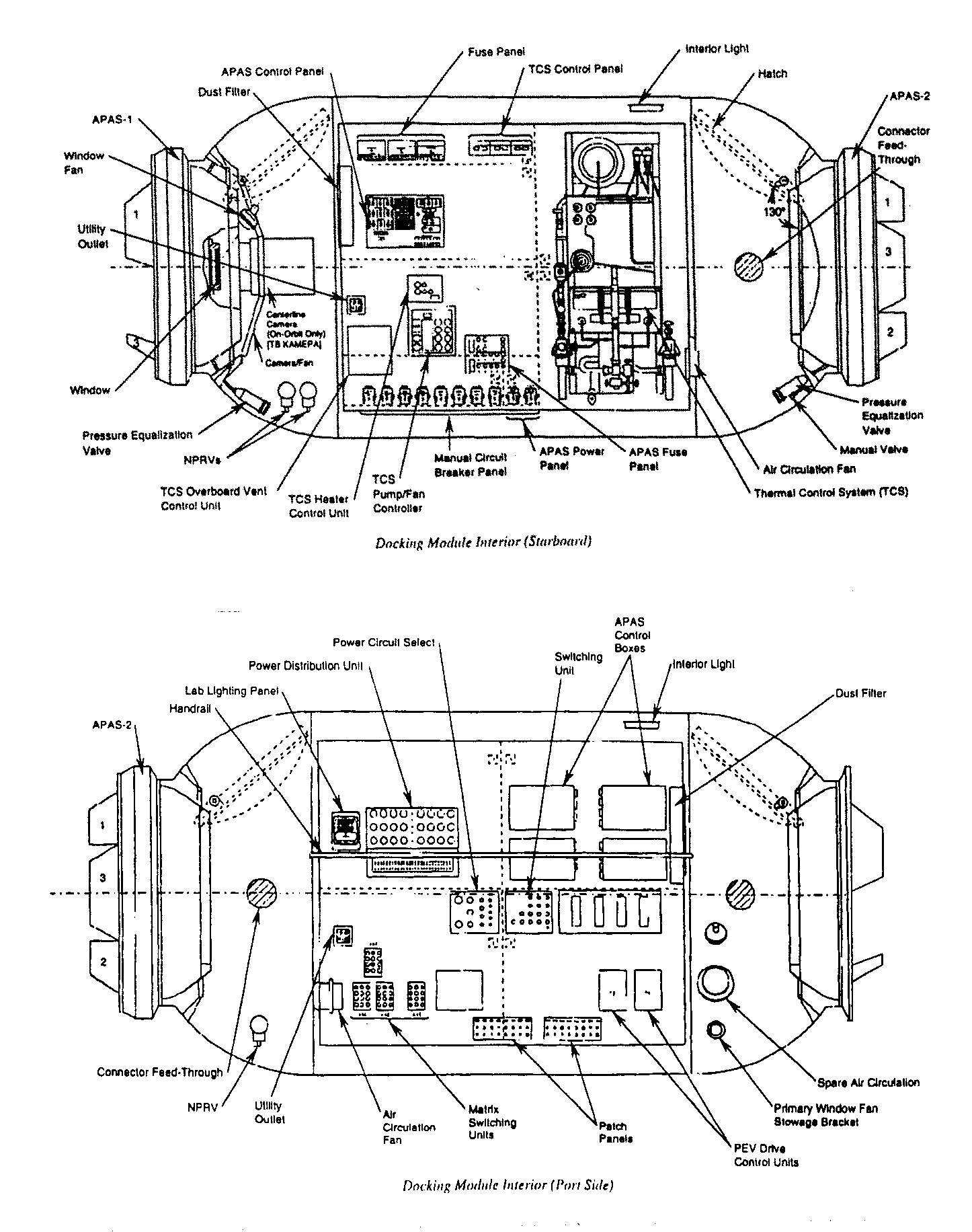
Docking Module cutaway

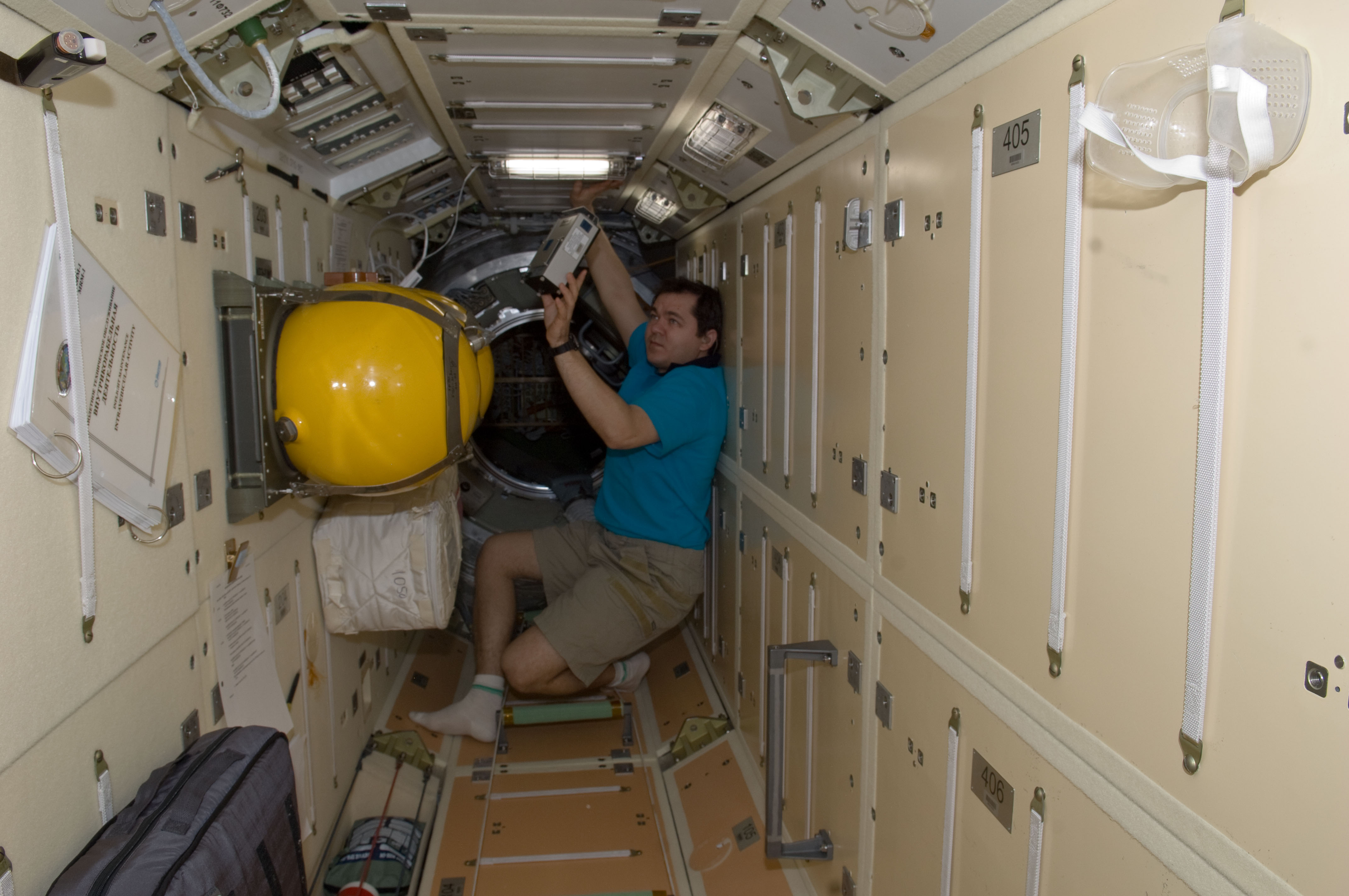
Interior view of Rassvet, compared to the Mir Docking Module above

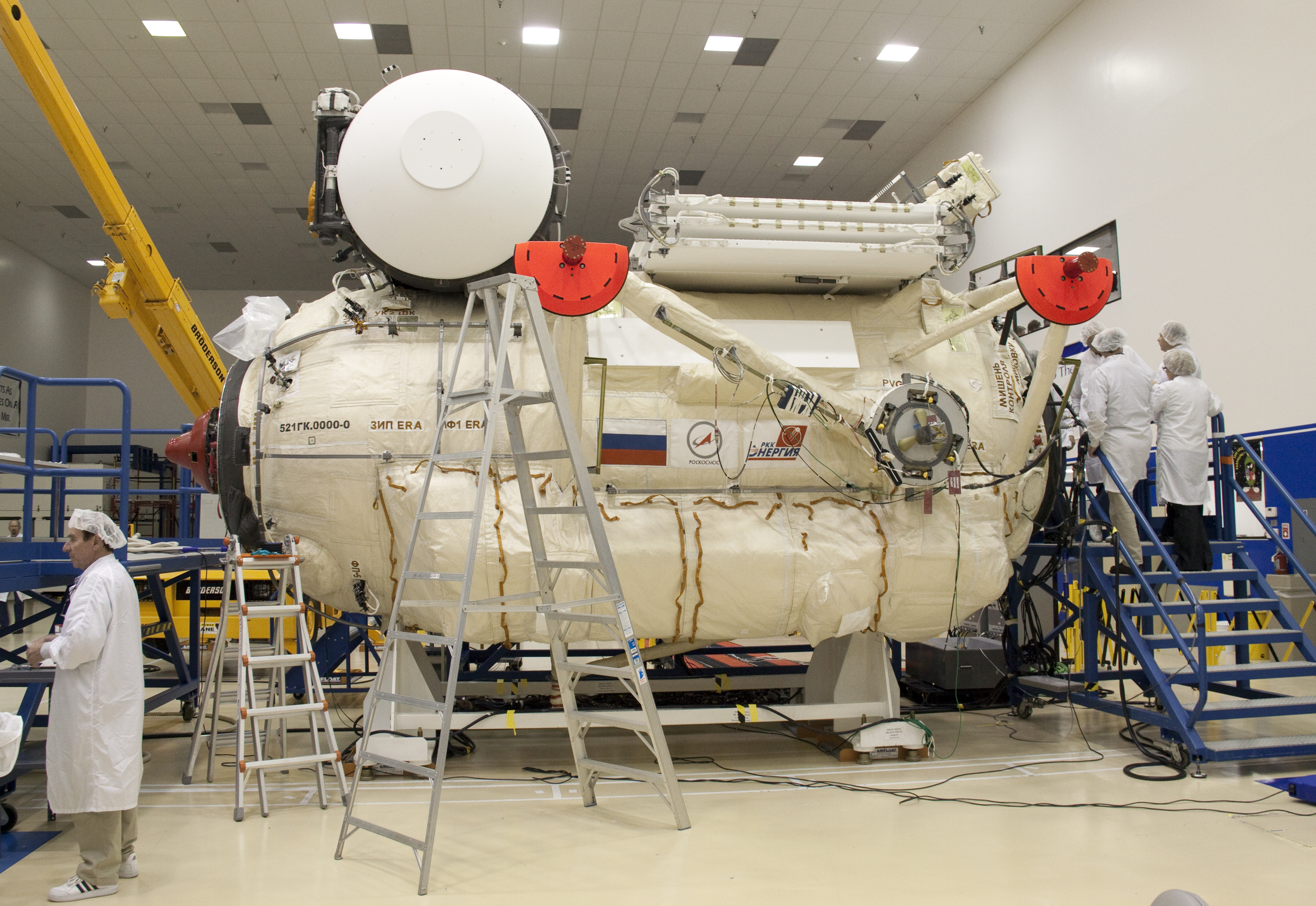
Rassvet is a mirror image of the Mir Docking Module

The docking module originated in the 1992 design version of the cancelled Mir-2 space station, which featured a combined docking compartment and airlock to facilitate docking missions during the Soviet Buran space shuttle programme (this module, SO-1, was eventually incorporated into the Russian Orbital Segment of the International Space Station as Pirs). When the Shuttle-Mir programme began, engineers realised that in order to enable US space shuttles to dock to Mir, the Kristall module would have to be relocated to the forward port of the core module and back to its own lateral port each time a shuttle docked, a process which was not only time consuming but would also be entirely reliant on Kristall's Lyappa arm, which, should it fail, would prevent any further shuttle missions to the station. Adding a small extension to Kristall, however, would provide the shuttles the clearance they needed to dock without necessitating the relocation of the module on each occasion, and it was decided to base the design of the new module loosely on that of the Mir-2 docking compartment.

Discussions on providing a docking module for the Shuttle-Mir programme began in May 1993 and approval was granted on 1 November, with the draft plan being developed by December. The module consisted of what were essentially two Soyuz TM-16 type Soyuz orbital modules cut in half, with a cylindrical central portion mounted in the center of the two halves which incorporated docking apparatus (the other two halves were not used). An APAS-89 docking port was mounted on each end. Mounting points were also provided for two boxes (containing new solar arrays) and other external experiments, and the module was provided with its own thermal control, television transmission, and telemetry systems. Rather than being covered in a newly-manufactured white thermal blanket, the module was flown with an unusual orange blanket, which was selected from pre-existing stock for financial reasons. Development of the simplified module was given priority over the more complex Mir-2 type SO-1, and the flight model, the first to make use of NASA's new Space Station Processing Facility, was delivered to Kennedy Space Center on 7 June 1995 alongside the new solar arrays which were to be launched with it.

The module was launched aboard the Space Shuttle Atlantis on 12 November 1995 on mission STS-74 and both the module and Atlantis docked to Mir on 15 November, leaving STS-71 as the only Shuttle-Mir docking mission requiring Kristall to be relocated.

The module resembles the pressure hull for the cancelled Science Power Platform intended for Mir-2 and the International Space Station, the test article for which was turned into the Rassvet Mini-Research Module 1 and launched in 2010 aboard Atlantis, on mission STS-132.

== Solar arrays and MEEP ==
In addition to simplifying space shuttle docking missions, Mir's docking module was also used as a carrier for two new photovoltaic arrays, mounted to the module in boxes, which were later deployed on Kvant-1 during spacewalks. The first, the Mir Cooperative Solar Array, was jointly designed by NASA and Russia in order to test designs for the future International Space Station. The array was 42 m^{2} in area, and provided 6.7 kW of power when installed on the station during expedition EO-21 in 1996. The array consisted of 42 US-built panels arranged in a 2.7 m (9 ft) wide and 18 m (59 ft) long array mounted to a Russian-built frame, and was instrumented to provide data for models being used to design the solar arrays for the ISS. The second array was the Russian-built MSB array, which had originally been intended to be launched as part of Priroda before the redesign of the module deleted it. It was installed on Kvant-1 during EVA 5 of EO-24, replacing the Kristall array which had previously been mounted there.

The module was also used as a mounting point for the Mir Environmental Effects Payload (MEEP), a set of four experiments intended to study the effects of space debris impacts and exposure to the space environment on a variety of materials. The materials used in the experiments were being considered for use on the ISS, and by exposing them at a similar orbital altitude to that flown by the station, the experiments provided an assessment of the performance of those materials in a similar space environment. MEEP also fulfilled the need to examine the occurrence and effects of man-made debris and natural micrometeoroids through capture and impact studies. The experiments were installed on the docking module during STS-76, and retrieved during STS-86.

== Docking missions ==
Orbiter	Mission	Date docked (UTC)	Date undocked (UTC)	Notes
Atlantis	STS-74	14 November 1995 07:17	18 November 1995 08:15:44	The module was docked to Atlantis's orbiter docking system by the orbiter's SRMS robotic arm on 14 November, then both Atlantis and the module docked to the station the next day.
Atlantis	STS-76	24 March 1996 02:34:05	29 March 1996 01:08:03	The crew of Atlantis installed the Mir Environmental Effects Payload (MEEP) on the exterior of the docking module.
Atlantis	STS-79	19 September 1996 03:13:18	24 September 1996 01:31:34	
Atlantis	STS-81	15 January 1997 03:54:49	20 January 1997 02:15:44	
Atlantis	STS-84	17 May 1997 02:33:20	22 May 1997 01:03:56	
Atlantis	STS-86	27 September 1997 19:58	3 October 1997 17:28:15	The crew of Atlantis retrieved the Mir Environmental Effects Payload (MEEP) from the exterior of the docking module.
Endeavour	STS-89	24 January 1998 20:14:15	29 January 1998 16:56	
Discovery	STS-91	4 June 1998 16:58	8 June 1998 16:01	

== See also ==
- Pirs (ISS module)
- Poisk (ISS module)
- Rassvet (ISS module)
