= Shuttle Amateur Radio Experiment =

NASA and ham radio enthusiast-sponsored experiment

The Shuttle Amateur Radio Experiment (SAREX), later called the Space Amateur Radio Experiment, was a program that promoted and supported the use of amateur ("ham") radio by astronauts in low Earth orbit aboard the United States Space Shuttle to communicate with other amateur radio stations around the world. It was superseded by the Amateur Radio on the International Space Station (ARISS) program. SAREX was sponsored by NASA, AMSAT (The Radio Amateur Satellite Corporation), and the ARRL (American Radio Relay League).

== History ==
Shortly after the launch of STS-9, On November 28, 1983 Owen Garriott (W5LFL) became the first amateur radio operator active in space. Garriott had already flown on Skylab 3, but did not operate radio equipment on that trip. On STS-9, he used a handheld 2-meter radio, provided by the Motorola Amateur Radio Club in Fort Lauderdale, to talk to his mother, senator Barry Goldwater (K7UGA), King Hussein of Jordan (JY1), and many others. Garriott made approximately 300 calls and convinced NASA that amateur radio was useful to get students involved in space. Thus began the Space Amateur Radio Experiment, also known as SAREX.

The second successful use of amateur radio in space was carried out by Anthony W. England (W0ORE) on Challenger flight STS-51F in 1985. He completed 130 contacts and sent 10 images via slow-scan television. In 1991, STS-37 became the first voyage to space on which the entire crew were licensed amateur radio operators.

After these flights, amateur radios were often taken on the shuttles. Missions STS-51F through STS-37 were known as SAREX missions. The remaining missions were branded SAREX II. When the program moved to the International Space Station it became known as Amateur Radio on the International Space Station, abbreviated as ARISS. Licensed hams were able to participate during their free time.

Shuttles that Participated and Licensed Astronauts

Mission	Year	Licensed Astronauts
STS-9	1983	Owen Garriott (W5LFL)
STS-51F	1985	Anthony W. England (WØORE)
STS-35	1990	Ron Parise (WA4SIR)
STS-37	1991	Kenneth D. Cameron (KB5AWP), Steven Nagel (N5RAW), Linda Godwin (N5RAX), Jay Apt (N5QWL), Jerry L. Ross (formerly KB5OHL)
STS-45	1992	Dave Leestma (N5WQC), Kathy Sullivan (N5YVV), Brian Duffy (N5WQW), Dirk Frimout (ON1AFD)
STS-47	1992	Jay Apt (N5QWL), Mamoru Mohri (7L2NJY)
STS-50	1992	Unknown
STS-55	1993	Jerry L. Ross (N5SCW)
STS-56	1993	Kenneth D. Cameron (KB5AWP), Mike Foale (KB5UAC), Ellen Ochoa (KB5TZZ), Kenneth Cockrell (KB5UAH)
STS-57	1993	Brian Duffy (N5WQW), Janice Voss (KC5BTK)
STS-58	1993	Richard Searfoss (KC5CKM), William S. McArthur Jr. (KC5ACR), Martin J. Fettman (KC5AXA)
STS-59	1994	Linda Godwin (N5RAX), Jay Apt (N4QWL)
STS-60	1994	Charles Bolden (formerly KE4IQB), Ronald Sega (KC5ETH), Sergei Krikalev (U5MIR)
STS-64	1994	Richard N. Richards (KB5SIW), Blaine Hammond Jr. (KC5HBS), Jerry Linenger (KC5HBR)
STS-65	1994	Donald A. Thomas (KC5FVF), Robert D. Cabana (KC5HBV)
STS-67	1995	Stephen S. Oswald (KB5YSR), William G. Gregory (KC5MGA), Tamara E. Jernigan (KC5MGF), Wendy B. Lawrence (KC5KII), Samuel T. Durrance (N3TQA)
STS-70	1995	Donald A. Thomas (KC5FVF)
STS-71	1995	Richard Searfoss (KC5CKM), Linda Godwin (N5RAX), Ronald Sega (KC4ETH), Shannon Lucid (R0MIR)
STS-74	1995	Kenneth D. Cameron (KB5AWP), Jerry L. Ross (N5SCW), William S. McArthur (KC5ACR), Chris Hadfield (VA3OOG), James Halsell (KC5RNI)
STS-76	1996	Richard Searfoss (KC5CKM), Linda Godwin (N5RAX), Ronald Sega (KC5ETH), Shannon Lucid (R0MIR)
STS-78	1996	Charles Brady (N4BQW), Susan Helms (KC7NHZ)
STS-79	1996	Jay Apt (N5QWL), John Blaha (KC5TZQ), Carl Walz (KC5TIE)
STS-83	1997	James Halsell (KC5RNI), Janice Voss (KC5BTK), Donald A. Thomas (KC5FVF)
STS-94	1998	James Halsell (KC5RNI), Janice Voss (KC5BTK), Donald A. Thomas (KC5FVF)
STS-93	1999	Eileen Collins (KD5EDS), Cady Coleman (KC5ZTH), Michel Tognini (KD5EJZ)

== Educational uses ==
Most amateur radio operators used SAREX to speak with licensed astronauts during their down time. SAREX, however, has been very educational for young students from kindergarten to fifth grade involved in a program similar to young astronauts, in which elementary school children learn about astronauts' daily activities and what it is like in space. Students also have had the opportunity to communicate via video when the shuttles have had suitable equipment. Teachers have found out about how to link their classes with the SAREX program through the Amateur Radio in Space Guide distributed by NASA.

== Licensing ==
In the United States an amateur operator license is needed before operating an amateur station. The license can be obtained from the U.S. Federal Communications Commission's (FCC) Amateur Radio Service. No special SAREX license was required for operation, but certain regulations come into play for space communications.
