= SAREX =

SAREX has several meanings:

- a Search and Rescue Exercise (SAREX) of the US Military, see U.S. Air Force Auxiliary
- Shuttle Amateur Radio Experiment
