= STS-37 =

1991 American crewed spaceflight to deploy the Compton Gamma Ray Observatory

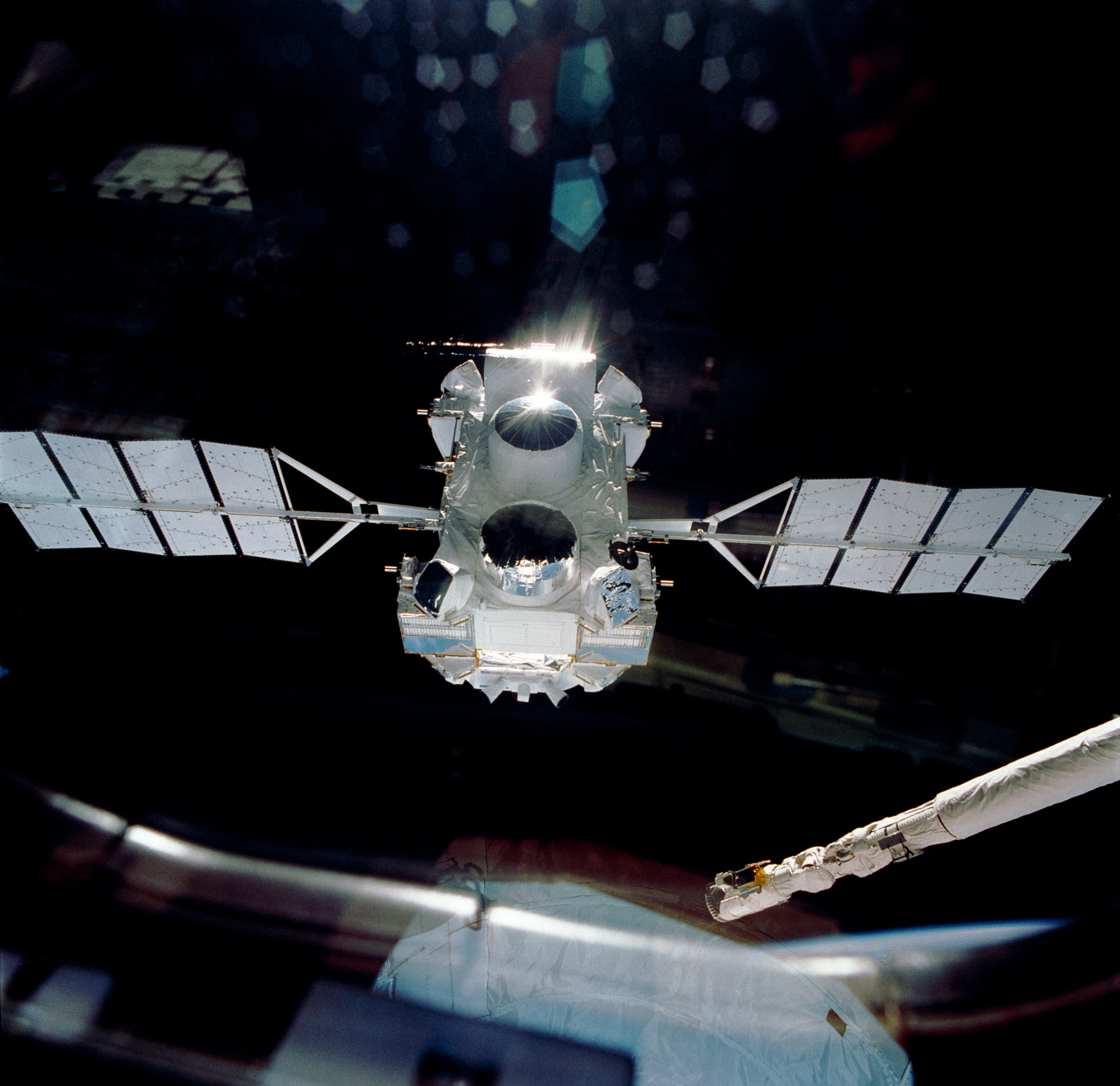
- The Compton Gamma Ray Observatory after deployment, photographed from Atlantis's flight deck.
- Names: Space Transportation System-37
- Mission type: Compton Gamma Ray Observatory deployment
- Operator: NASA
- COSPAR ID: 1991-027A
- SATCAT no.: 21224
- Mission duration: 5 days, 23 hours, 32 minutes, 44 seconds
- Distance travelled: 2,487,075 mi (4,002,559 km)
- Orbits completed: 93

Spacecraft properties
- Spacecraft: Space Shuttle Atlantis
- Launch mass: 116,040 kg (255,820 lb)
- Landing mass: 86,227 kg (190,098 lb)
- Payload mass: 17,204 kg (37,928 lb)

Crew
- Crew size: 5
- Members: Steven R. Nagel; Kenneth D. Cameron; Linda M. Godwin; Jerry L. Ross; Jerome Apt
- EVAs: 2
- EVA duration: 10 hours, 29 minutes; 1st EVA: 4 hours, 32 minutes; 2nd EVA: 5 hours, 57 minutes

Start of mission
- Launch date: April 5, 1991, 14:22:45 UTC (9:22:45 am EST)
- Launch site: Kennedy, LC-39B
- Contractor: Rockwell International

End of mission
- Landing date: April 11, 1991, 13:55:29 UTC (6:55:29 am PDT)
- Landing site: Edwards, Runway 33

Orbital parameters
- Reference system: Geocentric orbit
- Regime: Low Earth orbit
- Perigee altitude: 450 km (280 mi)
- Apogee altitude: 462 km (287 mi)
- Inclination: 28.45°
- Period: 93.70 minutes

Instruments
- Air Force Maui Optical Site (AMOS); Ascent Particle Monitor (APM); Bioserve/Instrumentation Technology Associates Materials Dispersion Apparatus (BIMDA); Crew and Equipment Translation Aid (CETA); Protein Crystal Growth (PCG); Radiation Monitoring Equipment (RME Ill); Shuttle Amateur Radio Experiment (SAREX II)
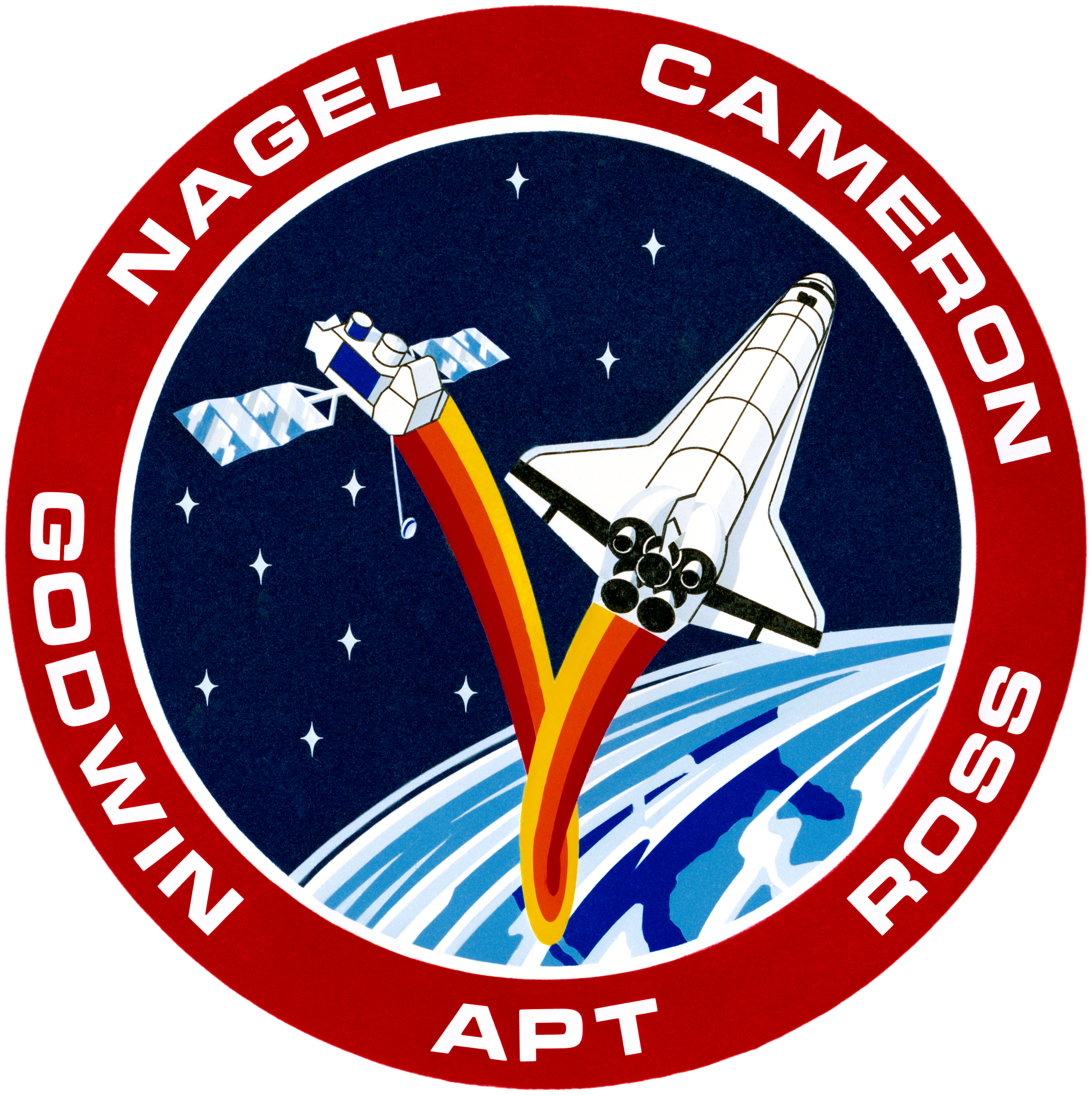
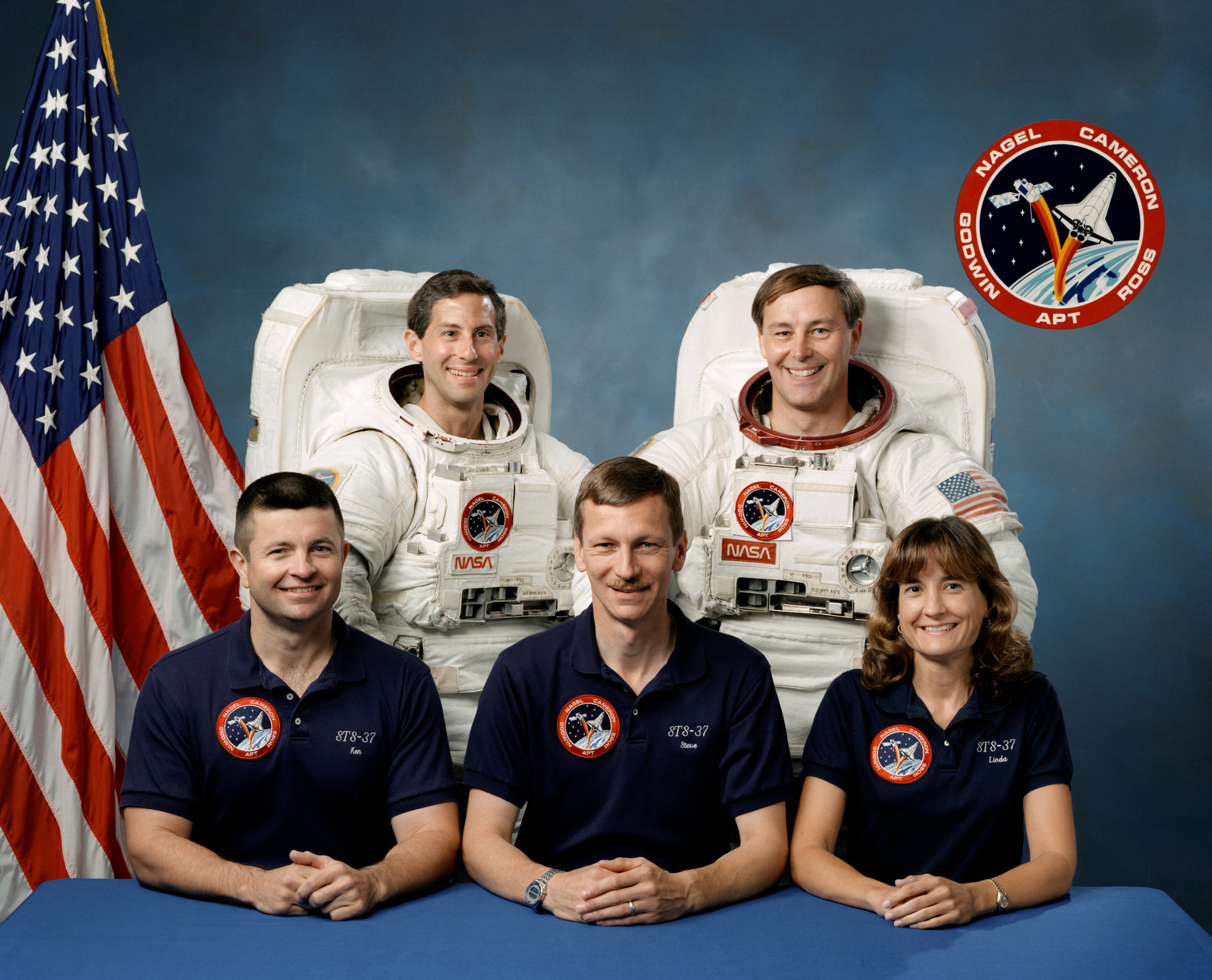
- STS-37 mission patch Standing in EVA suits: Apt and Ross; Seated: Cameron, Nagel and Godwin Space Shuttle program

STS-37, the thirty-ninth NASA Space Shuttle mission and the eighth flight of the Space Shuttle Atlantis, was a six-day mission with the primary objective of launching the Compton Gamma Ray Observatory (CGRO), the second of the Great Observatories program which included the visible-spectrum Hubble Space Telescope (HST), the Chandra X-ray Observatory (CXO) and the infrared Spitzer Space Telescope. The mission also featured two spacewalks, the first since 1985.

== Crew ==
Position	Astronaut
Commander	Steven R. Nagel; Third spaceflight
Pilot	Kenneth D. Cameron; First spaceflight
Mission Specialist 1	Linda M. Godwin; First spaceflight
Mission Specialist 2 Flight Engineer	Jerry L. Ross; Third spaceflight
Mission Specialist 3	Jerome Apt; First spaceflight

=== Spacewalks ===
EVA 1

- Personnel: Apt and Ross
- Date: April 7, 1991 (≈18:00–22:00 UTC)
- Duration: 4 hours, 32 minutes

EVA 2

- Personnel: Apt and Ross
- Date: April 8, 1991 (14:51–20:38 UTC)
- Duration: 5 hours, 57 minutes

=== Crew seat assignments ===
Seat	Launch	Landing	Seats 1–4 are on the flight deck. Seats 5–7 are on the mid-deck.
1	Nagel		Seats 1–4 are on the flight deck. Seats 5–7 are on the mid-deck.
2	Cameron		Seats 1–4 are on the flight deck. Seats 5–7 are on the mid-deck.
3	Apt	Godwin	Seats 1–4 are on the flight deck. Seats 5–7 are on the mid-deck.
4	Ross		Seats 1–4 are on the flight deck. Seats 5–7 are on the mid-deck.
5	Godwin	Apt	Seats 1–4 are on the flight deck. Seats 5–7 are on the mid-deck.
6	Unused		Seats 1–4 are on the flight deck. Seats 5–7 are on the mid-deck.
7	Unused		Seats 1–4 are on the flight deck. Seats 5–7 are on the mid-deck.

== Preparations and launch ==
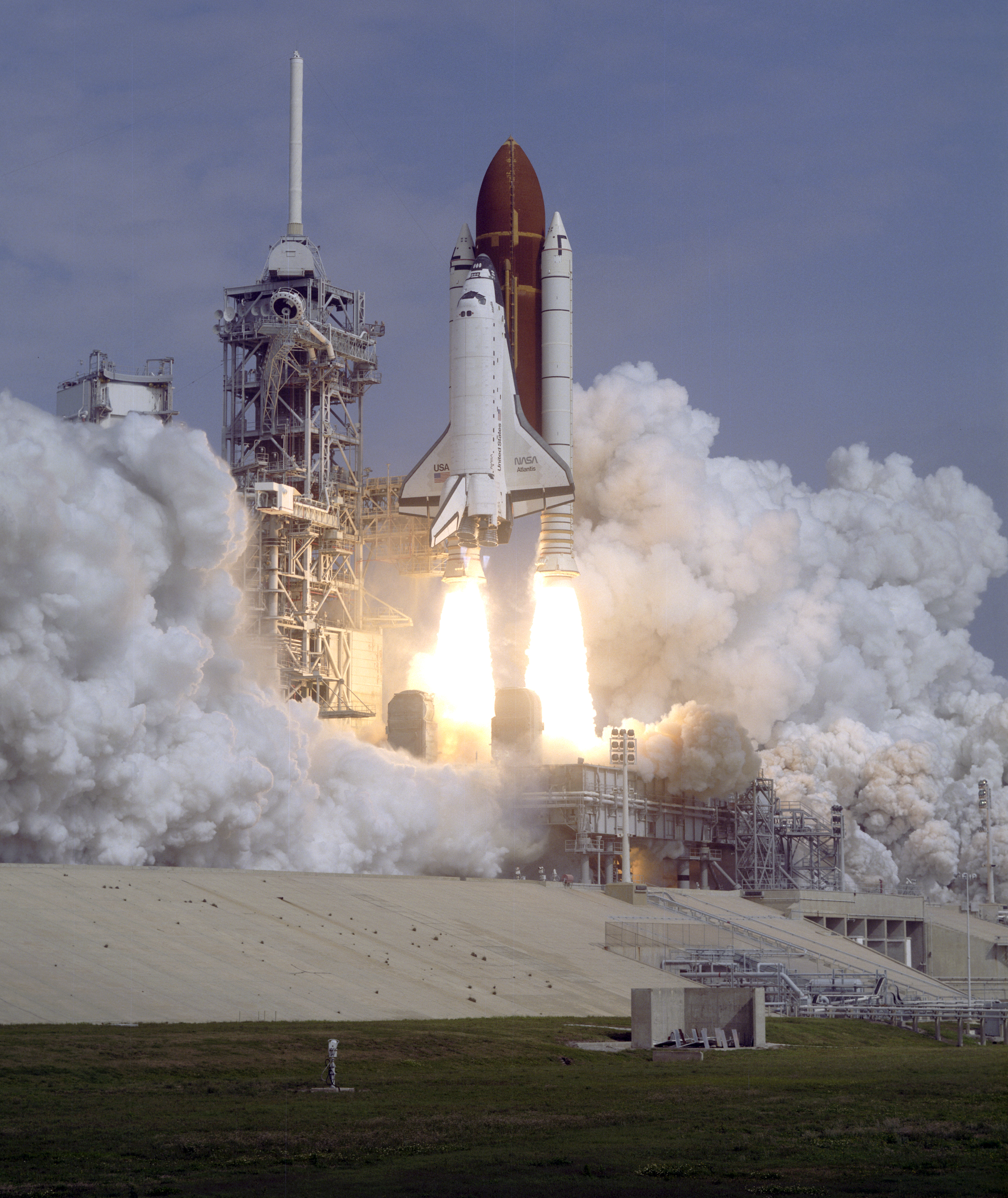
Launch of Atlantis on STS-37

The STS-37 mission was successfully launched from launch pad 39B at 9:22:44 a.m. EST on April 5, 1991, from the Kennedy Space Center in Florida. Resumption of the countdown after the T−9-minute hold was delayed about 4 minutes 45 seconds because of two possible weather-condition violations of the launch commit criteria (LCC). The first concerned the cloud ceiling being 150 m (490 ft) less than the minimum of 2,400 m (7,900 ft) for a return-to-launch-site (RTLS) abort, and the second concerned the possible weather-condition (wind) effects on blast propagation. Both conditions were found acceptable and the launch countdown proceeded to a satisfactory launch to an inclination of 28.45°. Launch weight: 116,040 kg (255,820 lb).

== Compton Gamma Ray Observatory ==
The primary payload, the Compton Gamma Ray Observatory (CGRO), was deployed on flight day 3. CGRO's high-gain antenna failed to deploy on command; it was finally freed and manually deployed by Ross and Apt during an unscheduled contingency spacewalk, the first since April 1985. The following day, the two astronauts performed the first scheduled spacewalk since November 1985 to test means for astronauts to move themselves and equipment about while maintaining the then-planned Space Station Freedom. CGRO science instruments were Burst and Transient Source Experiment (BATSE), imaging Compton Telescope (COMPTEL), Energetic Gamma Ray Experiment Telescope (EGRET) and Oriented Scintillation Spectrometer Experiment (OSSE). CGRO was the second of NASA's four Great Observatories. The Hubble Space Telescope, deployed during Mission STS-31 in April 1990, was the first. CGRO was launched on a two-year mission to search for the high-energy celestial gamma ray emissions, which cannot penetrate Earth's atmosphere. At about 16,000 kg (35,000 lb), CGRO was the heaviest satellite to be deployed into low Earth orbit from the Shuttle. It was also designed to be the first satellite that could be refueled in orbit by Shuttle crews. Five months after deployment, NASA renamed the satellite the Arthur Holly Compton Gamma Ray Observatory, or Compton Observatory, after the Nobel Prize-winning physicist who did important work in gamma-ray astronomy.

== Spacewalks ==
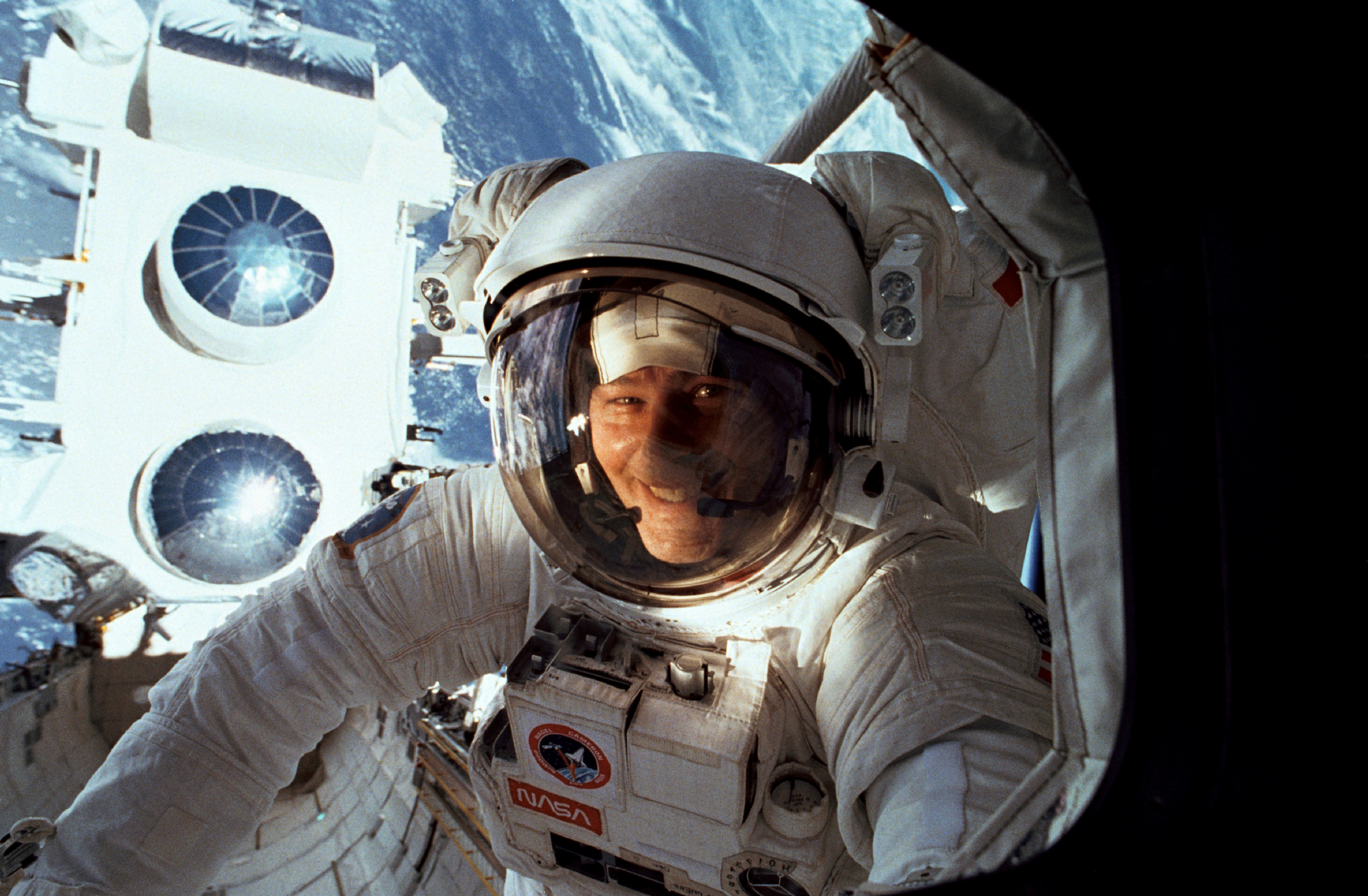
Ross during the first EVA; CGRO in the background

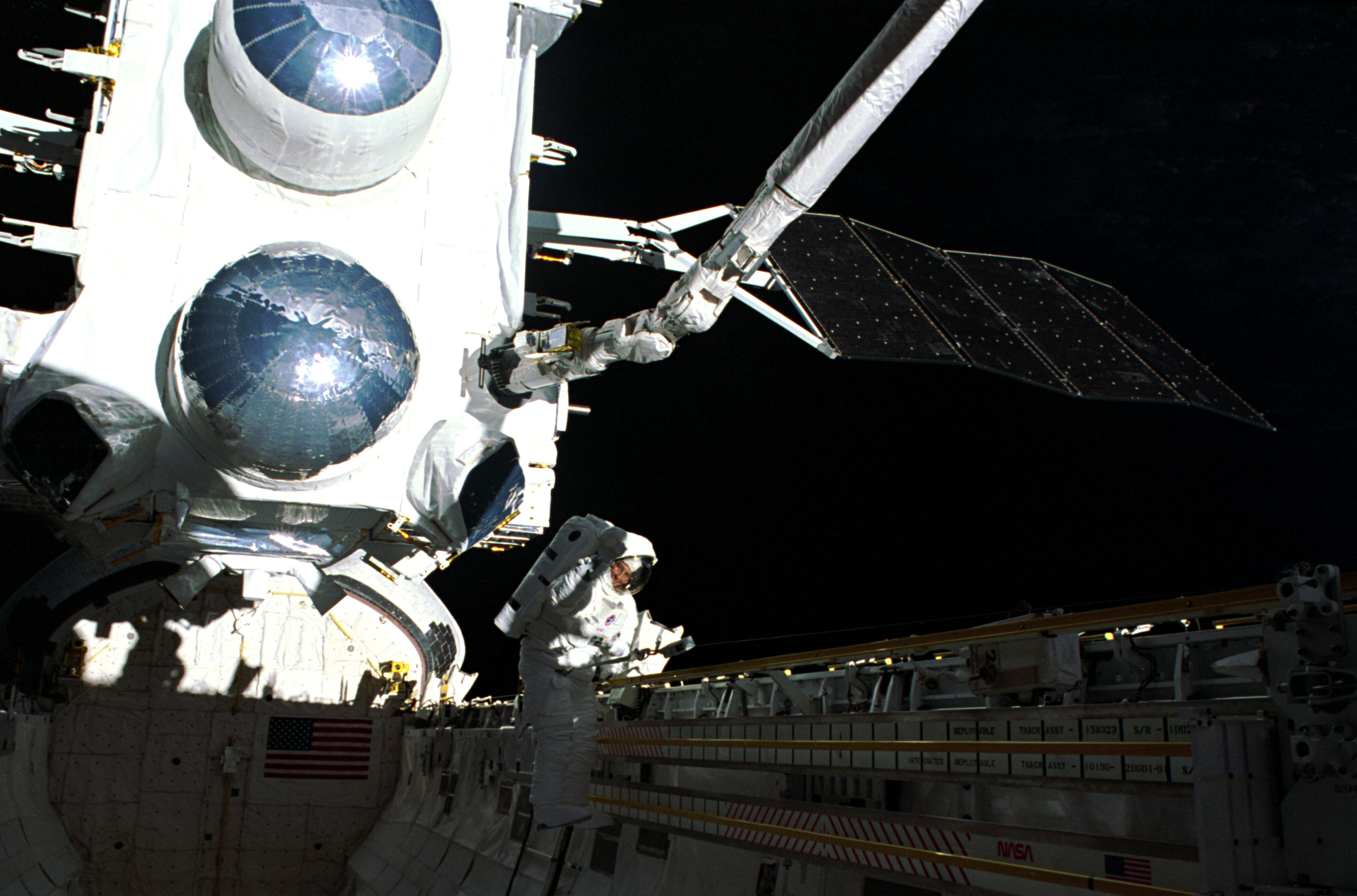
Jay Apt on the first EVA with CGRO

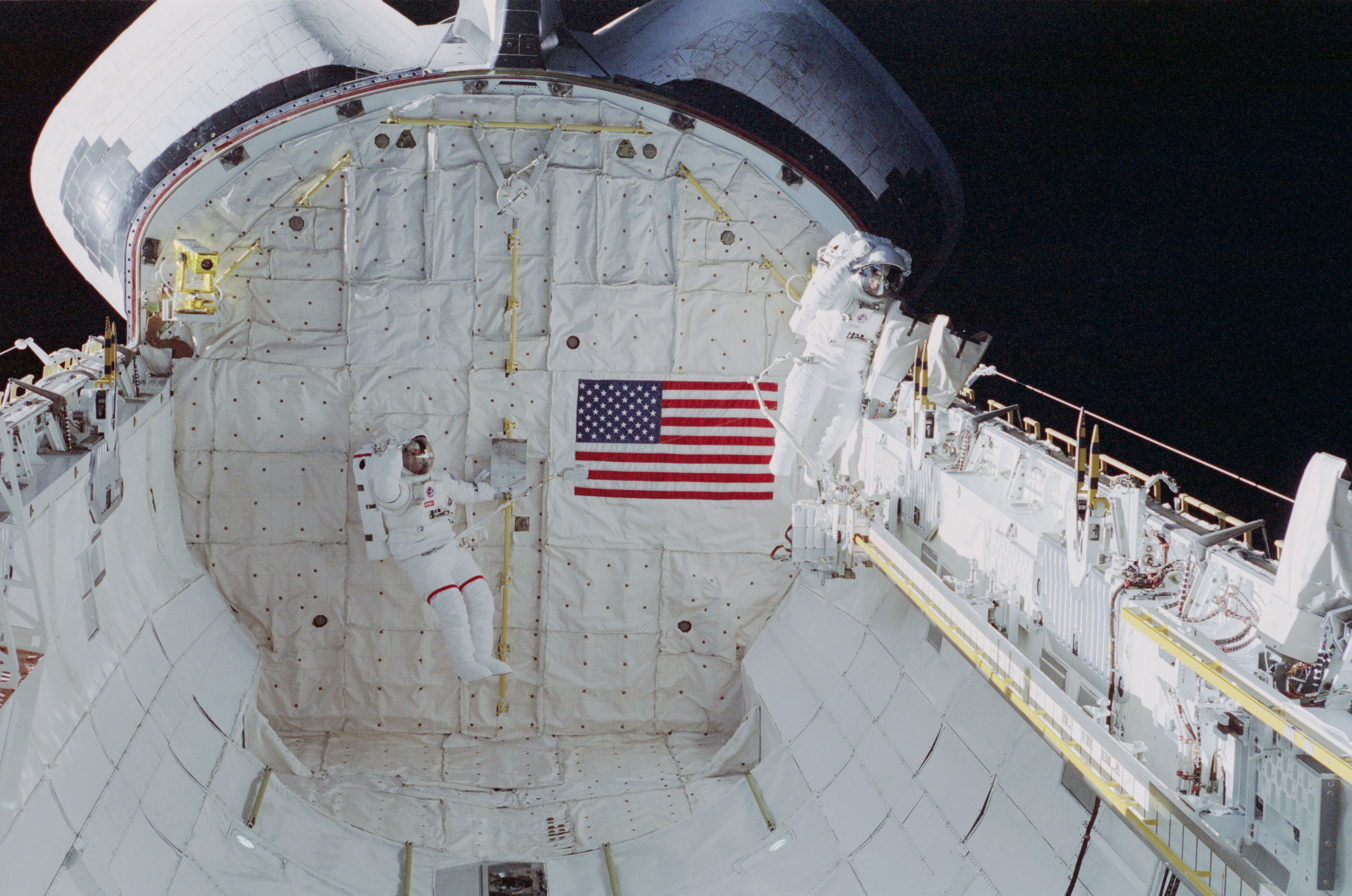
Ross and Apt on the second EVA of STS-37, April 8, 1991

The first U.S. extravehicular activity (EVA) or spacewalk since 1985 was performed by Mission Specialists Ross and Apt after six failed attempts to deploy the satellite's high-gain antenna. Repeated commands by ground controllers at the Payload Operations Control Center, Goddard Space Flight Center, Greenbelt, Maryland, and maneuvering of Atlantis and its Remote Manipulator System (Canadarm) robot arm, as well as CGRO's antenna dish, were to no avail in dislodging the boom. Ross and Apt were prepared for such a contingency, and Ross freed the antenna boom within 17 minutes after beginning the spacewalk. It was the first unscheduled contingency EVA since STS-51-D in April 1985. Deployment occurred about 18:35 EST, approximately 4 1/2 hours after it was scheduled.

The following day, on April 8, 1991, Ross and Apt made the first scheduled EVA since Mission STS-61-B in November 1985. The spacewalk was to test methods of moving crew members and equipment around the future Space Station Freedom. One of the experiments was to evaluate manual, mechanical and electrical power methods of moving carts around the outside of large structures in space. Although all three methods worked, the astronauts reported that propelling the cart manually or hand-over-hand worked best. With both EVAs, Ross and Apt logged 10 hours and 29 minutes walking in space during STS-37. Crew members also reported success with secondary experiments.

During the second EVA, a stainless steel palm restraint bar punctured the pressure bladder of Apt's right glove. However, the astronaut's hand and silk comfort glove partially sealed the hole, resulting in no detectable depressurization. In fact, the puncture was not noticed until postflight examination.

== Additional payloads and experiments ==
Secondary payloads included Crew and Equipment Translation Aid (CETA), which involved scheduled six-hour spacewalk by astronauts Ross and Apt (see above); Ascent Particle Monitor (APM); Shuttle Amateur Radio Experiment (SAREX); Protein Crystal Growth (PCG); Bioserve/Instrumentation Technology Associates Materials Dispersion Apparatus (BIMDA); Radiation Monitoring Equipment (RME Ill); and Air Force Maui Optical Site (AMOS) experiment. Among the other payloads flown was the first flight of the Bioserve/Instrumentation Technology Associates Materials Dispersion Apparatus (BIMDA) to explore the commercial potential of experiments in the biomedical, manufacturing processes and fluid sciences fields, and the Protein Crystal Growth experiment, which has flown eight times before in various forms.

Astronaut Pilot Kenneth D. Cameron was the primary operator of the Shuttle Amateur Radio Experiment (SAREX). It was the first time all five crew members participated as amateur radio operators. This SAREX mission was the first time that the astronauts received fast scan amateur television video from the ham radio club station (W5RRR) at Johnson Space Center (JSC) and three other uplinks. Videos uplinked included footage of the launch and a greeting from Jay Leno.

During the spaceflight, the crew was additionally able to photograph the Kuwaiti oil fires on April 7, 1991, as the Gulf War was ongoing during the spaceflight.

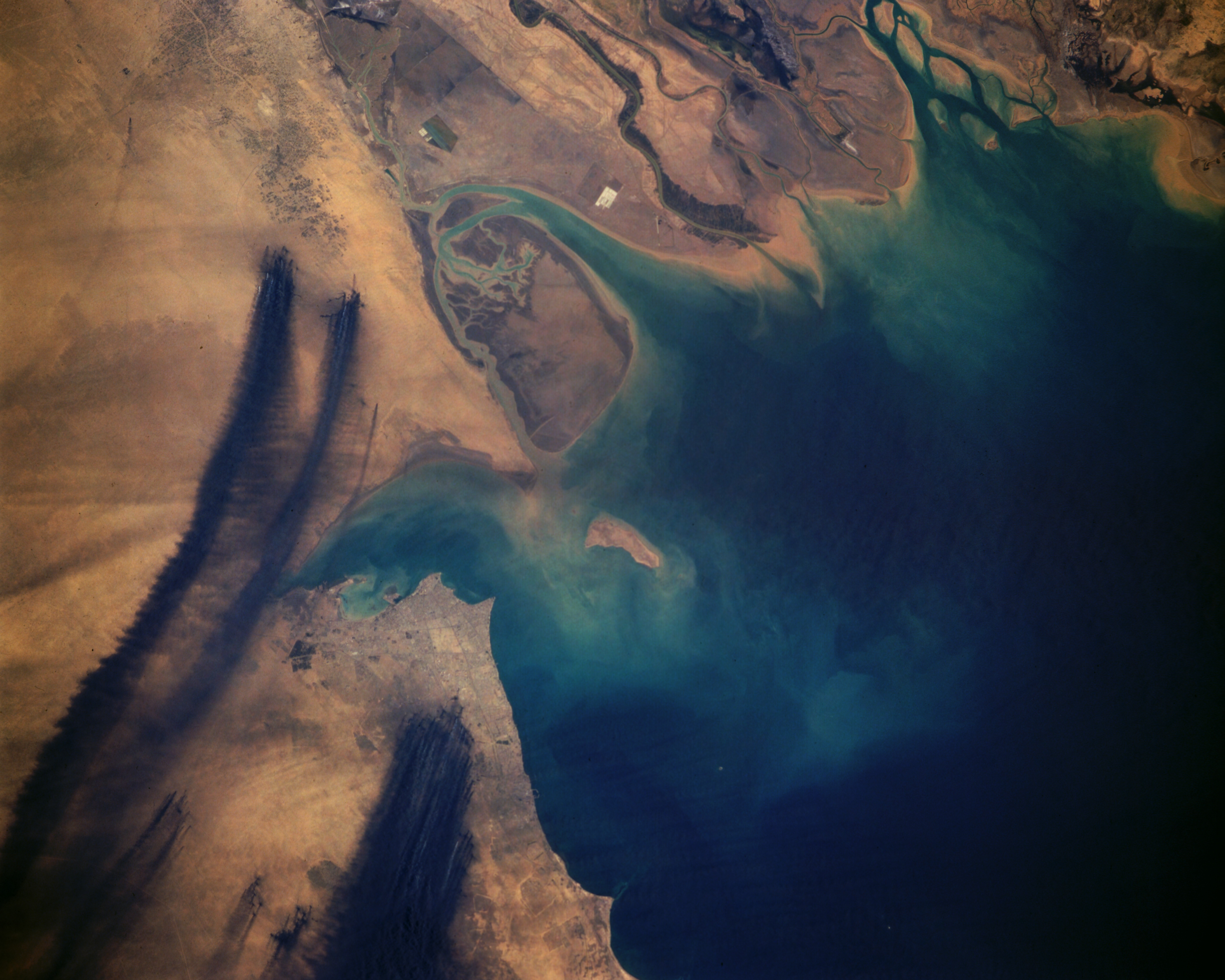
Smoke plumes from a few of the Kuwaiti Oil Fires on April 7, 1991, as seen during STS-37.

== Landing ==
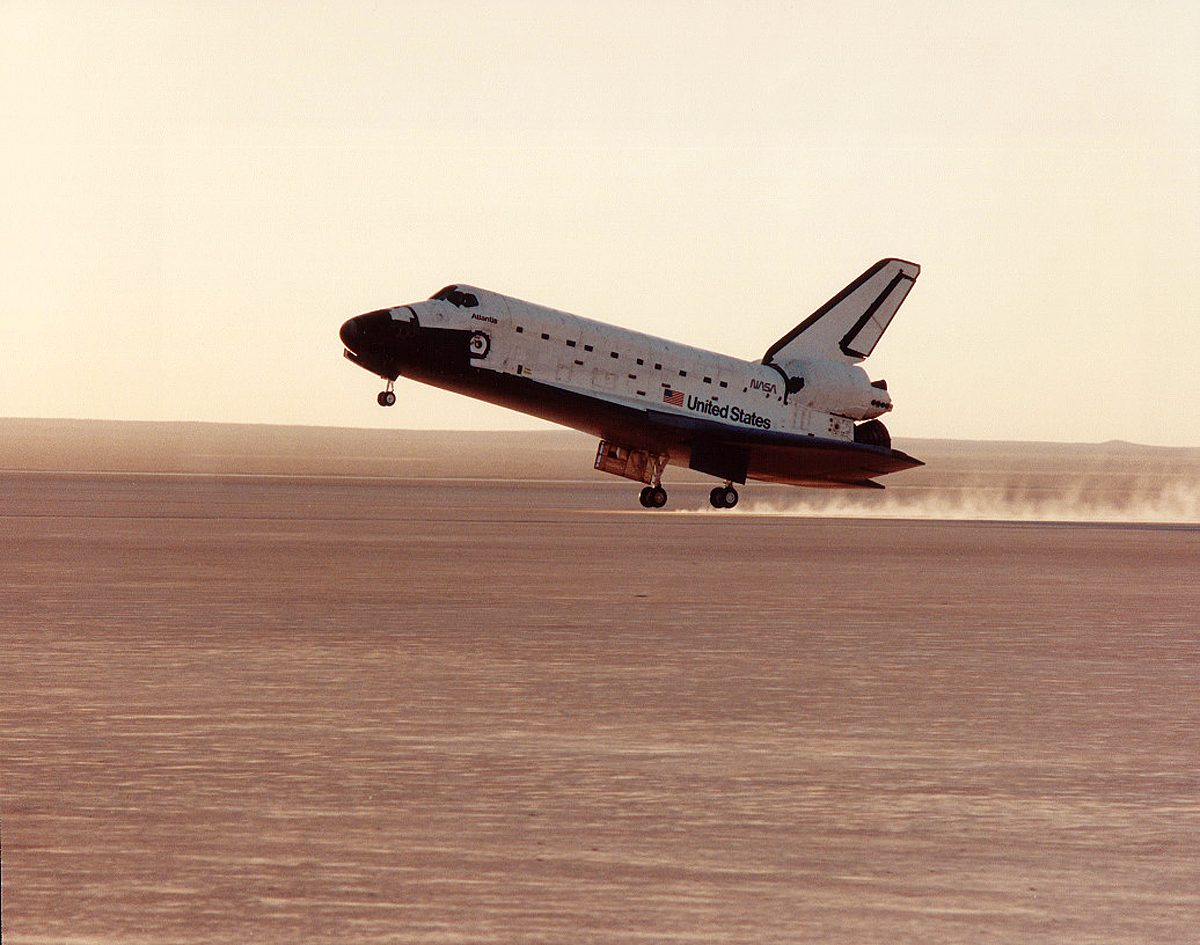
Atlantis touches down at Edwards Air Force Base.

On April 11, 1991, at 06:55:29 PDT, Atlantis landed on runway 33 at Edwards Air Force Base, California. The rollout distance was 1,940 m (6,360 ft), and the rollout time was 56 seconds. The landing was originally scheduled for April 10, 1991, but was delayed one day by weather conditions at Edwards and Kennedy Space Center (KSC). The orbiter returned to KSC on April 18, 1991. The landing weight was 86,227 kg (190,098 lb).

An incorrect call on winds aloft caused Atlantis to land 623 feet (190 metres) short of the lakebed runway's threshold marking. This did not present a problem, since the orbiter landed on the dry lakebed of Edwards, and was not obvious to most viewers. Had the landing been attempted at the Kennedy Space Center, the result would have been a touchdown on the paved underrun preceding the runway and would have been much more obvious. The landing speed was 168 knots equivalent airspeed (KEAS), 13 knots faster than the slowest landing of the Shuttle program, STS-28's 155 KEAS.

== Mission insignia ==
The three stars on the top and seven stars on the bottom of the insignia symbolize the flight's numerical designation in the Space Transportation System's mission sequence. The stars also represented the Amateur Radio term "73" or "Best regards", consistent with the fact that the entire crew had become licensed and operated the SAREX-II experiment while on orbit.

== Wake-up calls ==
NASA began a tradition of playing music to astronauts during the Project Gemini, and first used music to wake up a flight crew during Apollo 15. Each track is specially chosen, often by the astronauts' families, and usually has a special meaning to an individual member of the crew, or is applicable to their daily activities.

Day	Song	Artist/Composer	Played for
Day 2	Music by Marching Illini Band	University of Illinois	Steven R. Nagel
Day 3	"The Marine Corp Hymn"	U. S. Naval Academy band	Kenneth D. Cameron
Day 4	"Hail Purdue"	Purdue University Band	Jerry L. Ross
Day 5	"Ten Thousand Men of Harvard"	Harvard University Glee Club	Jerome "Jay" Apt
Day 6	"La Bamba"	Brass Rhythm and Reeds	Linda M. Godwin
Day 7	Magnum, P.I. theme with a greeting from Tom Selleck		Linda M. Godwin, "a big Selleck fan"

== See also ==
- List of human spaceflights
- List of Space Shuttle missions
- Outline of space science
- Space Shuttle
