= Amateur Radio on the International Space Station =

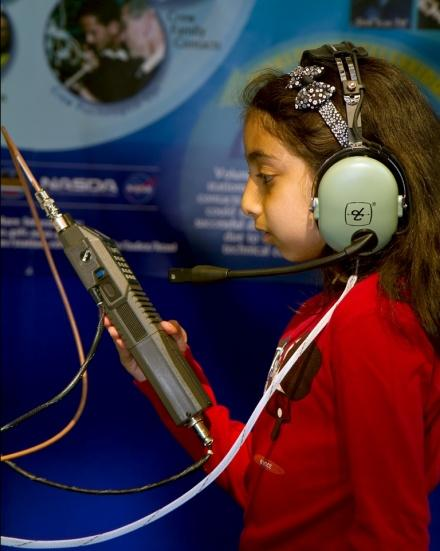
A student speaks to crew on the International Space Station using Amateur Radio equipment, provided free by volunteers of the ARISS program.

Astronaut Doug Wheelock operating ham radio from the ISS

Amateur Radio on the International Space Station (ARISS) is a program that facilitates radio communications between licensed amateur radio operators and crew members aboard the International Space Station using the amateur-satellite service. The primary goal of ARISS is "to promote exploration of science, technology, engineering, and mathematics topics" and inspire individuals to pursue careers in STEM.

ARISS was established in 1996. ARISS was once managed by an international consortium of amateur radio organizations and space agencies including NASA, Russia's space agency Roscosmos, Canadian Space Agency (CSA), Japan Aeronautics Exploration Space Agency (JAXA), and European Space Agency (ESA). They became independent in May 2020, becoming a 501.c.3 for their US affiliate, but still work closely with all the originating groups.

ARISS evolved from the Shuttle Amateur Radio Experiment (SAREX).

Students and amateur radio operators all over the world are able to speak directly to astronauts and cosmonauts via handheld, mobile, or home radio stations. Low power radios and small antennas can be used to establish communications. It is also possible to send digital data to the ISS via laptop computers, similar to an email communication, using radio frequencies instead of telephone or cable connections.

On November 12, 2000 the first amateur radio contacts were made from the International Space Station during Expedition 1. Sometime between 06:30 and 10:10 UTC Sergei Krikalev (callsign U5MIR) contacted the ARISS team in Russia. At 10:55 UTC Kiralev and William Shepherd (callsign KF5GSL) operating as NA1SS contacted the amateur radio club at NASA Goddard Spaceflight Center. A few minutes later they would talk to the Johnson Space Center club, W5RRR. The team noted in the mission log, "Comm quality of the VHF circuit was excellent. Signal to noise and readability of the ham radio is better than our other comm circuits."

In 2011, Kenwood Electronics launched an advertising campaign capitalizing on the fact that their TM-D700A transceiver is currently in use on the ISS.

Many of the space station crew are also amateur radio operators. After their standard work day (based on UTC time), they might use their evening free time to communicate with family and other hams via amateur radio. Crew member Kjell N. Lindgren spoke with a young operator in the UK during the summer of 2022 and later they exchanged photos and cards. Crew members from ISS Expedition 69 and Expedition 70 as well as Axiom 1 and Axiom 2 have made recent space to ground contacts with schools via Amateur Radio.

== Interoperable Radio System (IORS) ==
Interoperable Radio System (IORS) is the foundation element of the ARISS next-generation radio system on ISS. A total of four flight units and ten total units are being built by the ARISS hardware team. This first IORS radio was flown to ISS on SpaceX CRS-20 and installed in the ISS Columbus module by Expedition 63 Commander, Chris Cassidy on September 2, 2020. System activation was first observed at 01:02 UTC on September 2 by ARISS control station and amateur radio ground operators. Initial operation of the new radio system began as an FM cross band repeater.

A second flight unit has launched on a later 2020 cargo flight for installation in the Russian Service module. Since 2022 ARISS has been using IORS radios in both the Columbus and Service Modules. The Columbus Module radio typically functions as the crossband voice repeater when not being used for contacts with students. The Service Module IORS radio typically is used for packet radio operations like Automatic Packet Reporting System activities or Slow-scan television events. The IORS consists of a special, modified JVCKenwood D710GA transceiver, an AMSAT-developed multi voltage power supply and interconnecting cables.

The IORS has a higher power radio, an enhanced voice repeater, updated digital packet radio (APRS) capabilities and slow scan television (SSTV) capabilities for both the US and Russian segments.
