= STS-56 =

1993 American crewed spaceflight

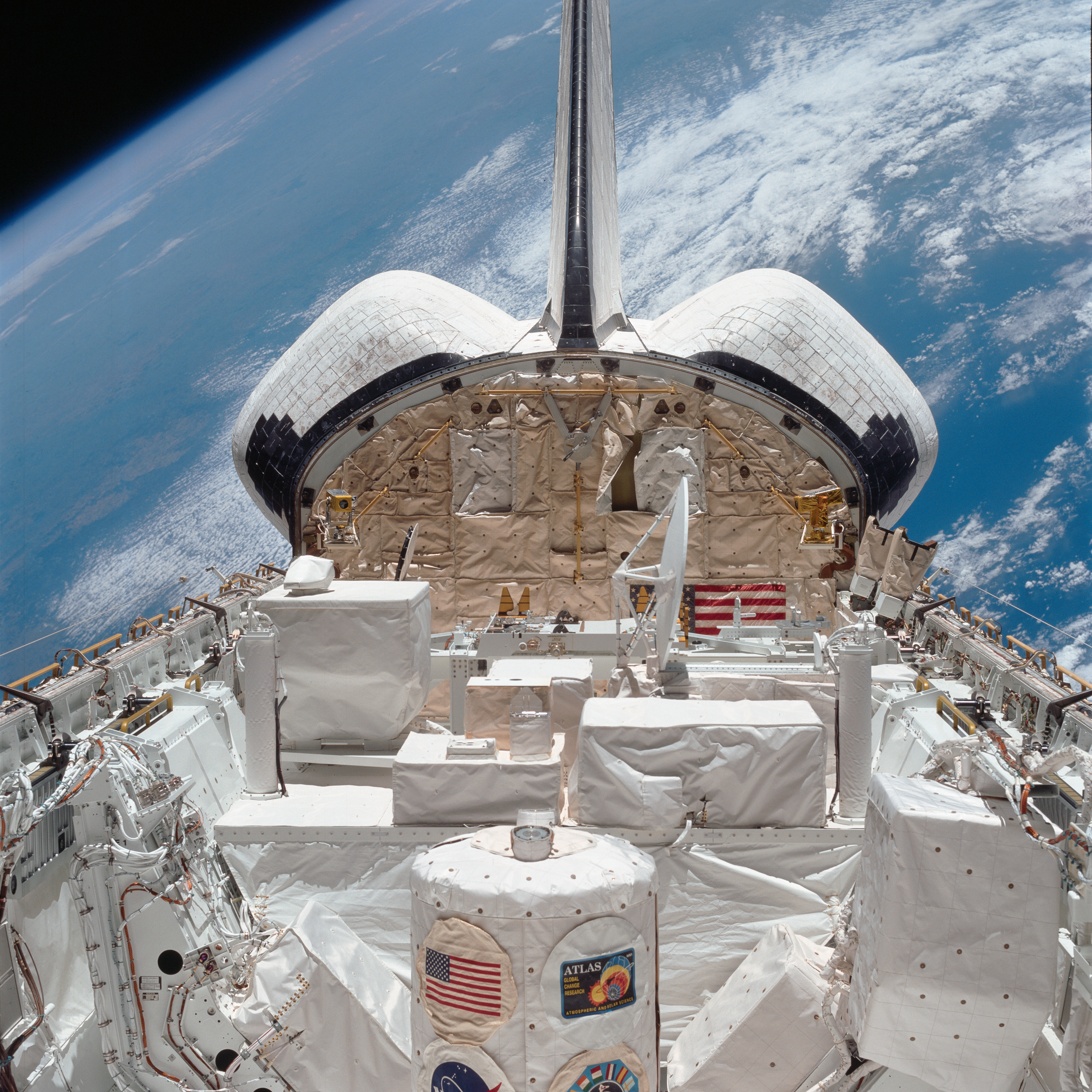
- Components of the ATLAS-2 laboratory in the payload bay of Discovery
- Names: Space Transportation System-56
- Mission type: Scientific research
- Operator: NASA
- COSPAR ID: 1993-023A
- SATCAT no.: 22621
- Mission duration: 9 days, 6 hours, 8 minutes, 19 seconds
- Distance travelled: 6,202,407 km (3,853,997 mi)
- Orbits completed: 148

Spacecraft properties
- Spacecraft: Space Shuttle Discovery
- Landing mass: 93,683 kg (206,536 lb)
- Payload mass: 7,026 kg (15,490 lb)

Crew
- Crew size: 5
- Members: Kenneth D. Cameron; Stephen S. Oswald; Michael Foale; Kenneth Cockrell; Ellen Ochoa

Start of mission
- Launch date: April 8, 1993, 05:29:00 UTC (1:29 am EDT)
- Launch site: Kennedy, LC-39B
- Contractor: Rockwell International

End of mission
- Landing date: April 17, 1993, 11:37:19 UTC (7:37:19 am EDT)
- Landing site: Kennedy, SLF Runway 33

Orbital parameters
- Reference system: Geocentric orbit
- Regime: Low Earth orbit
- Perigee altitude: 291 km (181 mi)
- Apogee altitude: 299 km (186 mi)
- Inclination: 57.00°
- Period: 90.40 minutes

Instruments
- Active Cavity Radiometer (ACR); Air Force Maui Optical Site (AMOS); Atmospheric Trace Molecule Spectroscopy (ATMOS); Commercial Materials dispersion apparatus Instrumentation technology associates Experiment (CMIX); Cosmic Ray Effects and Activation Monitor (CREAM); Get Away Special (GAS); Hand-held, Earth-oriented, Real-time, Cooperative, User-friendly, Location-targeting and Environmental System (HERCULES); Millimeter Wave Atmospheric Sounder (MAS); Physiological and Anatomical Rodent Experiment (PARE); Radiation Monitoring Equipment (RME III); Shuttle Amateur Radio Experiment (SAREX II); Solar Spectroscopy Instrument (SOLSPEC); Solar Ultraviolet Experiment (SUVE); Shuttle Solar Backscatter Ultraviolet (SSBUV/A); Solar Constant (SOLCON); Space Tissue Loss (STL-1); Solar Ultraviolet Irradiance Monitor (SUSIM)
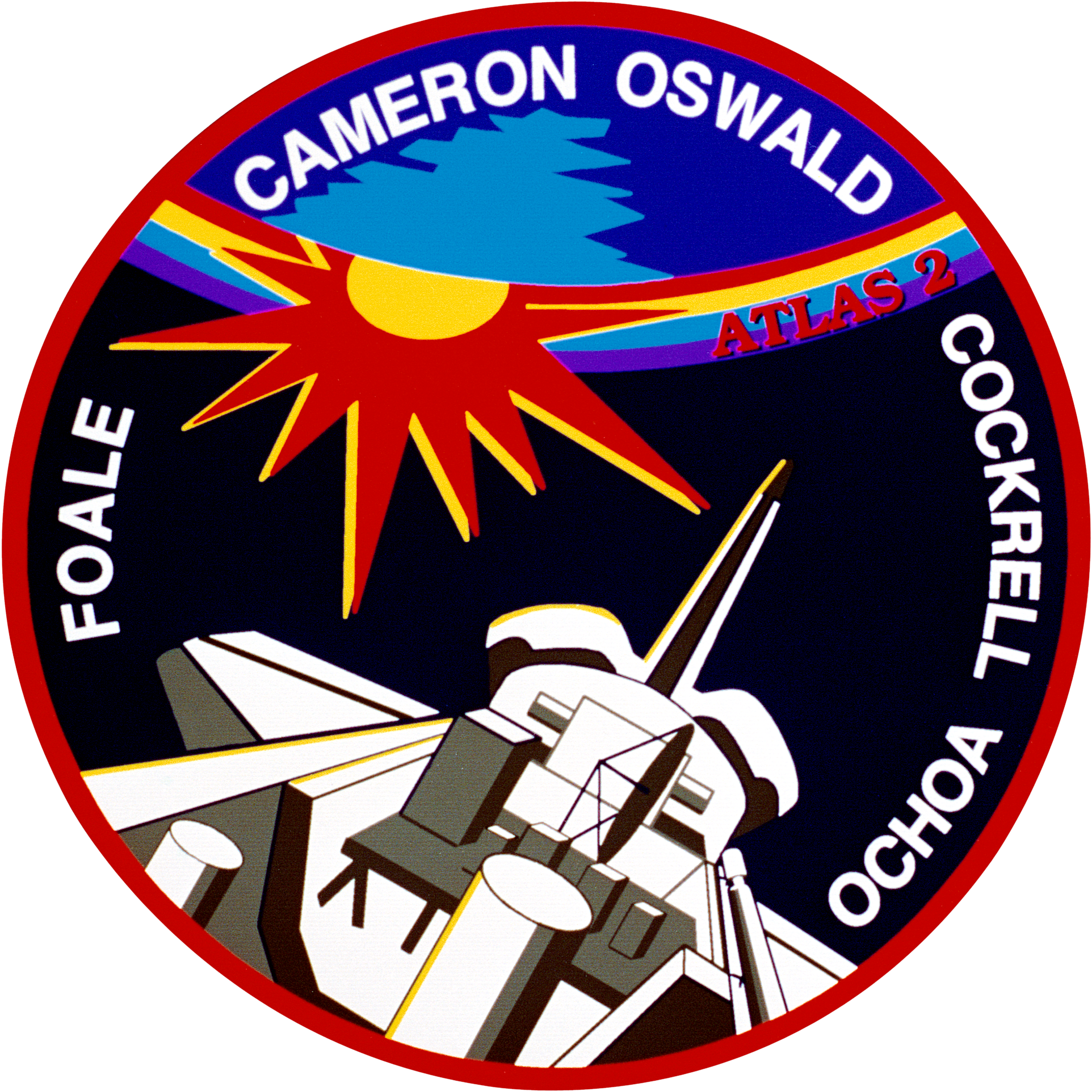
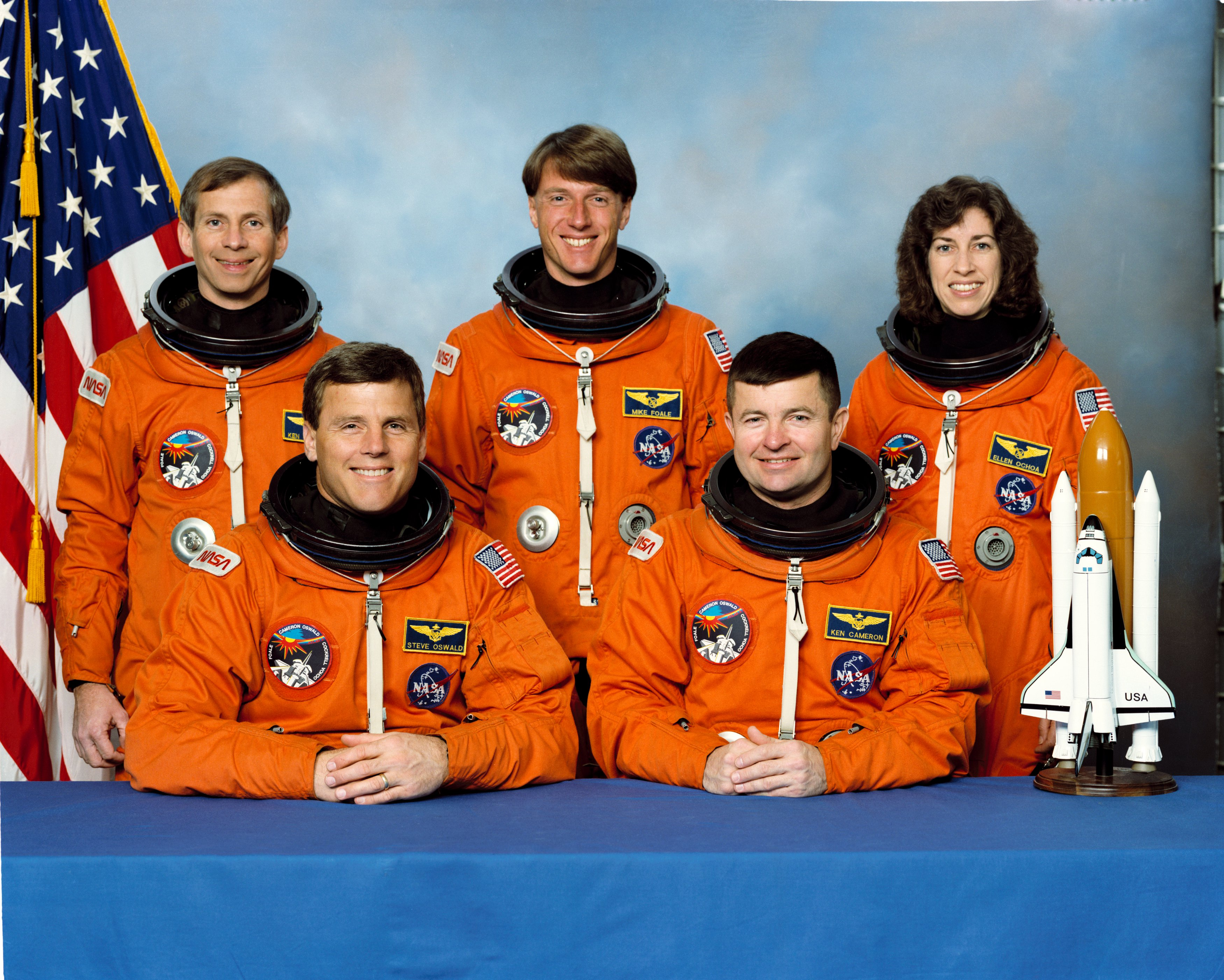
- STS-56 mission patch Standing: Cockrell, Foale, Ochoa; Seated: Oswald, Cameron Space Shuttle program

STS-56 was a NASA Space Shuttle Discovery mission to perform special experiments. It was Discovery's 16th flight. The mission was launched from Kennedy Space Center, Florida, on April 8, 1993.

== Crew ==
Position	Astronaut
Commander	(United States) Kenneth D. Cameron; Second spaceflight
Pilot	(United States) Stephen S. Oswald; Second spaceflight
Mission Specialist 1	(United States) / (United Kingdom) Michael Foale; Second spaceflight
Mission Specialist 2 Flight Engineer	(United States) Kenneth Cockrell; First spaceflight
Mission Specialist 3	(United States) Ellen Ochoa; First spaceflight

=== Crew seat assignments ===
Seat	Launch	Landing	Seats 1–4 are on the flight deck. Seats 5–7 are on the mid-deck.
1	Cameron		Seats 1–4 are on the flight deck. Seats 5–7 are on the mid-deck.
2	Oswald		Seats 1–4 are on the flight deck. Seats 5–7 are on the mid-deck.
3	Foale	Ochoa	Seats 1–4 are on the flight deck. Seats 5–7 are on the mid-deck.
4	Cockrell		Seats 1–4 are on the flight deck. Seats 5–7 are on the mid-deck.
5	Ochoa	Foale	Seats 1–4 are on the flight deck. Seats 5–7 are on the mid-deck.
6	Unused		Seats 1–4 are on the flight deck. Seats 5–7 are on the mid-deck.
7	Unused		Seats 1–4 are on the flight deck. Seats 5–7 are on the mid-deck.

== Mission highlights ==
Attempt	Planned	Result	Turnaround	Reason	Decision point	Weather go (%)	Notes
1	6 Apr 1993, 2:32:00 am	Scrubbed	—	Technical	6 Apr 1993, 2:31 am (T−00:00:11)	80	T−9 minute hold extended for one hour due to high temperatures on SSME 1. The launch was scrubbed when a liquid hydrogen bleed valve was indicated as open when it was actually closed as required. The erroneous indication was caused by a faulty relay.
2	8 Apr 1993, 1:29:00 am	Success	1 day 22 hours 57 minutes			90	Flash evaporator system shut down four minutes into flight, but was manually restarted by the crew.

The primary payload of the flight was the Atmospheric Laboratory for Applications and Science-2 (ATLAS-2), designed to collect data on the relationship between the Sun's energy output and Earth's middle atmosphere and how these factors affect the ozone layer. It included six instruments mounted on a Spacelab pallet in the cargo bay, with the seventh mounted on the wall of the bay in two Get Away Special (GAS) canisters. Atmospheric instruments included the Atmospheric Trace Molecule Spectroscopy (ATMOS) experiment, the Millimeter Wave Atmospheric Sounder (MAS), and the Shuttle Solar Backscatter Ultraviolet (SSBUV/A) spectrometer (on the cargo bay wall). Solar science instruments were the solar spectrometry instrument SOLSPEC, the Solar Ultraviolet Irradiance Monitor (SUSIM), and the Active Cavity Radiometer (ACR) and Solar Constant (SOLCON) experiments.

ATLAS-2 is one element of NASA's Mission to Planet Earth program. All seven ATLAS-2 instruments first flew on ATLAS-1 during STS-45, and flew a third time in late 1994 on STS-66.

On April 11, 1993, the crew used the remote manipulator arm (Canadarm) to deploy the Shuttle Point Autonomous Research Tool for Astronomy-201 (SPARTAN-201), a free-flying science instrument platform designed to study velocity and acceleration of the solar wind and observe the Sun's corona. Collected data was stored on tape for playback after return to Earth. SPARTAN-201 was retrieved on April 13, 1993.

The crew also made numerous radio contacts to schools around the world using the Shuttle Amateur Radio Experiment (SAREX II), including brief radio contact with the Russian Mir space station, the first such contact between Space Shuttle and Mir using amateur radio equipment.

Other cargo bay payloads were the Solar Ultraviolet Experiment (SUVE), sponsored by Colorado Space Grant Consortium and located in a GetAway Special canister on the cargo bay wall.

The middeck payloads were the Commercial Materials Dispersion Apparatus Instrumentation Technology Associates Experiment (CMIX), the Physiological and Anatomical Rodent Experiment (PARE), Space Tissue Loss (STL-1) experiment, the Cosmic Ray Effects and Activation Monitor (CREAM) experiment. the Hand-held, Earth-oriented, Real-time, Cooperative, User-friendly, Location-targeting and Environmental System (HERCULES), Radiation Monitoring Equipment (RME III), and an Air Force Maui Optical Site (AMOS) calibration test.

== Gallery ==
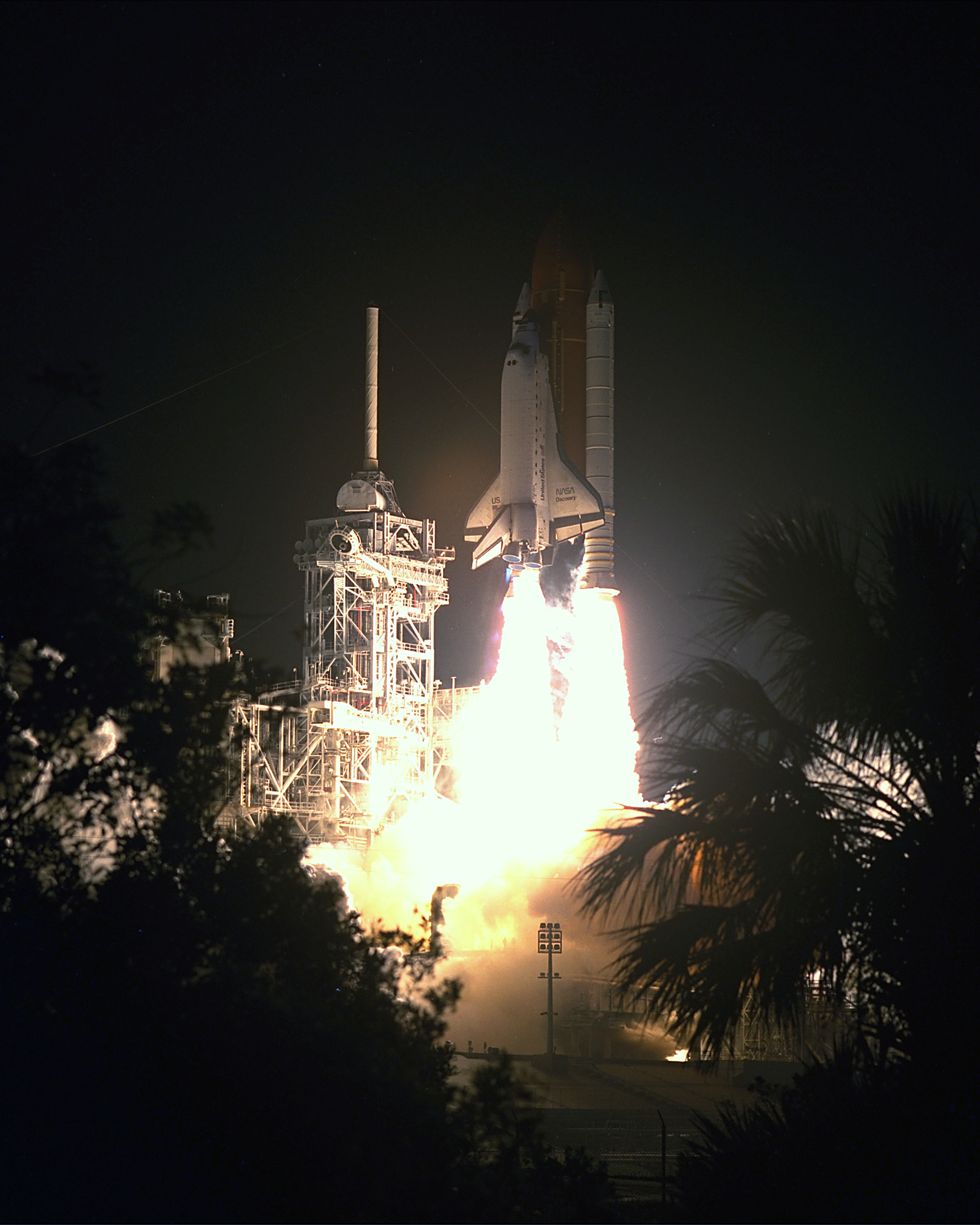
Launch of STS-56

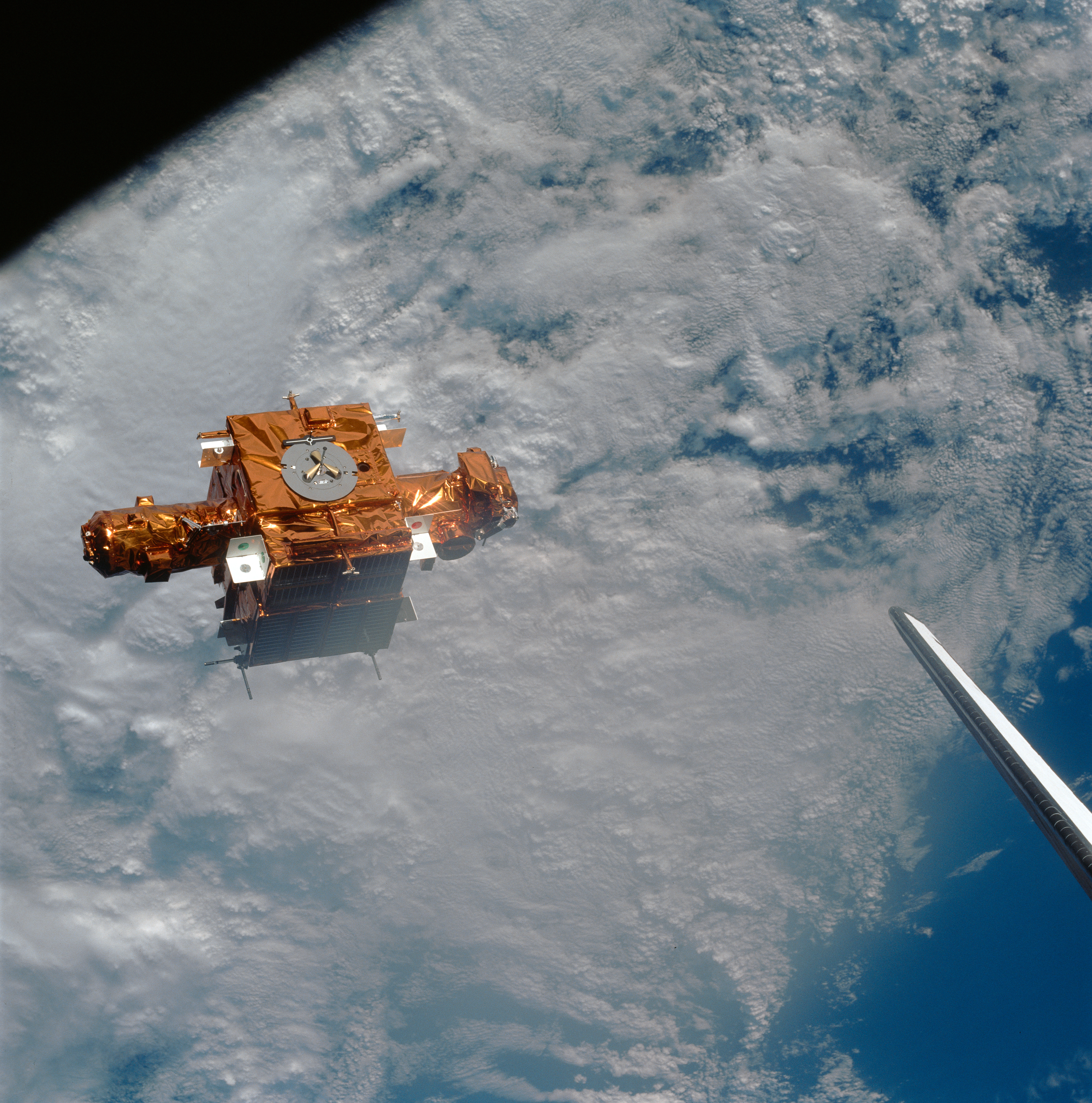
SPARTAN-201

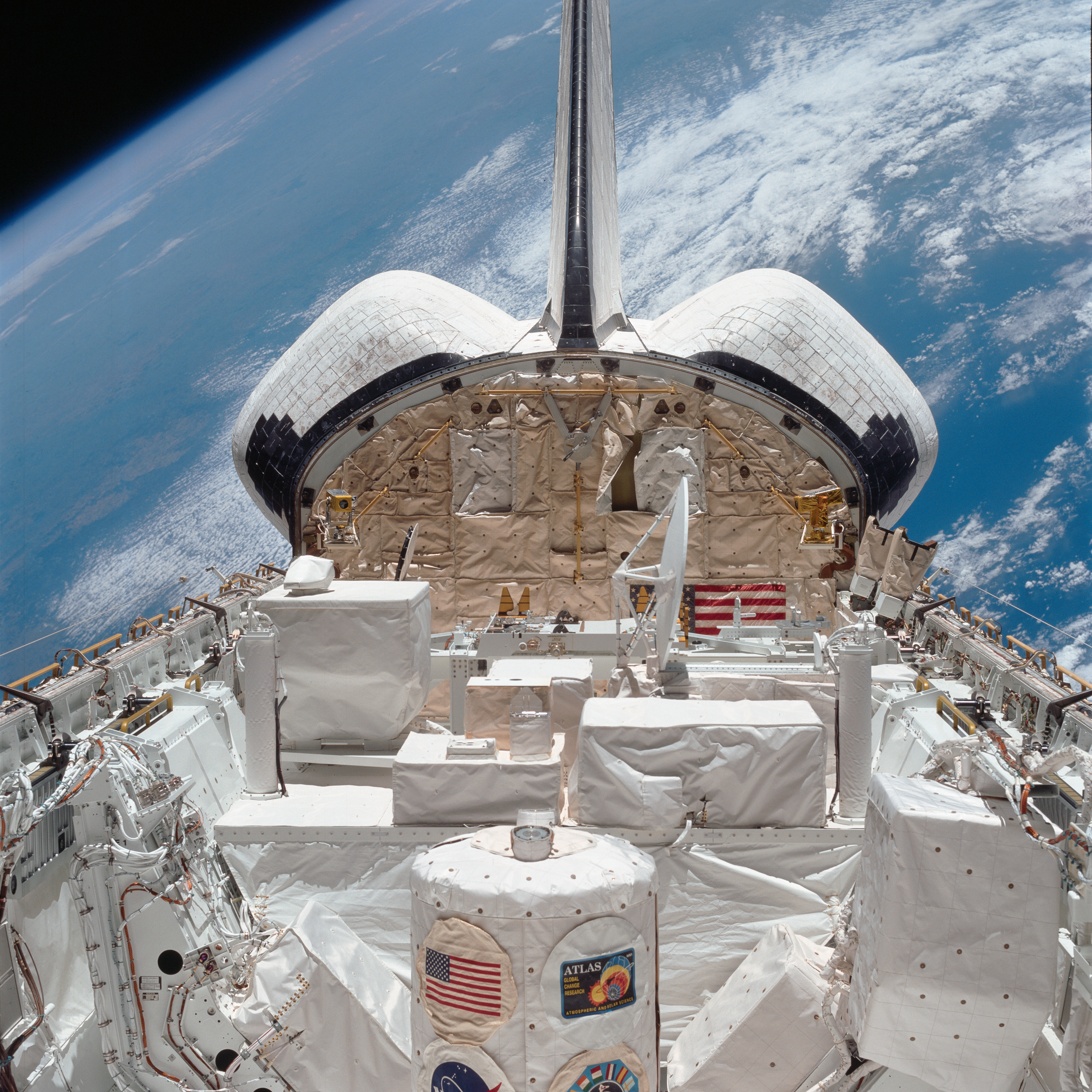
Payload bay view with ATLAS pallet

== See also ==
- List of human spaceflights
- List of Space Shuttle missions
- Nikon NASA F4
- Outline of space science
- Space Shuttle
