= Jerome Apt =

American astronaut, scientist, and professor (born 1949)

Jay Apt
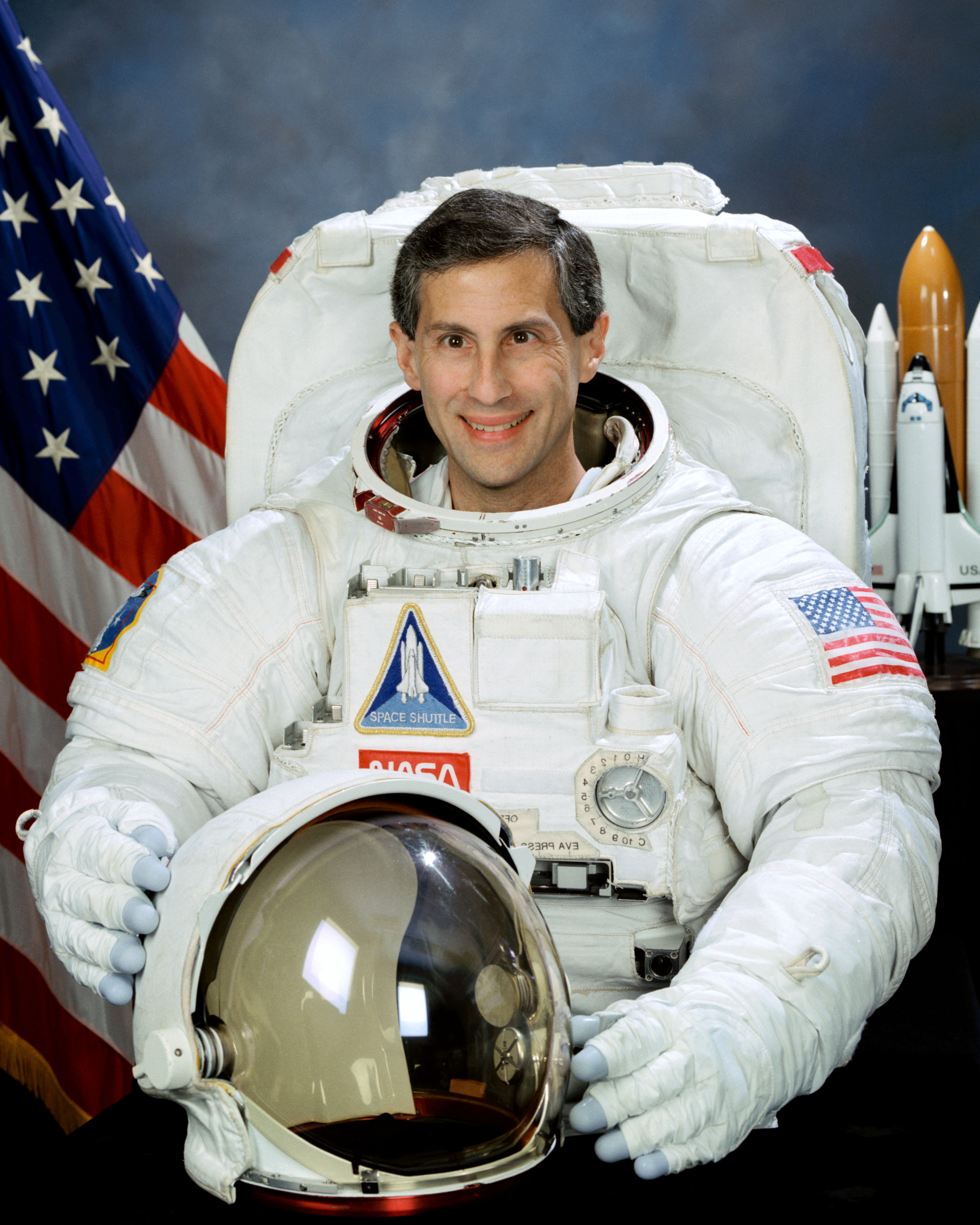
- Born: Jerome Apt III; April 28, 1949 (age 77); Springfield, Massachusetts, U.S.
- Education: Harvard University (AB); Massachusetts Institute of Technology (PhD)
- Space career

NASA astronaut
- Time in space: 35d 7h 10min
- Selection: NASA Group 11 (1985)
- Total EVAs: 2
- Total EVA time: 10h, 29m
- Mission: STS-37; STS-47; STS-59; STS-79

Jerome "Jay" Apt III (born April 28, 1949) is a retired NASA astronaut and professor at Carnegie Mellon University. During his time at NASA, Apt was a flight controller in the Mission Control Center and completed four space flights logging over 35 days in space. Before becoming an astronaut, Apt was a physicist who worked on the Pioneer Venus 1978 space probe project, and used visible light and infrared techniques to study the planets and moons of the Solar System from ground-based observatories. Apt is an instrument-rated commercial pilot, and has logged over 7,000 hours flying time in approximately 25 different types of airplanes, seaplanes, sailplanes, and human-powered aircraft.

== Early life ==
Apt was a resident of Shadyside and graduated from Shady Side Academy in Pittsburgh, Pennsylvania, in 1967. He went on to attend Harvard University, earning a Bachelor of Arts in physics magna cum laude in 1971. He then attended the Massachusetts Institute of Technology and earned a Doctor of Philosophy in experimental atomic physics in 1976.

== Experience ==
From 1976 to 1980 he was a staff member of the Center for Earth & Planetary Physics at Harvard, and served as the Assistant Director of Harvard's Division of Applied Sciences from 1978 to 1980 and was the founding director of Harvard's Planetary Imaging Computer Center.

== NASA Experience ==
In 1980 he joined the Earth and Space Sciences Division of the NASA Jet Propulsion Laboratory (JPL) as a scientist doing planetary research; he was science manager of the optical facilities at JPL's Table Mountain Observatory. He was the group leader of JPL's optical astronomy group. From 1982 through 1985 he was a flight controller responsible for Shuttle payload operations at NASA's Johnson Space Center. He worked in the mission control center on missions STS-7, STS-8, STS-41B, STS-41C, STS-41D, STS-41G, STS-51A, and STS-51D (the last four as Payload Officer). In 1985 he was selected as an astronaut candidate, and qualified to become an astronaut after a year of training. His assignments while in the Astronaut Office included Shuttle Orbiter modification support at Kennedy Space Center, developing techniques for servicing the Hubble Space Telescope and the Gamma Ray Observatory, development of EVA construction and maintenance techniques for Space Station, as a spacecraft communicator (CAPCOM) for Shuttle flights, and the Astronaut Office EVA point of contact. He has also been the supervisor of Astronaut Training in the Astronaut Office, and has served as Chief of the Astronaut Office Mission Support Branch.

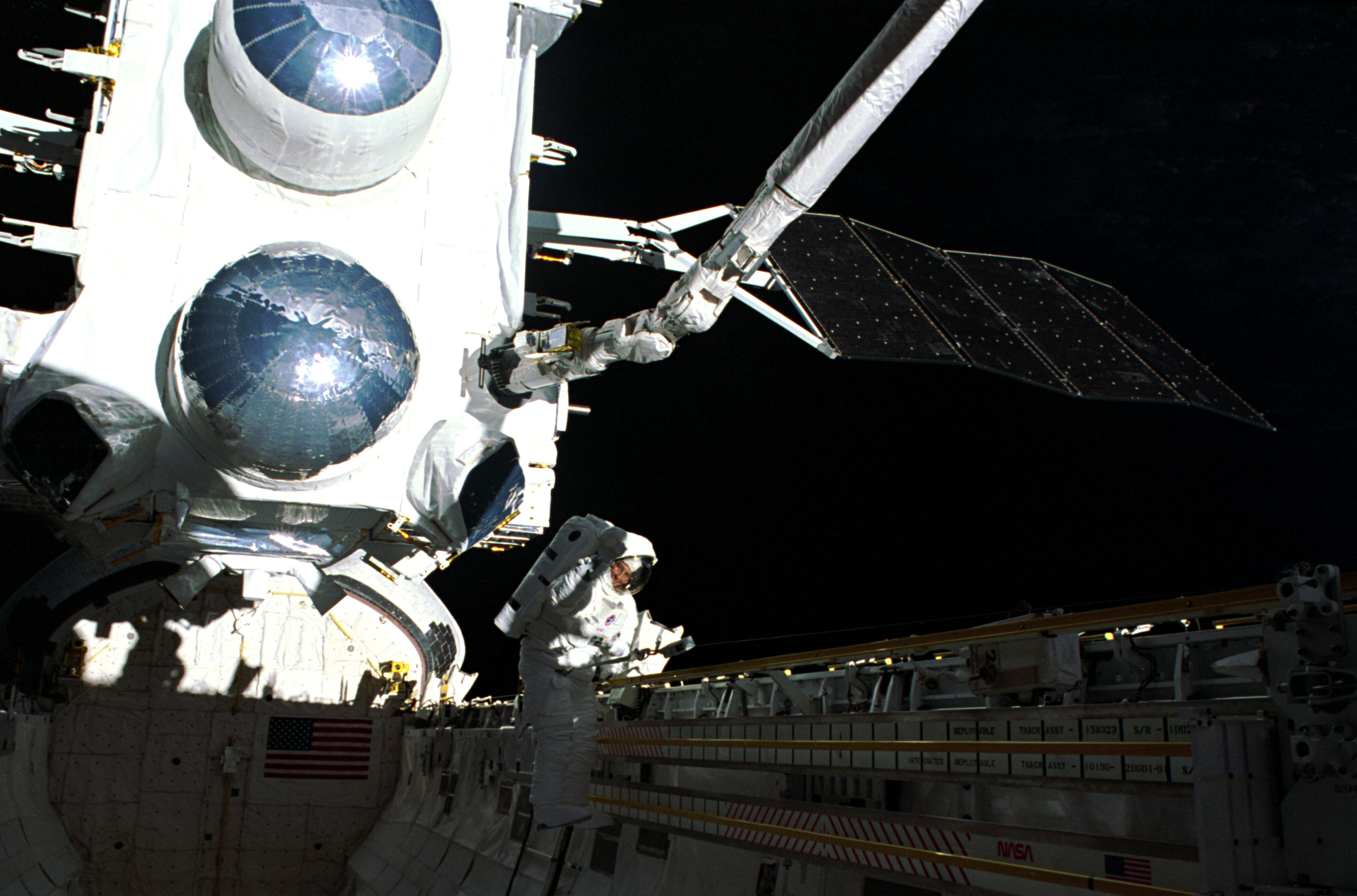
NASA image STS37-051-021 Jay Apt on the first EVA of STS-37 with CGRO

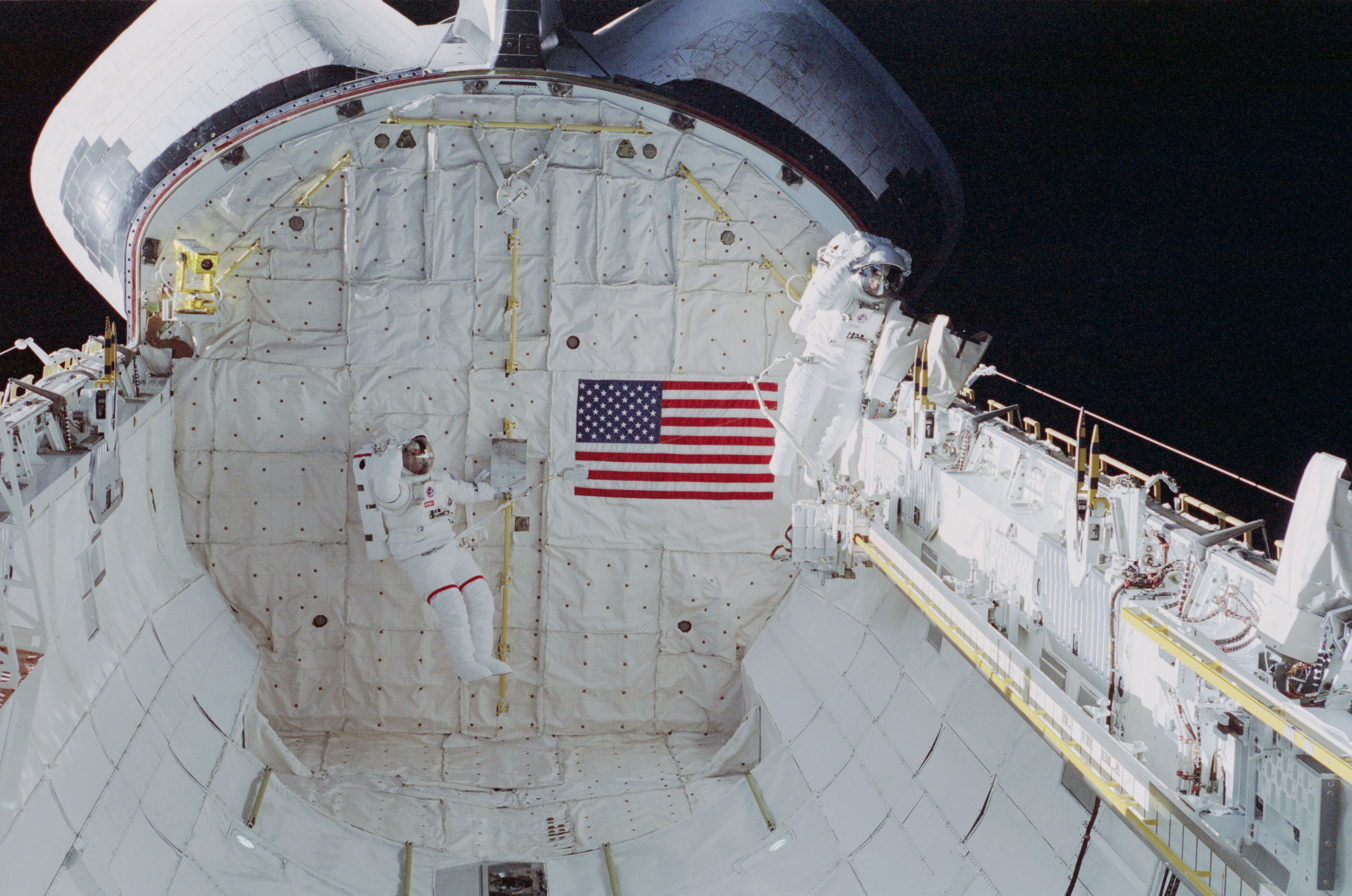
Jerry Ross and Jay Apt on the second EVA of STS-37, April 8, 1991

== Spaceflight experience ==
=== STS-37 ===
In 1991, Apt flew on the STS-37 mission aboard shuttle Atlantis. He made two spacewalks with Jerry Ross, manually deploying the Compton Gamma Ray Observatory's radio antenna when robotic systems failed to do so automatically; on the next day their second spacewalk, the first planned spacewalk in 5-1/2 years, tested hardware later used on the International Space Station, and gathered basic engineering data on the forces a crew member can exert on bolts and equipment. During the second Extra Vehicular Activity the palm-bar in Apt's right glove punctured the suit. Apt's hand conformed to the puncture, filling the hole before any noticeable depressurization could occur. Apt was unaware of the puncture until the glove was examined after the mission. Despite being partially exposed to vacuum he sustained only a minor scar. The crew also conducted research on biologically important molecules, tested concepts for radiating heat from Space Station, operated an amateur radio station, and took over 4000 photographs of the Earth. After completing 93 orbits of the Earth, the crew landed Atlantis at Edwards Air Force Base, California, on April 11, 1991.

=== STS-47 ===
In 1992, Apt flew on STS-47 aboard shuttle Endeavour as the flight engineer, and commander of one of the two shifts in this round-the-clock mission. This eight-day cooperative mission between the United States and Japan was launched on September 12, 1992, to perform life science and materials processing experiments in space. After completing 126 orbits of the Earth, the crew landed Endeavour at Kennedy Space Center, Florida, on September 20, 1992.

=== STS-59 ===
In 1994, Apt was again a shift commander of the first Space Radar Laboratory mission, STS-59 aboard shuttle Endeavour. As the blue shift commander, he was responsible for operating Endeavour during one of the two shifts on an 11-day mission to observe the land and oceans of Earth with three imaging radar systems, and to map the global distribution of carbon monoxide in the lower atmosphere. The crew flew Endeavour through the largest series of maneuvers in Shuttle history up to that time to point the radar precisely at hundreds of ecology, geology, and oceanography sites, providing research scientists the equivalent of 26,000 encyclopedia volumes of data. Real-time crew observations of surface phenomena and climatic conditions augmented with over 14,000 photographs aided investigators in interpretation and calibration of the data. After completing 183 orbits of the Earth, the crew landed Endeavour at Edwards Air Force Base, California.

=== STS-79 ===
In 1996, Apt flew on STS-79 aboard shuttle Atlantis and visited the Russian Mir space station. The crew docked Atlantis with Mir, having ferried supplies, personnel, and scientific equipment to this base 240 miles above the Earth. The crew transferred over 4 tons of scientific experiments and supplies to and from the Mir station and exchanged U.S. astronauts on Mir for the first time - taking John Blaha to Mir and bringing Shannon Lucid home after her record six months stay aboard Mir. This historic mission of international cooperation and scientific research ended at Kennedy Space Center, Florida, after 160 orbits of the Earth.

== Post-NASA research career ==
In 2003, Apt joined the faculty of Carnegie Mellon University where he is a Full Professor (emeritus) at the Tepper School of Business and the Department of Engineering and Public Policy. His research and teaching interests are in economics, engineering, and public policy aspects of the electricity industry, economics of technical innovation, management of technical enterprises, risk management in policy and technical decision framing, and engineering systems design. From 2000 through 2022 he and faculty member Granger Morgan directed the Carnegie Mellon Electricity Industry Center. He has supervised 23 Ph.D. students, 18 as sole advisor.

== Publications ==
He is the author of the book Orbit: NASA Astronauts Photograph the Earth, published by the National Geographic Society. The book has been printed in eleven languages; more than 600,000 copies have been sold. His book Variable Renewable Energy and the Electricity Grid was published in 2014. He is the author of 125 peer-reviewed scientific publications that have been cited over 10,000 times and six chapters in technical books.

== Awards and honors ==
Apt received the NASA Distinguished Service Medal in 1997 and the Metcalf Lifetime Achievement Award for significant contributions to engineering in 2002. He was the recipient of the NASA Exceptional Service Medal in 1993 and 1995. Apt received the Federation Aeronautique Internationale V.M. Komarov Diploma for outstanding achievements in the field of exploration of outer space (1991 and 1992), Sergei P. Korolev Diploma for a non-planned repair of a broken device to make possible the continuation of a mission (1991), and the de la Vaulx Medal (1998). His paper with PhD student Adam Newcomer, "Near term implications of a ban on new coal-fired power plants in the US" was cited as one of the top environmental policy papers of 2009 by the American Chemical Society. In 2012, the International Astronomical Union approved the name "Jeromeapt" for the main-belt asteroid 116903, as suggested by its discoverer, James Young.

== Personal life ==
Apt has two children.

He is a fellow of the American Association for the Advancement of Science and of the Explorers Club. He is a member of the American Physical Society, Institute of Electrical and Electronics Engineers, American Geophysical Union, Society for Risk Analysis, Aircraft Owners and Pilots Association, Experimental Aircraft Association, and Association of Space Explorers.
