= Kenneth D. Cameron =

American astronaut, aviator and engineer (born 1949)

Kenneth Cameron
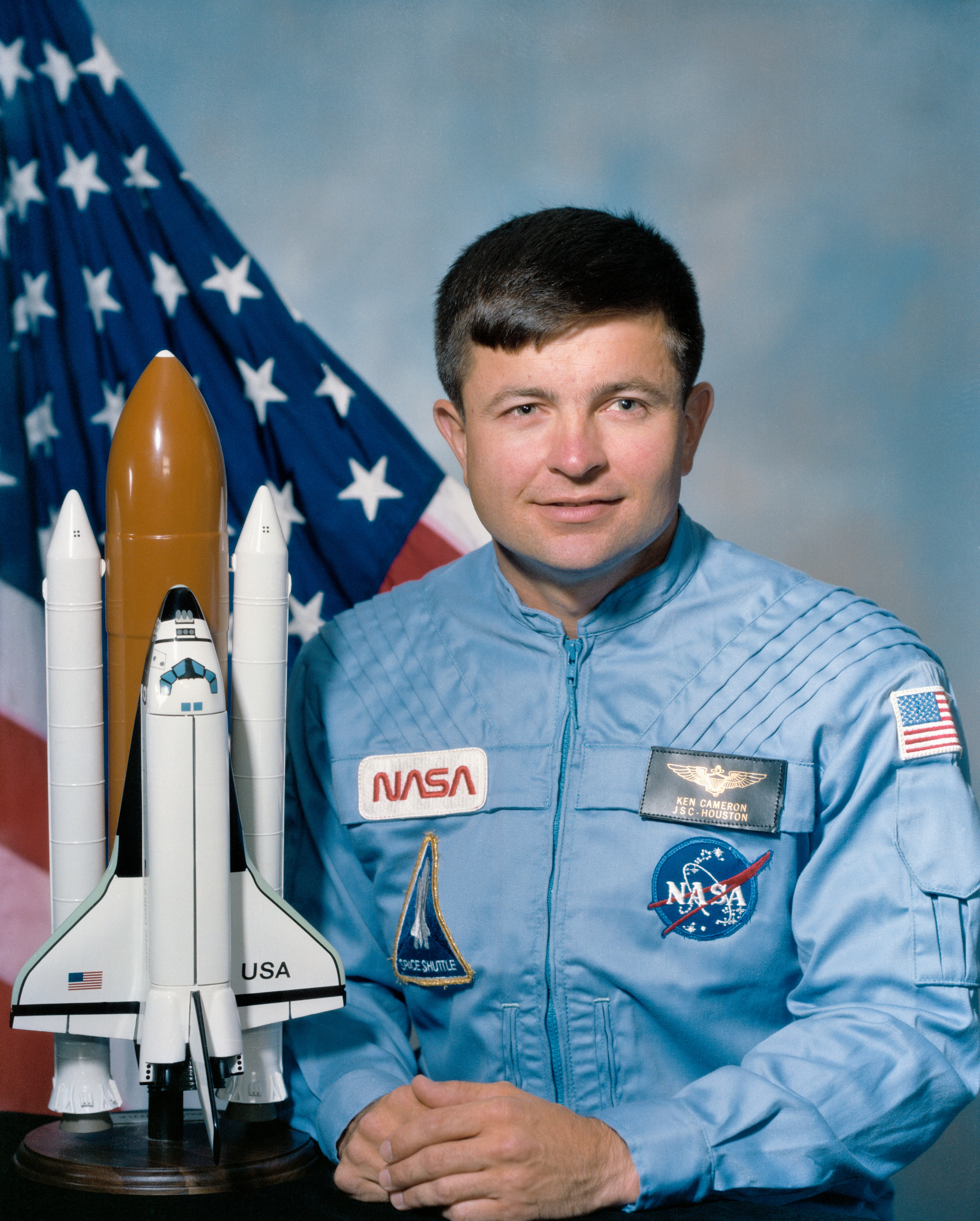
- Official portrait, 1985
- Born: Kenneth Donald Cameron; November 29, 1949 (age 76); Cleveland, Ohio, U.S.
- Education: Massachusetts Institute of Technology (BS, MS); Michigan State University (MBA)
- Awards: Legion of Merit; Defense Superior Service Medal; Distinguished Flying Cross
- Space career

NASA astronaut
- Rank: Colonel, USMC
- Time in space: 23d 10h 11m
- Selection: NASA Group 10 (1984)
- Missions: STS-37; STS-56; STS-74
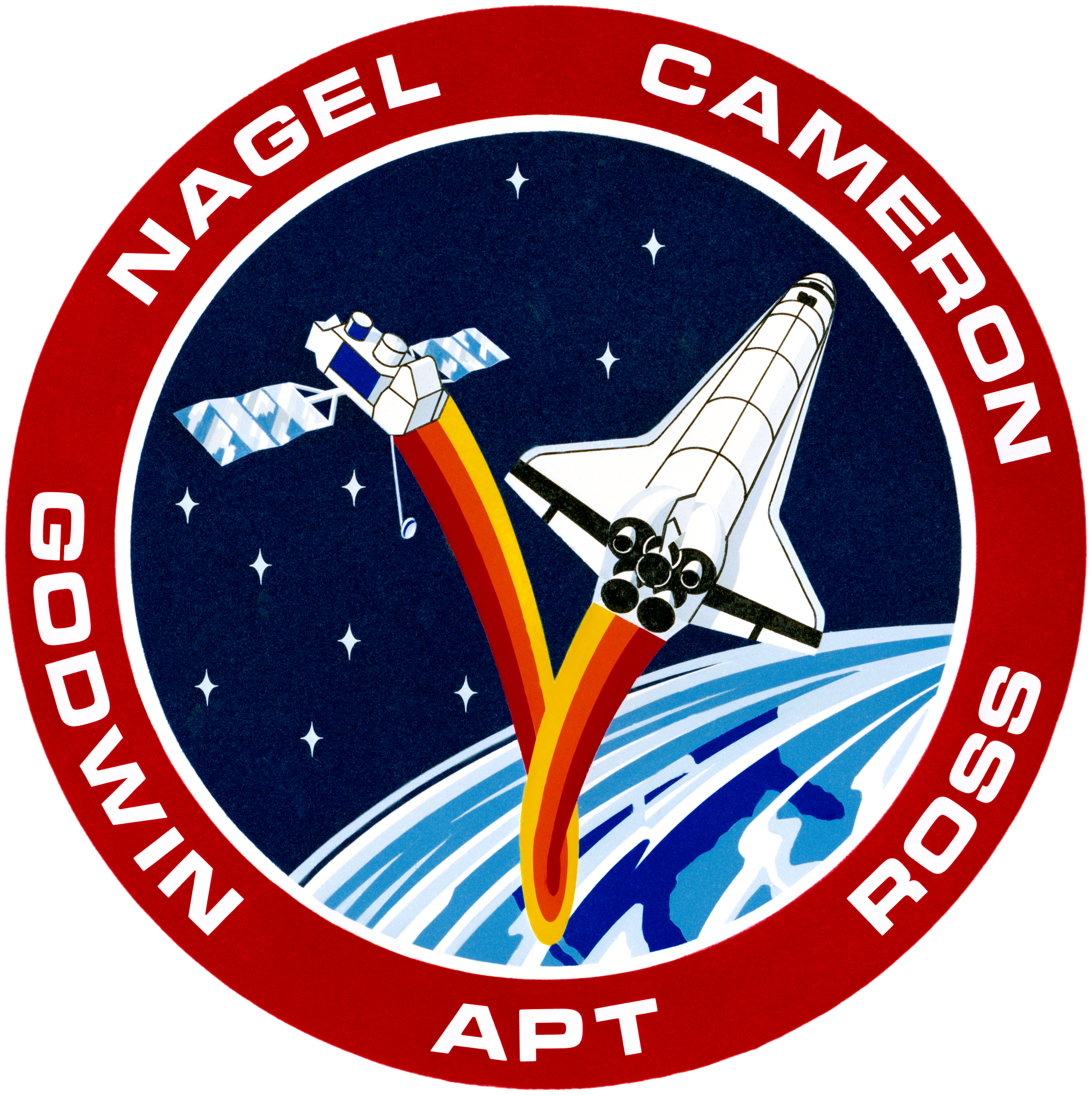
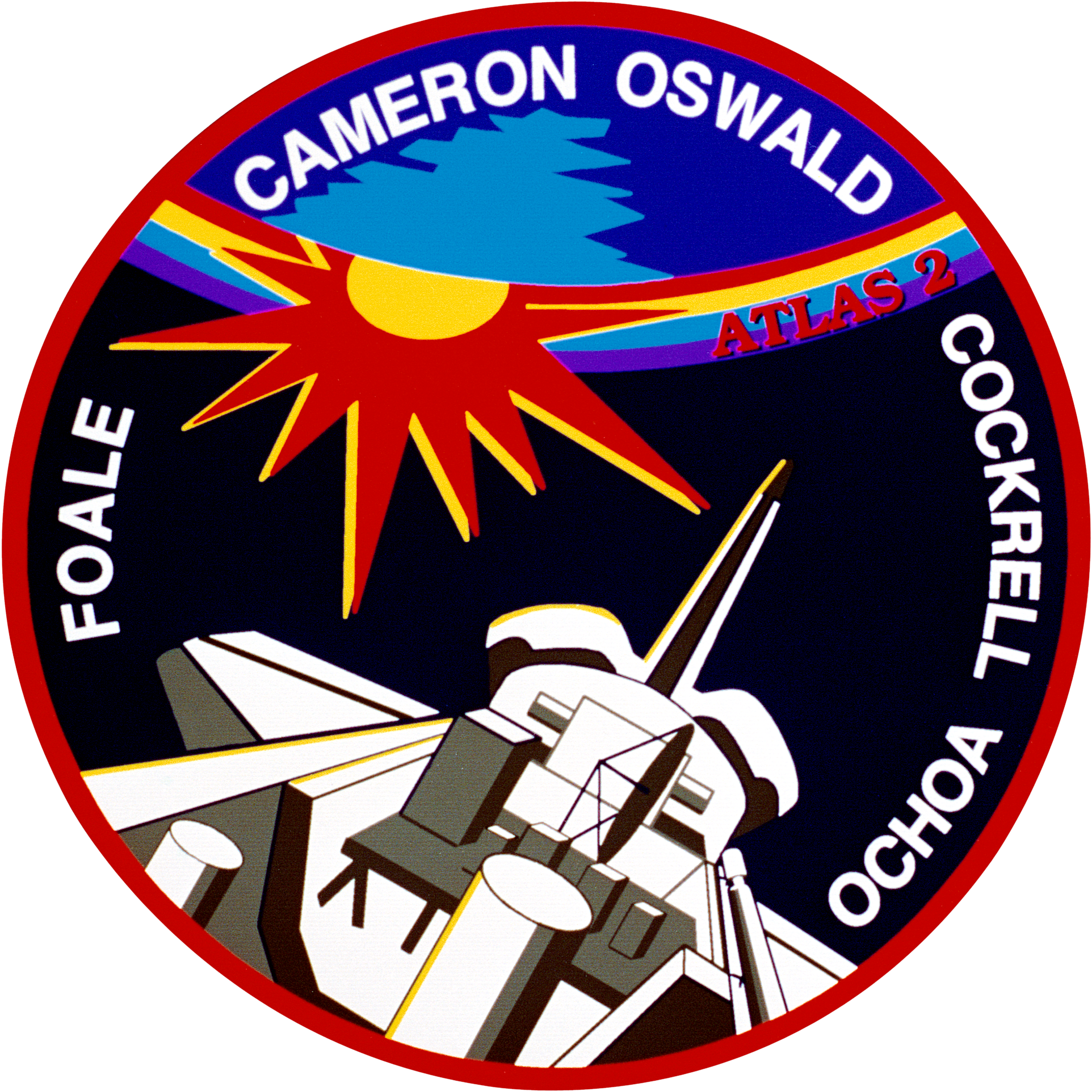
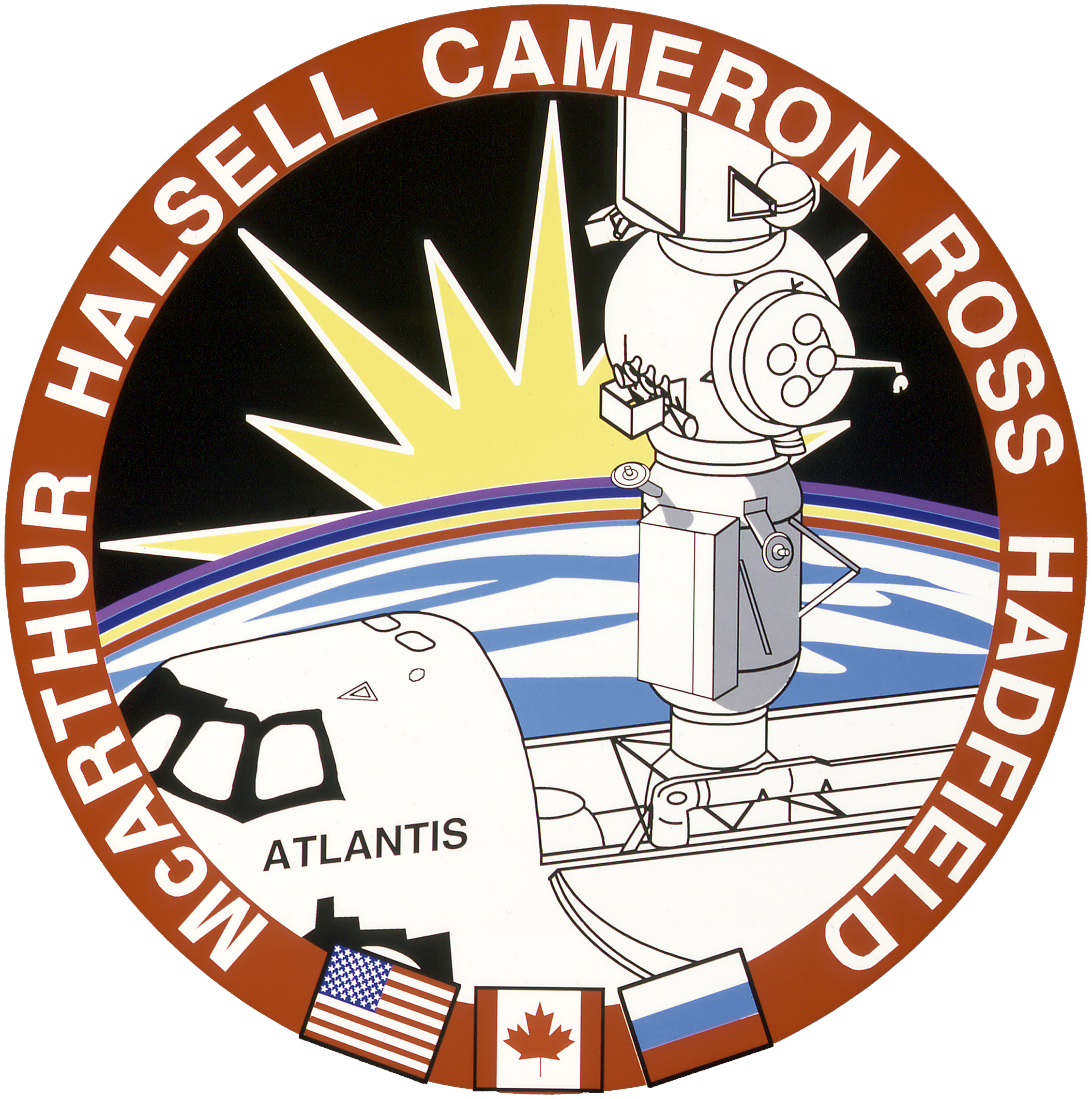
- Mission insignia
- Retired: December 2008

Kenneth Donald Cameron (born November 29, 1949), (Col, USMC, Ret.), is an American retired naval aviator, test pilot, engineer, U.S. Marine Corps officer, and NASA astronaut.

== Background ==
Cameron was born November 29, 1949, in Cleveland, Ohio. He graduated from Rocky River High School, Rocky River, Ohio, in 1967. He attended the Massachusetts Institute of Technology, receiving a Bachelor of Science degree in aeronautics and astronautics in 1978, and a Master of Science degree in aeronautics and astronautics in 1979. He completed numerous courses in Russian language and Russian space systems at MIT, the Lyndon B. Johnson Space Center, and at the Gagarin Cosmonaut Training Center, Moscow, Russia. He later earned a Master of Business Administration from Michigan State University in 2002. He enjoys flying, athletics, woodworking, reading, shooting, motorcycle riding, and amateur radio.

He was a Boy Scout and earned the rank of Star Scout. At MIT, Cameron was a member of the Beta Theta Pi fraternity.

== Military and flight experience ==
Cameron was commissioned in the U.S. Marine Corps in 1970 at Officer Candidate School at Marine Corps Base Quantico, Virginia. After graduating from The Basic School and Vietnamese language school, he was assigned to the Republic of Vietnam for a one-year tour of duty as an infantry platoon commander with the 1st Battalion, 5th Marines and later with the Marine Security Guards at the U.S. Embassy in Saigon. Upon his return to the United States, he served as executive officer with India Company, 3rd Battalion, 2nd Marines, at Marine Corps Base Camp Lejeune, North Carolina. He reported to Naval Air Station Pensacola, Florida, in 1972 for flight training, receiving his Naval Aviator wings in 1973. He was then assigned to VMA-223 at Marine Corps Air Station Yuma, Arizona, flying A-4M Skyhawks.

In 1976, Cameron was reassigned to the Massachusetts Institute of Technology, where he participated in the Marine College Degree and Advanced Degree Programs. Upon graduation, he was assigned to flying duty for one year with Marine Aircraft Group 12 at Marine Corps Air Station Iwakuni, Japan. He was subsequently assigned to the Pacific Missile Test Center in 1980, and in 1982 to the U.S. Naval Test Pilot School at Naval Air Station Patuxent River, Maryland. Following graduation in 1983, he was assigned as project officer and test pilot in the F/A-18 Hornet, A-4, and OV-10 Bronco airplanes with the Systems Engineering Test Directorate at the Naval Air Test Center.

He has logged over 4,000 hours flying time in 48 different types of aircraft.

== NASA career ==
Selected by NASA in May 1984, Cameron became an astronaut in June 1985. His technical assignments have included work on Tethered Satellite Payload, flight software testing in the Shuttle Avionics Integration Laboratory (SAIL), launch support activities at Kennedy Space Center, and spacecraft communicator (CAPCOM) in Mission Control for five Space Shuttle missions (STS-29, 30, 28, 34 and 33). Cameron's management assignments in NASA include Section Chief for astronaut software testing in SAIL, astronaut launch support activities, and Operations Assistant to the Hubble Repair Mission Director. In 1994, Cameron served as the first NASA Director of Operations in Star City, Russia, where he worked with the Gagarin Cosmonaut Training Center staff to set up a support system for astronaut operations and training in Star City, and received Russian training in Soyuz and Mir spacecraft systems, and flight training in Russian L-39 aircraft.

He was absent from NASA between 1996 and 2003. However, following the loss of the Space Shuttle Columbia and her crew, Cameron returned to the space program in October 2003, taking a founding position as a Principal Engineer in the NASA Engineering & Safety Center, based at the NASA Langley Research Center, in Hampton, Virginia. In June 2005, Cameron was selected as Deputy Director for Safety of the NESC, and in June 2007 he was relocated to the NESC office at the Johnson Space Center in Houston.

A veteran of three space flights, Cameron has logged over 561 hours in space. He served as pilot on STS-37 (April 5–11, 1991), and was the spacecraft commander on STS-56 (April 9–17, 1993) and STS-74 (November 12–20, 1995).

=== Spaceflight experience ===
Cameron flew his first mission as pilot on STS-37. This mission was launched on April 5, 1991, and featured the deployment of the Gamma Ray Observatory for the purpose of exploring gamma ray sources throughout the universe. Space Shuttle Atlantis landed on April 11, 1991. On his second mission, he was spacecraft commander on STS-56, carrying ATLAS-2. During this nine-day mission, the crew of Space Shuttle Discovery conducted atmospheric and solar studies in order to better understand the effect of solar activity on the Earth's climate and environment, and deployed and retrieved the autonomous observatory Spartan. STS-56 launched on April 8, 1993, and landed at Kennedy Space Center on April 17, 1993. On his third mission, Cameron commanded Atlantis on STS-74, NASA's second Space Shuttle mission to rendezvous and dock with the Russian space station Mir, and the first mission to use the Shuttle to assemble a module and attach it to a space station. STS-74 launched on November 12, 1995, and landed at Kennedy Space Center on November 20, 1995.

== Post-NASA career ==
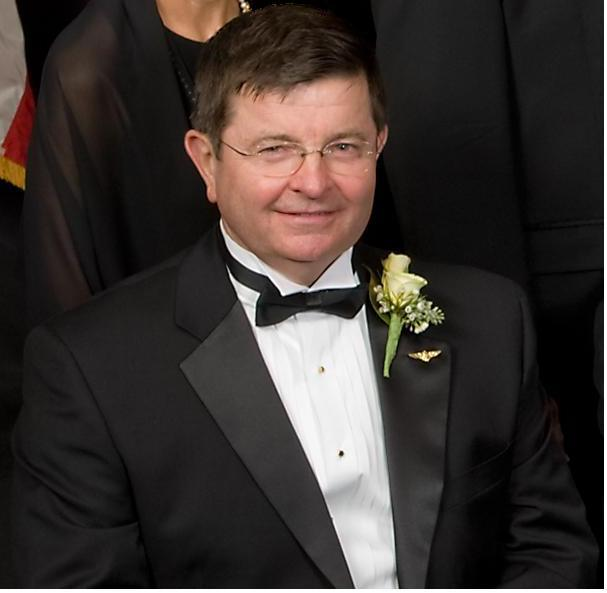
Cameron in 2008

Following his first NASA retirement on August 5, 1996, he joined Hughes Training, Inc., a subsidiary of General Motors Corporation, as executive director of Houston Operations. In September 1997, Cameron transferred to Saab Automobile, AB, in Sweden, as Vehicle Line Executive for the Saab 9-3 automobile. He was called "Kalle Comet" by his co workers at Saab. Upon his return to the United States, Cameron worked at the General Motors Technical Center in Warren, Michigan, near Detroit, in positions in World Wide Purchasing, Supplier Technology Acquisition, Research and Development, and Fuel Cell Vehicle Development.

Cameron retired from NASA for good in December 2008 to join Northrop Grumman Corporation as the Director of Houston Operations for Northrop Grumman Aerospace Systems. Cameron currently owns and flies a Cozy MK IV, an experimental airplane of composite fiberglass construction with canard design configuration and pusher propeller. He lives in Houston, Texas.

== Awards and honors ==
- Defense Superior Service Medal
- Legion of Merit
- Distinguished Flying Cross (2)
- Navy Commendation Medal with Combat "V"
- Combat Action Ribbon
- NASA Leadership Medal
- NASA Exceptional Achievement Medal
- NASA Space Flight Medals (3)
- Vietnamese Meritorious Unit Citation
- Admiral Louis de Flores Award (MIT)
- Charles Stark Draper Laboratory Fellowship
- Marine Corps Association Leadership Sword
