= Expedition 34 =

Long-duration mission to the International Space Station

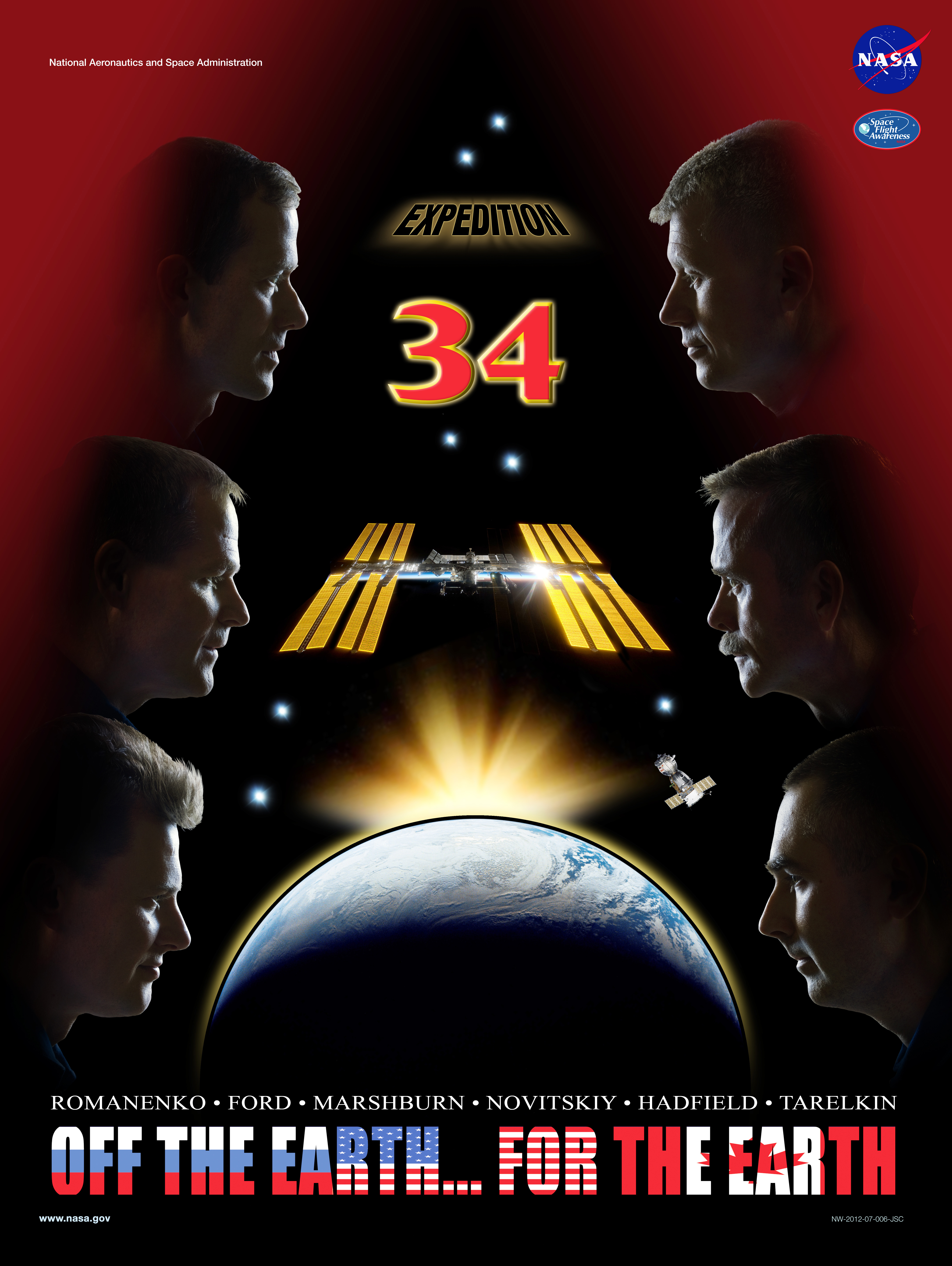
- Promotional Poster
- Mission type: Long-duration expedition

Expedition
- Space station: International Space Station
- Began: 18 November 2012
- Ended: 15 March 2013
- Arrived aboard: Soyuz TMA-06M; Soyuz TMA-07M
- Departed aboard: Soyuz TMA-06M; Soyuz TMA-07M

Crew
- Crew size: 6
- Members: Expedition 33/34: Kevin A. Ford; Oleg Novitskiy; Evgeny Tarelkin Expedition 34/35: Thomas H. Marshburn; Chris A. Hadfield; Roman Romanenko
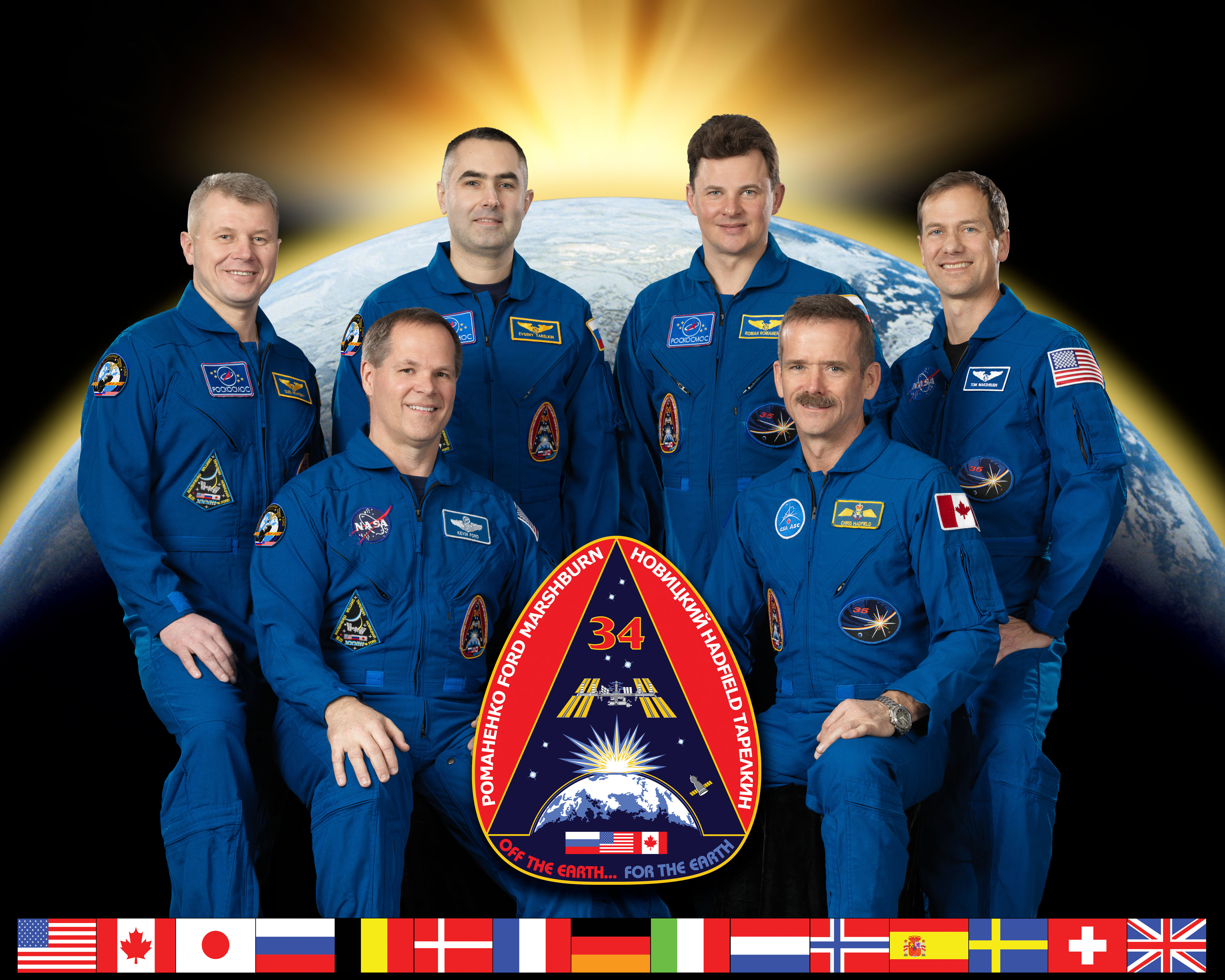
- Expedition 34 mission patch (l-r) Novitskiy, Ford, Tarelkin, Romanenko, Hadfield and Marshburn ISS expeditions

Expedition 34 was the 34th long-duration expedition to the International Space Station (ISS). It began on 18 November 2012 with the departure from the ISS of the Soyuz TMA-05M spacecraft, which returned the Expedition 33 crew to Earth.

== Crew ==
Position	First Part (November 2012)	Second Part (December 2012 to March 2013)
Commander	Kevin A. Ford, NASA; Second and last spaceflight	
Flight Engineer 1	Oleg Novitskiy, RSA; First spaceflight	
Flight Engineer 2	Evgeny Tarelkin, RSA; Only spaceflight	
Flight Engineer 3		Thomas Marshburn, NASA; Second spaceflight
Flight Engineer 4		Chris Hadfield, CSA; Third and last spaceflight
Flight Engineer 5		Roman Romanenko, RSA; Second and last spaceflight

Source
NASA

== Mission objectives ==
Some of the science objectives included investigations of the human cardiovascular system in space, studies on fish and their sensation of gravity, and the impacts of solar radiation on Earth's climate. During the expedition, the robotic platform Robonaut, a humanoid robot test platform, continued testing.
