= Thomas Marshburn =

American physician and astronaut (born 1960)

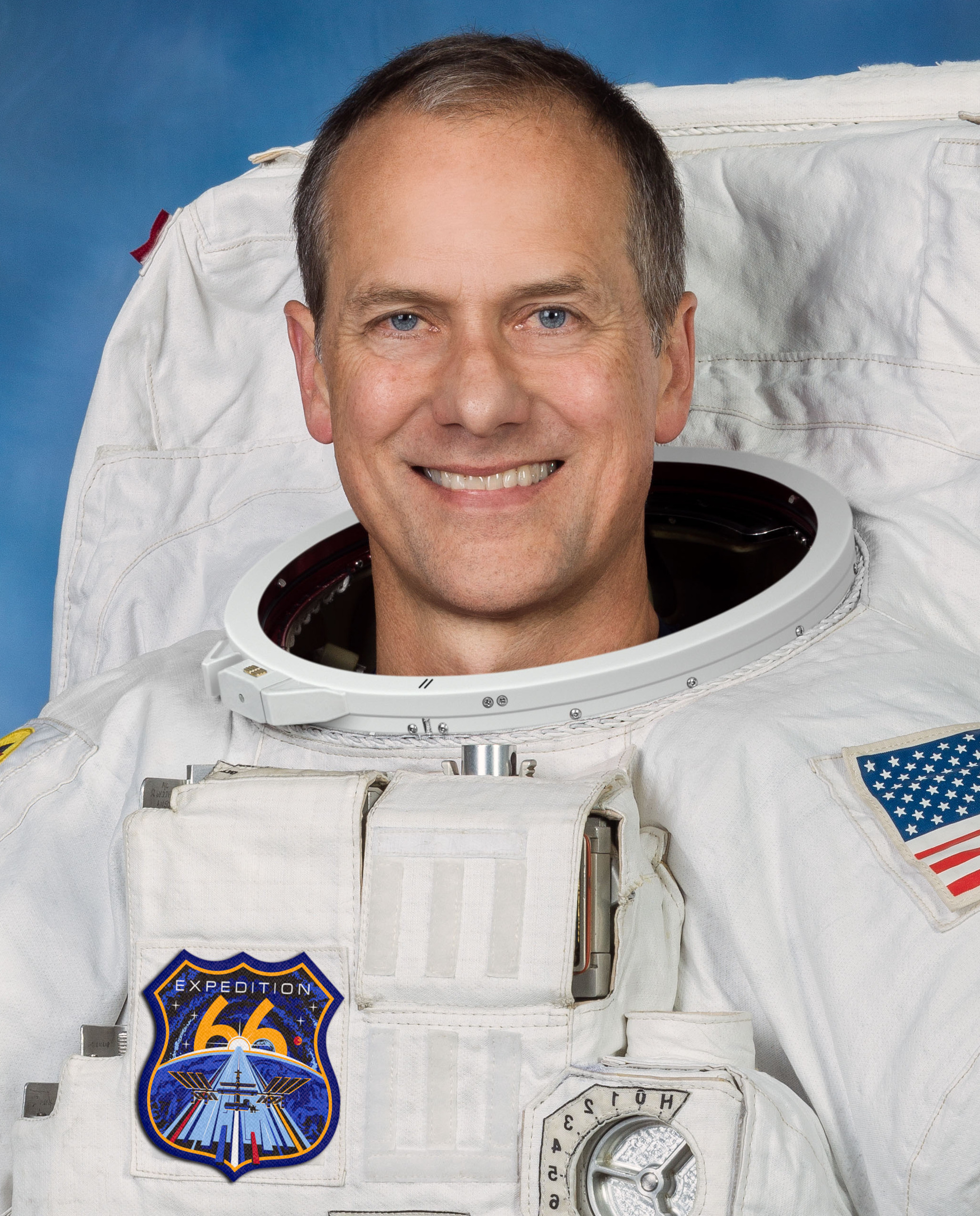
- Official portrait, 2021
- Born: Thomas Henry Marshburn; August 29, 1960 (age 66); Statesville, North Carolina, U.S.
- Education: Davidson College (BS); University of Virginia (MS); Wake Forest University (MD); University of Texas, Galveston (MS)
- Space career

NASA astronaut
- Time in space: 337d 9h 43m
- Selection: NASA Group 19 (2004)
- Total EVAs: 5
- Total EVA time: 31h 1m
- Mission: STS-127; Soyuz TMA-07M (Expedition 34/35); SpaceX Crew-3 (Expedition 66/67)
- Mission insignia
- Retired: December 31, 2022

Thomas Henry Marshburn (born August 29, 1960) is an American physician and a former NASA astronaut. He is a veteran of three spaceflights to the International Space Station and holds the record for the oldest person to perform a spacewalk at 61 years old.

== Education ==
Marshburn was born in Statesville, North Carolina, as the son of Robert Marshburn (1920–1988) and Gladys Marshburn (née Grier) (1923–2013). Marshburn graduated from Henderson High School in Atlanta, Georgia, in 1978. He obtained a Bachelor of Science degree in physics from Davidson College in North Carolina in 1982, and a Master of Science degree in engineering physics from the University of Virginia in 1984. He received a Doctor of Medicine degree from Wake Forest University in 1989, and a Master of Medical Science degree from the University of Texas Medical Branch in 1997. He trained in emergency medicine and worked in emergency rooms in Texas and Massachusetts.

== Special honors and organizations ==
Marshburn's awards include the NASA Superior Achievement award (1998), Space and Life Sciences Division Special Space Flight Achievement Award (2003, 2004) and the Lyndon B. Johnson Space Center Superior Achievement Award (January 2004). Marshburn is a member of the Aircraft Owners and Pilots Association, the American Academy of Emergency Medicine and the Aerospace Medical Association.

== Medical career ==
After completing medical school, Marshburn trained in emergency medicine at the St. Vincent Hospital Emergency Medicine program in Toledo, Ohio, where he also worked as a flight physician. After three years of training, he was certified by the American Board of Emergency Medicine in 1992. He then worked as an emergency physician in Seattle, Washington, before being accepted into the first class of the NASA/UTMB Space Medicine Fellowship in Galveston, Texas. After completing the fellowship in 1995, he worked as an emergency physician in area hospitals in Houston, Texas, and at the Massachusetts General Hospital in Boston, Massachusetts. During this time, he also worked as an attending physician for the emergency medicine residency at The University of Texas Health Science Center at Houston.

== NASA career ==
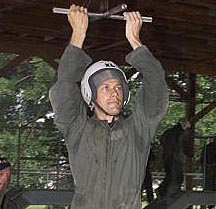
Thomas Marshburn during water survival training at Pensacola Naval Air Station

Marshburn joined NASA in November 1994, serving as a flight surgeon at Johnson Space Center in Houston, Texas. He was assigned to Space Shuttle Medical Operations and to the joint US/Russian Space Program. From February 1996 to May 1997 he served as a flight surgeon for NASA personnel deployed to the Yuri Gagarin Cosmonauts Training Center, Star City, Russia, followed by work in the Center for Flight Control in Korolyov, Russia, in support of the NASA Expedition 4 to the Mir Space Station. From July 1997 to August 1998 he was co-chair of Medical Operations for the Shuttle–Mir Program. From 1998 to 2000, he was deputy Flight Surgeon for Neuronal (STS-98) and lead Flight Surgeon for the STS-101 mission to the International Space Station (ISS).

After spending ten months as a NASA representative to the Harvard/MIT Smart Medical Systems Team of the National Space Biomedical Research Institute in Boston, Massachusetts, he worked as the lead Flight Surgeon for Expedition 7 to the ISS in 2003, supporting from Russia, Kazakhstan and Houston. Until he was selected as an astronaut candidate, Marshburn served as Medical Operations Lead for the ISS. His activities included development of the biomedical training program for flight surgeons and astronaut crew medical officers, and managing the ISS Health Maintenance System.

Marshburn was selected in May 2004 to be a NASA astronaut. He completed his Astronaut Candidate Training in February 2006. This included scientific and technical briefings, intensive instruction in Shuttle and International Space Station systems, physiological training, T-38 flight training and water and wilderness survival training. He was qualified for various technical assignments within the Astronaut Office and future flight assignments as a mission specialist.

In May 2010, Marshburn served as an aquanaut during the NEEMO 14 mission aboard the Aquarius underwater laboratory, living and working underwater for fourteen days.

In 2019, he served as a backup flight engineer for the Soyuz MS-13 and Soyuz MS-15 long-duration flights to the ISS, first backing up Italian astronaut Luca Parmitano, and the American-Swedish astronaut Jessica Meir.

=== STS-127 ===
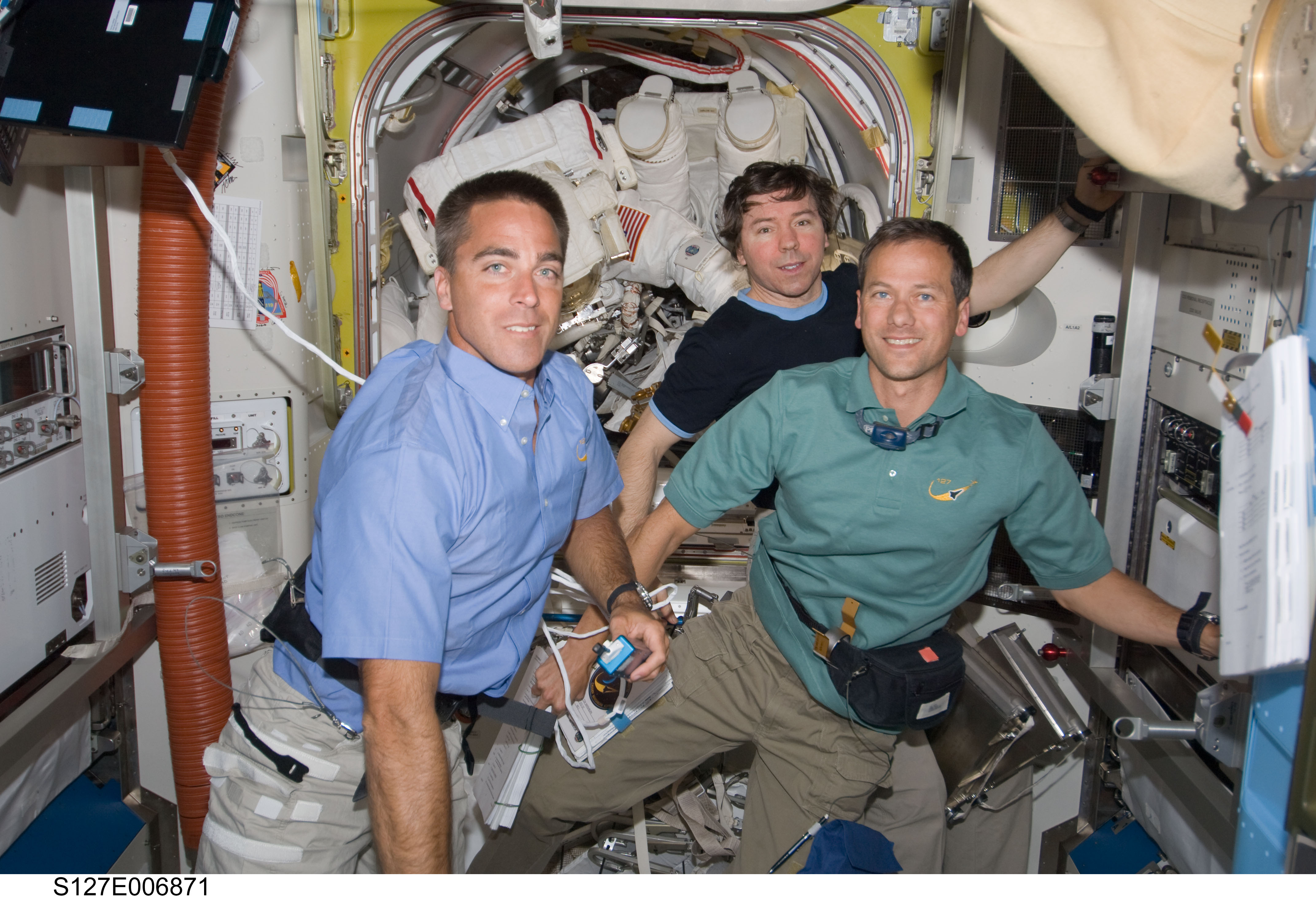
Marshburn (far right) pictured on the ISS during STS-127

Marshburn's first flight was on STS-127, which lifted off on July 15, 2009, at 6:03 p.m. EDT and landed on July 31, 2009. The mission delivered the Japanese-built Exposed Facility (JEM-EF) and the Experiment Logistics Module Exposed Section (ELM-ES) to the International Space Station. Marshburn took part in three spacewalks during the mission.

=== Expedition 34/35 ===
Marshburn served as a flight engineer on Expedition 34/35 to the International Space Station, launching aboard Soyuz TMA-07M on December 19, 2012, from the Baikonur Cosmodrome in Kazakhstan, along with crew members Chris Hadfield of the Canadian Space Agency and Russian cosmonaut Roman Romanenko. The crew was welcomed aboard the ISS by Expedition 34 commander Kevin A. Ford and cosmonauts Evgeny Tarelkin and Oleg Novitskiy. On May 11, 2013, Marshburn and Expedition 35 flight engineer Christopher Cassidy performed an unplanned spacewalk to replace a pump controller box suspected to be the source of an ammonia coolant leak. Marshburn and his crew returned to Earth on May 13, 2013.

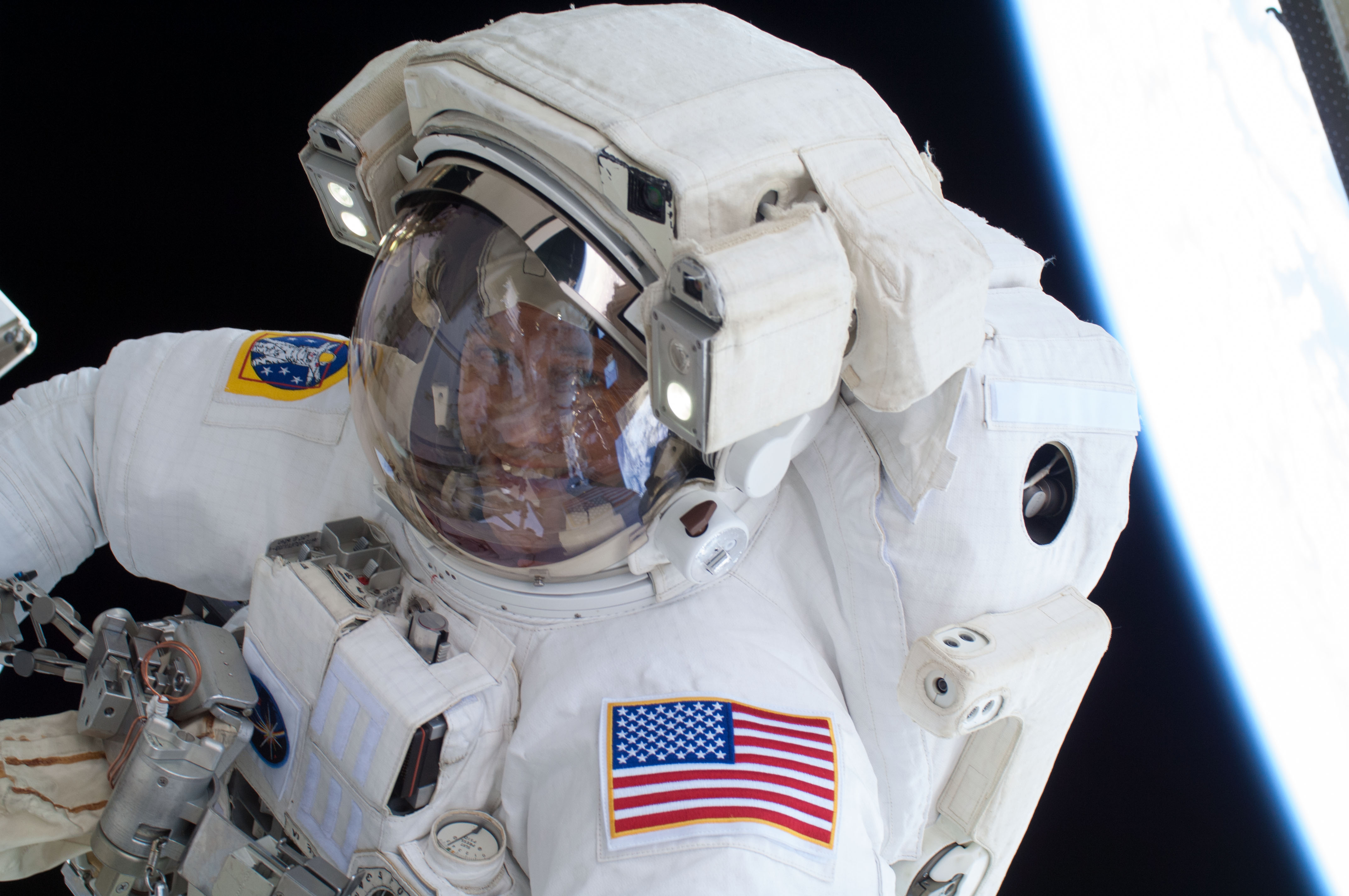
Marshburn pictured during EVA with Chris Cassidy

=== SpaceX Crew-3 ===
On November 11, 2021, Marshburn launched on the SpaceX Crew-3 spaceflight as part of the long duration Expedition 66 mission onboard the ISS. He performed his fifth EVA with fellow astronaut Kayla Barron on the exterior of the ISS shortly after the mission had begun. He took over command of the ISS from Anton Shkaplerov on March 29. After the arrival of Crew-4 and the transfer of command to Oleg Artemyev, Crew-3 landed on May 6, 2022 after 177 days in space.

== Post-NASA career ==
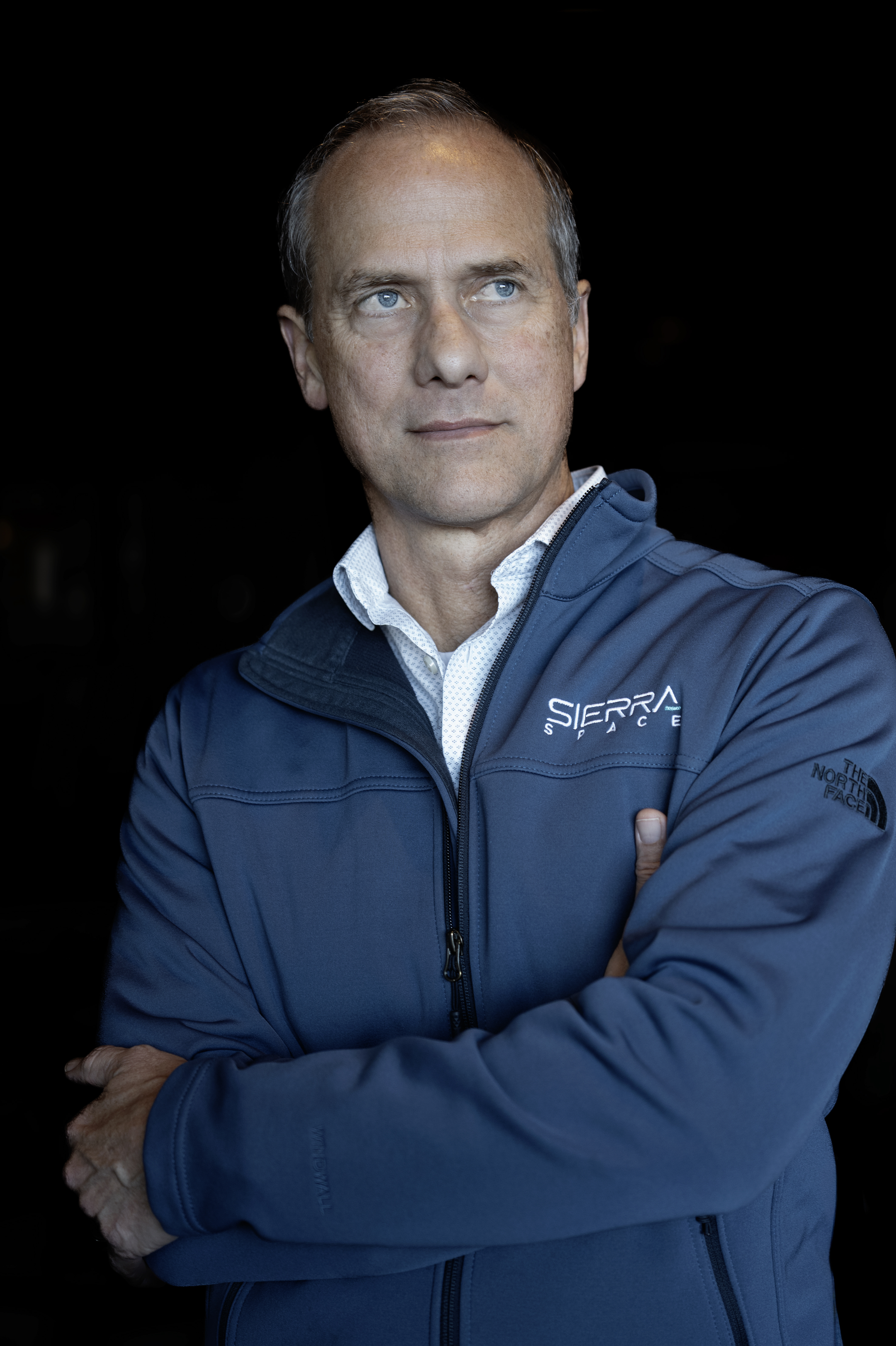
Thomas Marshburn in 2025

After leaving NASA, Marshburn joined Sierra Space in late 2022 as the Chief Medical Officer in the company's Human Spaceflight Center and Astronaut Training Academy.

Preceded by Anton Shkaplerov	ISS Commander (Expedition 67); 29 March to 4 May 2022	Succeeded by Oleg Artemyev
