= Soyuz TMA-07M =

2012 Russian crewed spaceflight to the ISS

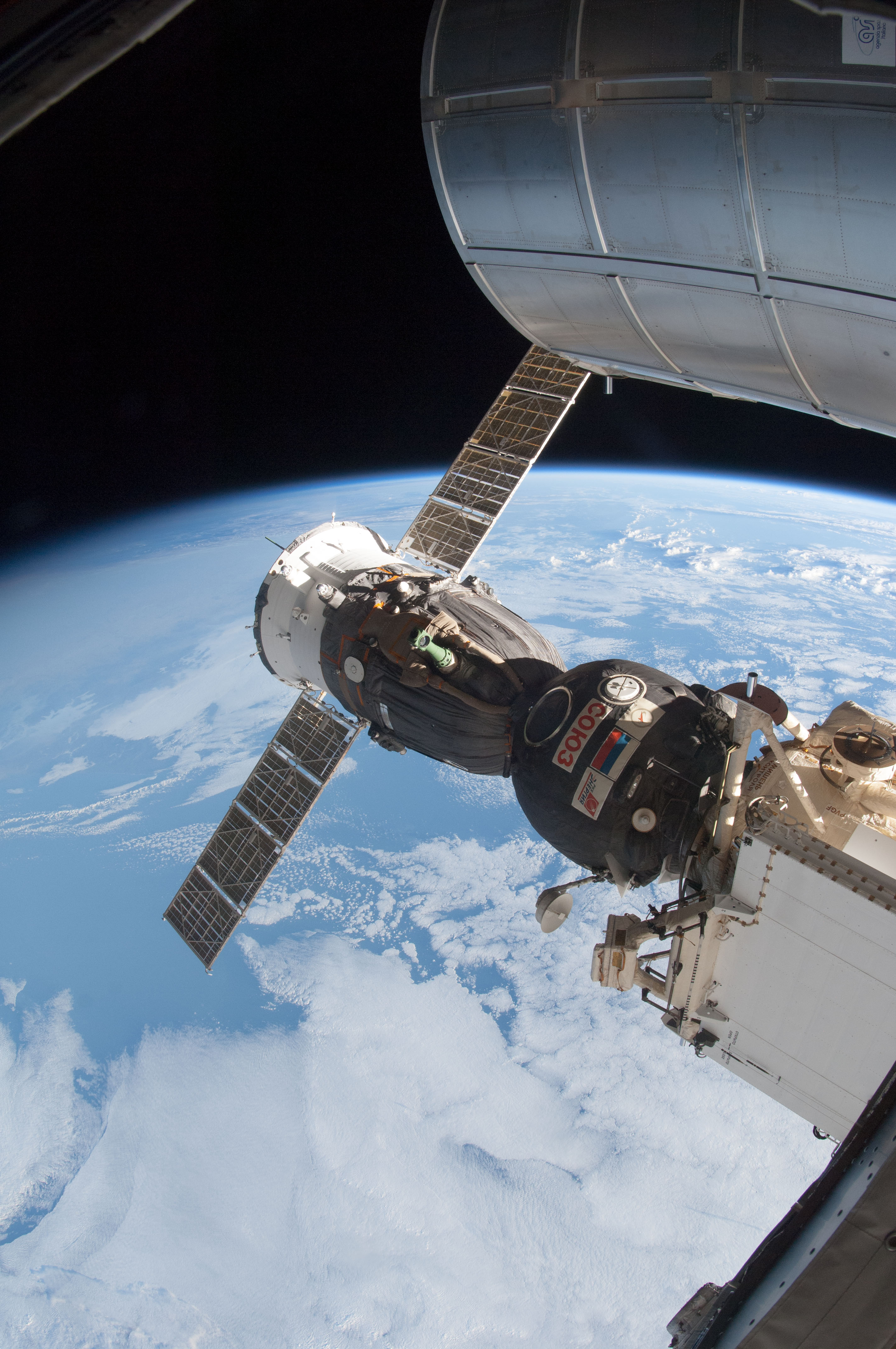
- Soyuz TMA-07M docked to the Rassvet module of the ISS
- Mission type: ISS crew rotation
- Operator: Roscosmos
- COSPAR ID: 2012-074A
- SATCAT no.: 39032
- Mission duration: 145 days, 14 hours, 19 minutes

Spacecraft properties
- Spacecraft: Soyuz 11F732A47 No.704A
- Spacecraft type: Soyuz-TMA
- Manufacturer: RKK Energia

Crew
- Crew size: 3
- Members: Roman Romanenko; Chris Hadfield; Thomas Marshburn
- Callsign: Парус ("Sail")

Start of mission
- Launch date: 19 December 2012, 12:12:36 UTC
- Rocket: Soyuz-FG
- Launch site: Baikonur 1/5

End of mission
- Landing date: 14 May 2013, 02:31 UTC

Orbital parameters
- Reference system: Geocentric
- Regime: Low Earth

Docking with ISS
- Docking port: Rassvet nadir
- Docking date: 21 December 2012, 14:09 UTC
- Undocking date: 13 May 2013, 23:08 UTC
- Time docked: 143 days, 9 hours
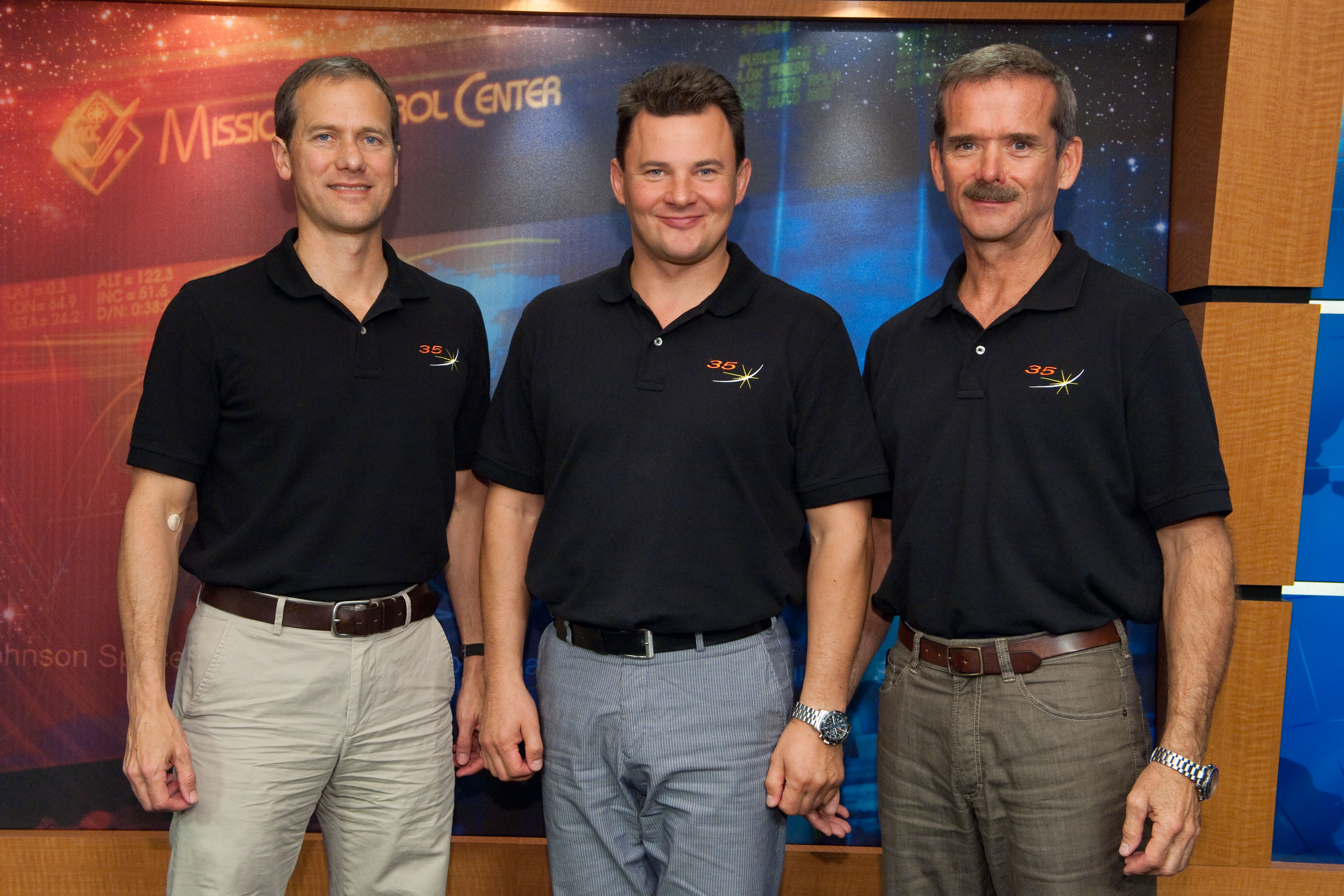
- (l-r) Marshburn, Romanenko and Hadfield Soyuz programme (Crewed missions)

Soyuz TMA-07M (Russian: Союз ТМА-07M) was a spaceflight launched to the International Space Station in 2012 which transported three members of the Expedition 34 crew to the station. The Soyuz remained docked to the space station and served as an emergency escape vehicle for the Expedition 35 increment, before returning its crew to Earth in May 2013.

== Crew ==
Position	Crew Member
Commander	(Russia) Roman Romanenko, Roscosmos; Expedition 34; Second and last spaceflight
Flight Engineer 1	(Canada) Chris Hadfield, CSA; Expedition 34; Third and last spaceflight
Flight Engineer 2	(United States) Thomas Marshburn, NASA; Expedition 34; Second spaceflight

=== Backup crew ===
Position	Crew Member
Commander	(Russia) Fyodor Yurchikhin, Roscosmos
Flight Engineer 1	(Italy) Luca Parmitano, ESA
Flight Engineer 2	(United States) Karen L. Nyberg, NASA

== Launch ==
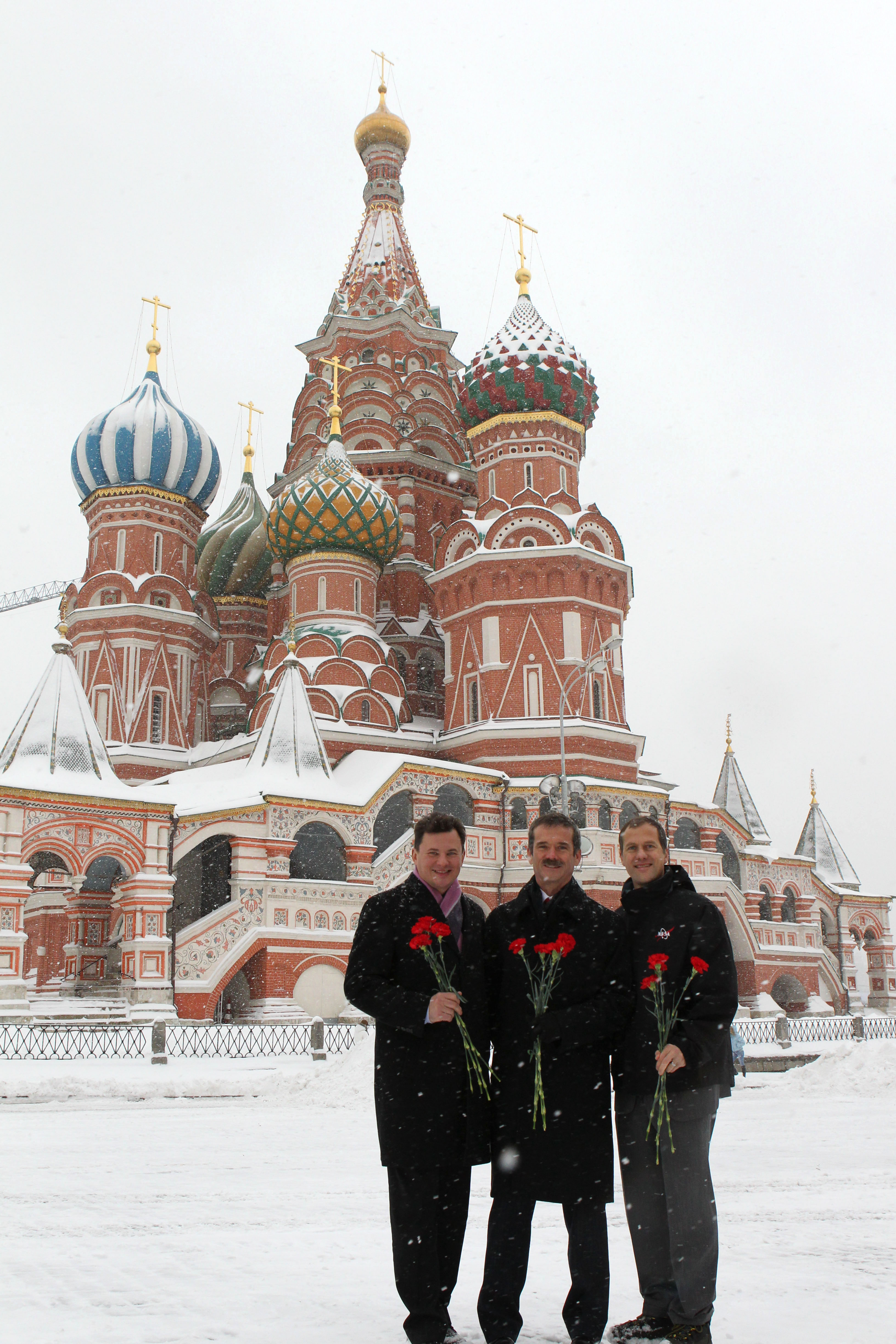
The Soyuz TMA-07M crew members conduct their ceremonial tour of Red Square on 29 November 2012.

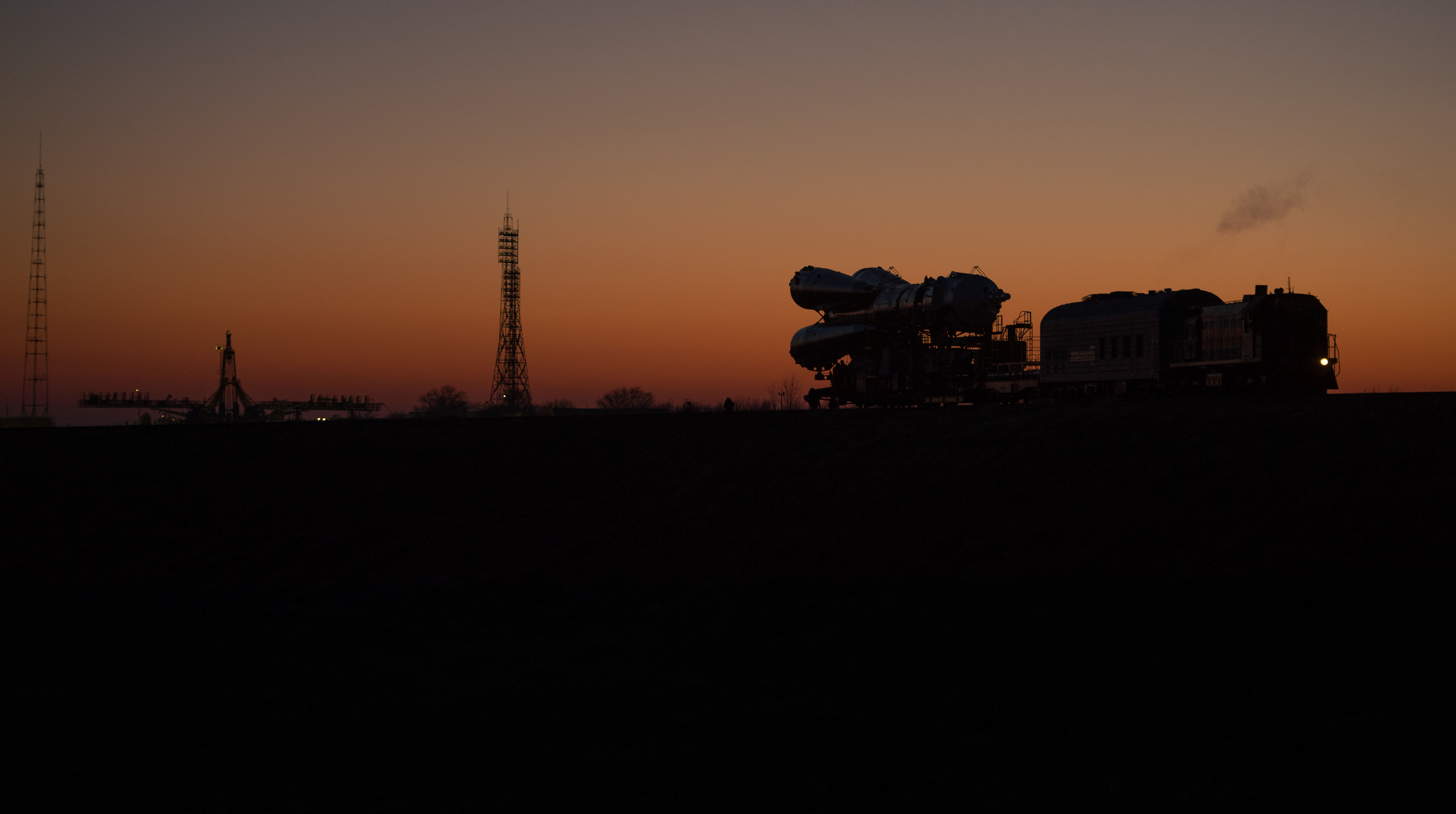
The spacecraft being transported to the launch site on 17 December 2012.

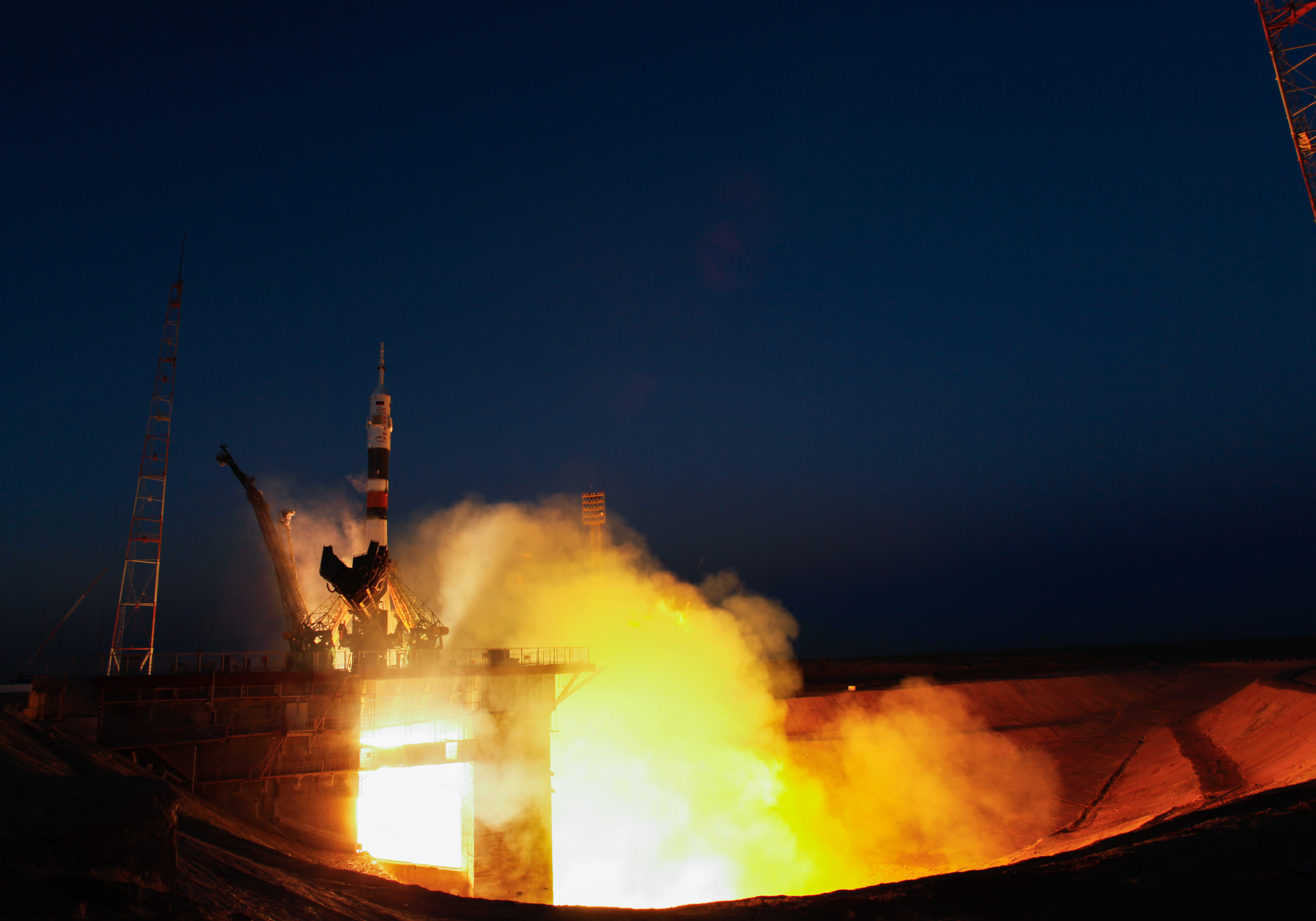
The TMA-07M spacecraft launches to the ISS on 19 December 2012.

The Soyuz FG rocket was rolled out to Site 1/5 at the Baikonur Cosmodrome on 17 December. The pre-dawn roll-out was done under freezing conditions with temperatures dropping as low as –30 °C. Preparations were completed during the two days leading up to the launch. The Soyuz TMA-07M launch was the first to take place from Site 1/5 after modifications were completed. The Soyuz TMA-06M launch before that took place from Site 31/6.

The countdown operations started early on 19 December about eight hours before the planned launch time. The crew enjoyed their final breakfast and participated in the traditional pre-flight blessing by a Russian Orthodox Priest. Later, Romanenko, Hadfield and Marshburn departed the cosmonaut hotel to head to Site 254 where they began operations to don their Sokol launch and entry suits four hours and twenty minutes ahead of launch. The crew arrived at the launch site about two hours and 33 minutes before lift-off. As Soyuz commander, Romanenko occupied the center seat, while Hadfield and Marshburn were strapped into the left and right seats respectively.

The Soyuz FG rocket carrying Soyuz TMA-07M was launched on 19 December 2012 at 12:12:35 UTC from Site 1/5 of the Baikonur Cosmodrome in freezing weather conditions. Two minutes and 35 seconds after launch, the launch escape system and payload shroud were jettisoned. The core stage continued to burn until it was shut down at the 4-minute 45-second mark. The third stage ignited two seconds later and continued to burn for another 3 minutes and 57 seconds to propel the Soyuz TMA-07M spacecraft into orbit. The Soyuz targeted a 200-by-242-kilometre (124 by 150 mi) orbit with an inclination of 51.67 degrees. Upon reaching orbit, the spacecraft deployed its solar arrays and communication antennas.

== Docking ==
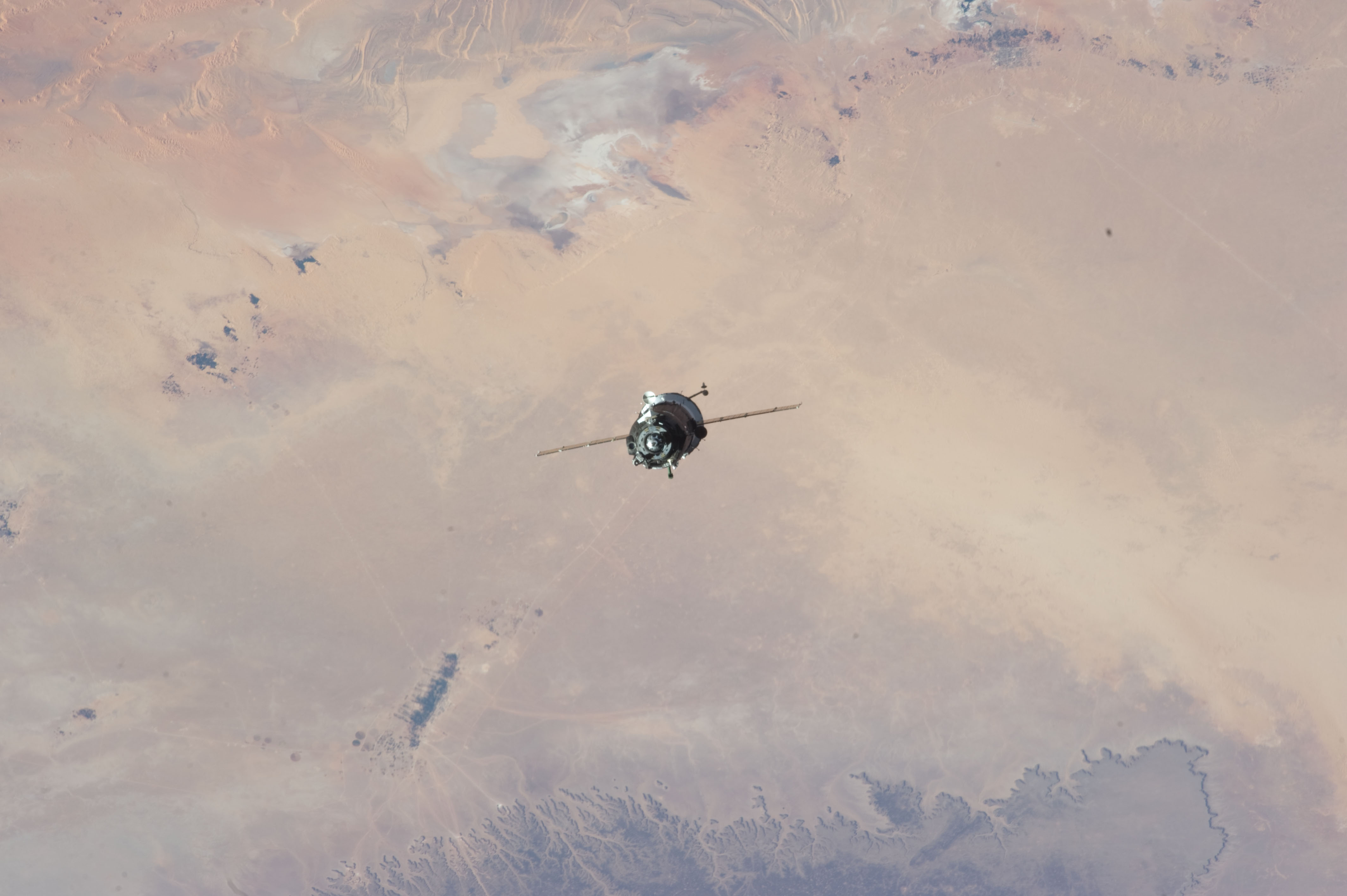
The Soyuz TMA-07M spacecraft approaches the ISS on 21 December 2012.

After the successful orbit insertion, Soyuz TMA-07M followed the 34 orbit rendezvous profile to catch up with the International Space Station. The spacecraft performed a number of orbit adjustments through a set of burns. The first two burns took place on Flight Day 1. A third minor phasing maneuver was performed on the next day. The first three burns changed the spacecraft's velocity by 29, 25 and 2 meters per second, respectively.

The docking sequence began at 11:51 UTC on 21 December. Fifteen minutes after the docking sequence started, a fourth large rendezvous burn (Δv = 23.8 metres per second (78 ft/s)) was performed to further increase the orbital altitude of the Soyuz spacecraft. The ISS also performed its maneuver to the proper docking attitude. The activation of the KURS-A Navigation System on the ISS and the KURS-P System on the Soyuz TMA-07M occurred at 12:37 UTC and 12:39 UTC respectively to provide accurate range and velocity data for the spacecraft's on-board computers. The rendezvous and docking sequence was fully automated, however, Romanenko and Russian Mission Controllers were monitoring the systems to take control in case of an anomaly.

At 13:50 UTC the Soyuz reached a distance of 400 metres (1,300 ft) from the space station, and the crew received a go for the flyaround maneuver which took the spacecraft on a slow lap around the ISS to align itself with the Rassvet module's nadir docking port. When the seven-minute flyaround was complete, Soyuz TMA-07M initiated a short period of stationkeeping at a distance of 190 metres (620 ft). While holding at that range, mission controllers assessed the systems of the vehicle and checked its alignment with the Rassvet docking target. The final approach was initiated at 13:58 UTC and the Soyuz started to close in on the ISS.

Docking of Soyuz TMA-07M to the Space Station occurred at 14:09 UTC while the two were flying over northern Kazakhstan. Docking was three minutes early due to the spacecraft stationkeeping for less time than had been planned.

== Return to Earth ==
Soyuz TMA-07M undocked from the ISS on 13 May 2013 at 23:08 UTC, carrying Hadfield, Marshburn and Romanenko. The capsule landed safely in Kazakhstan on 14 May 2013 at 02:31 UTC.

== Spacecraft location ==
The Soyuz TMA-07M descent capsule is currently on display in Uglegorsk, in the Russian Far East.

== Gallery ==
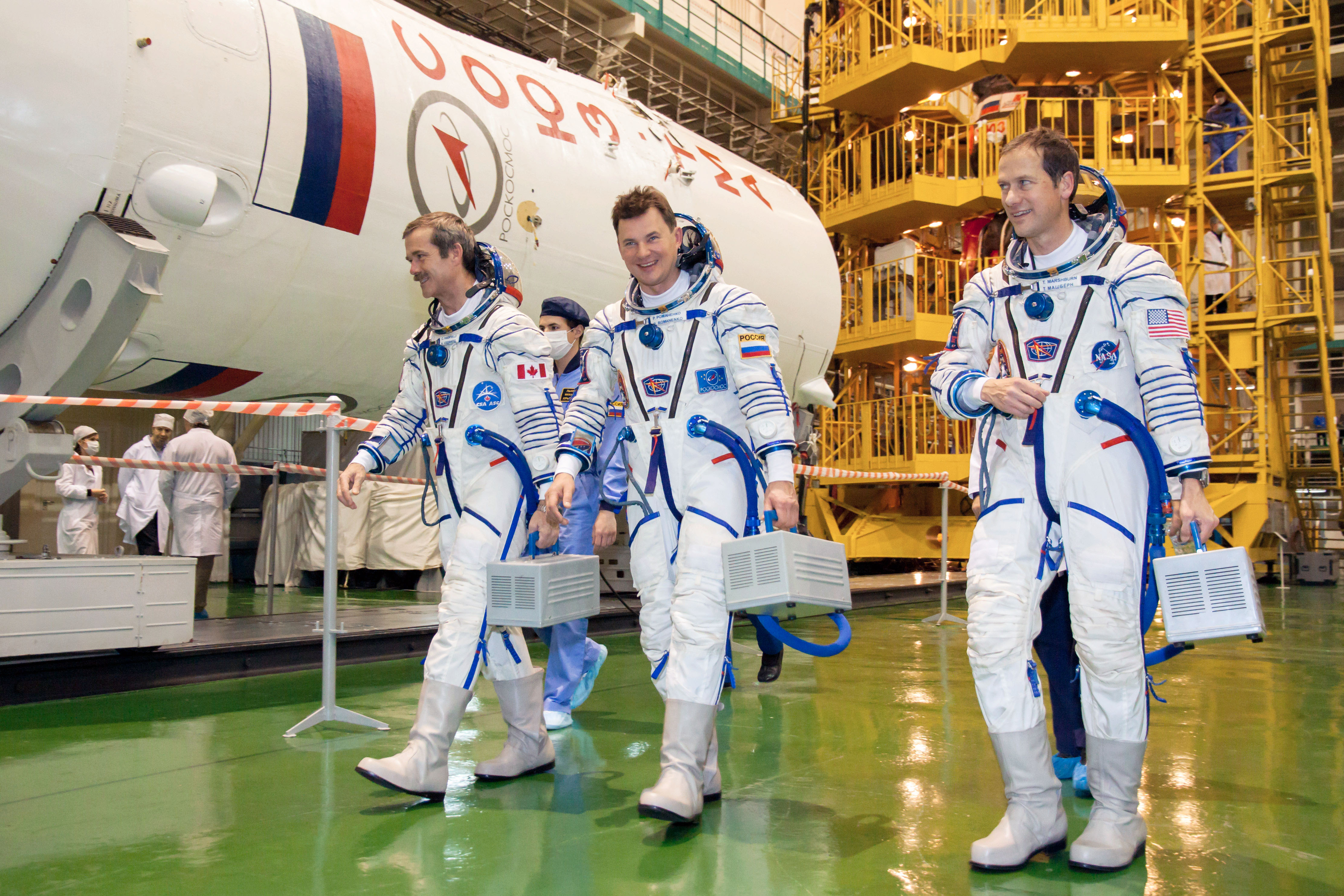
Crew members during a suited "fit check" of the Soyuz TMA-07M spacecraft at the Baikonur Cosmodrome.

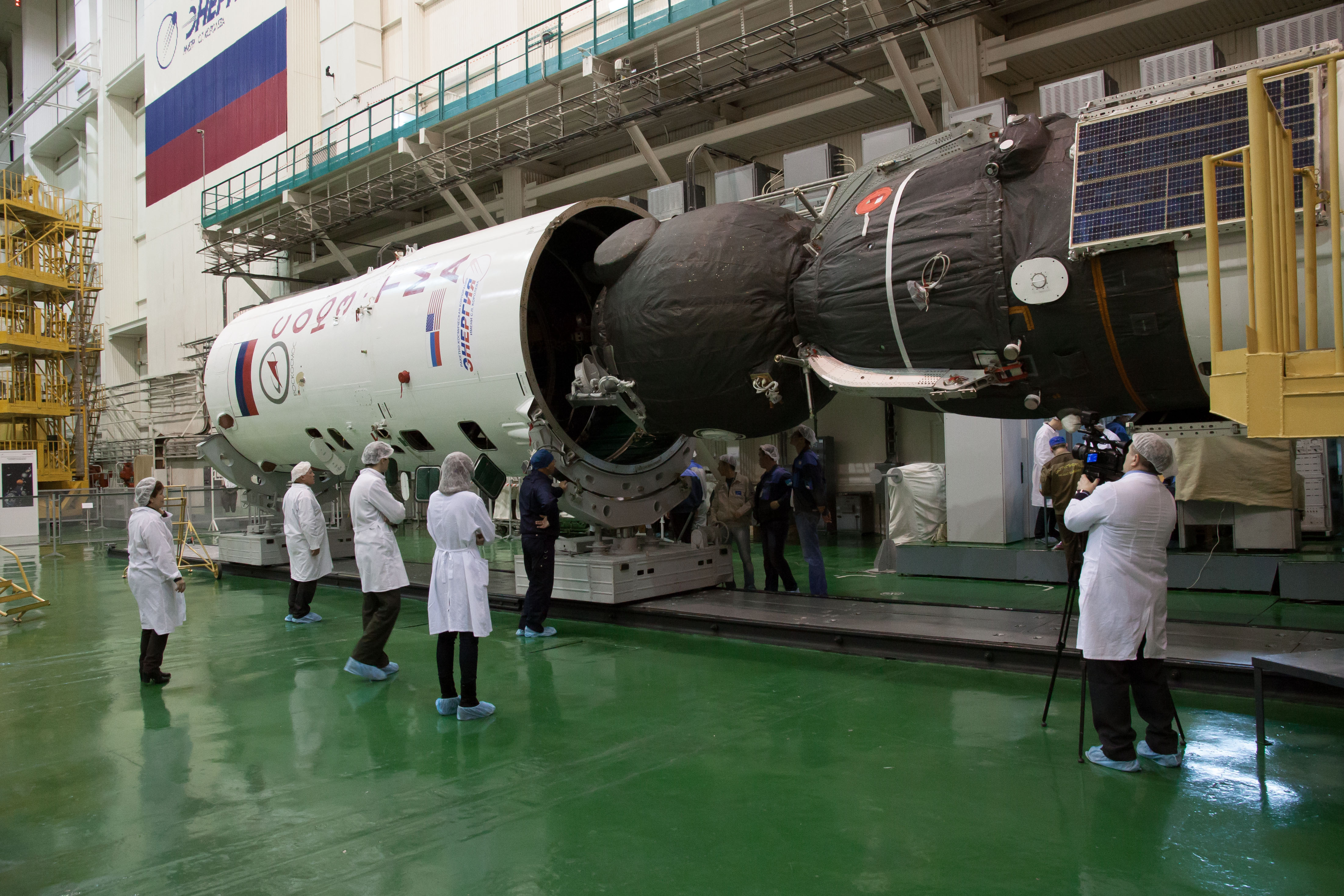
The spacecraft during pre-launch processing on 12 December 2012.

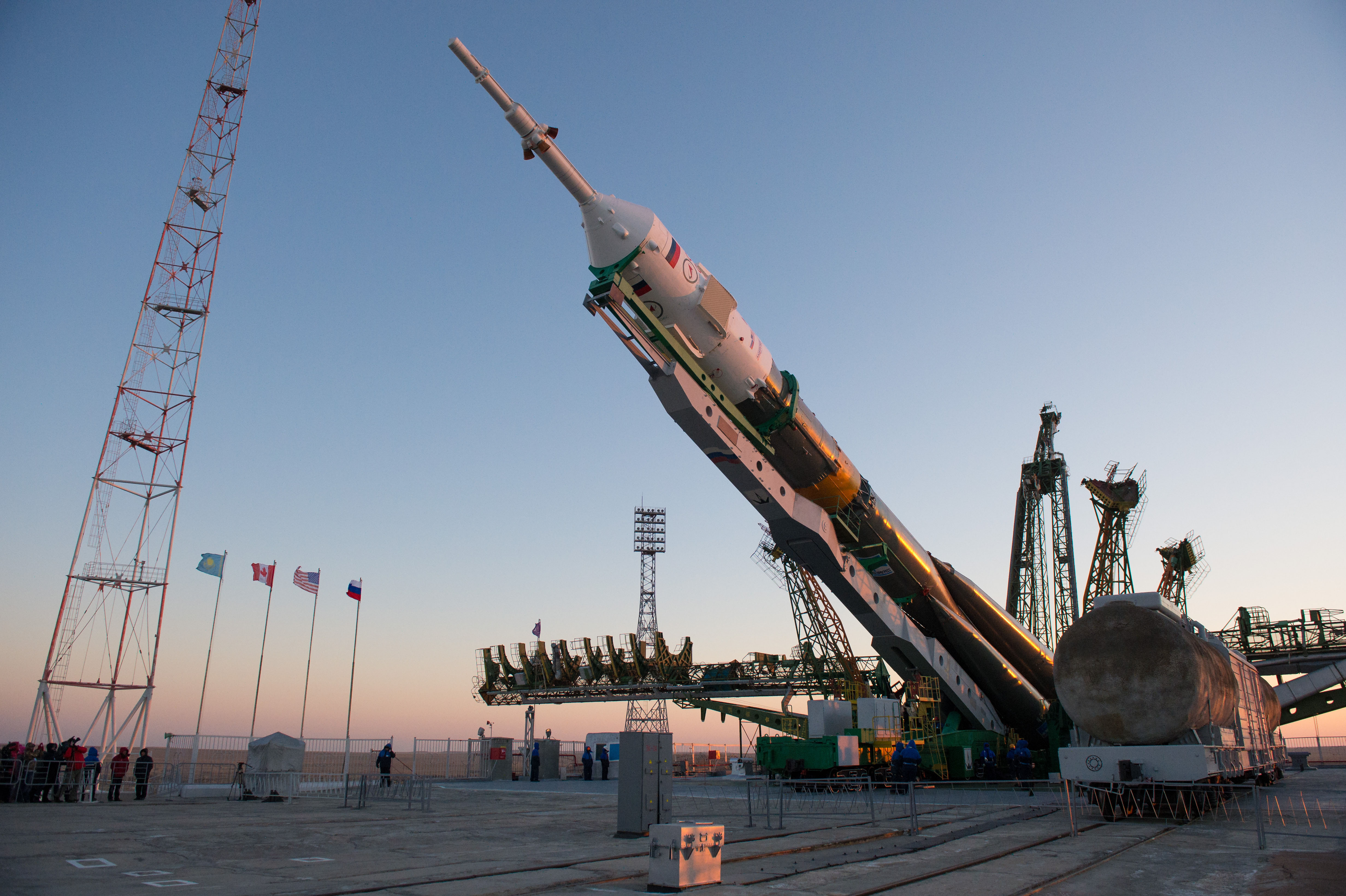
The Soyuz rocket erection on 17 December 2012.

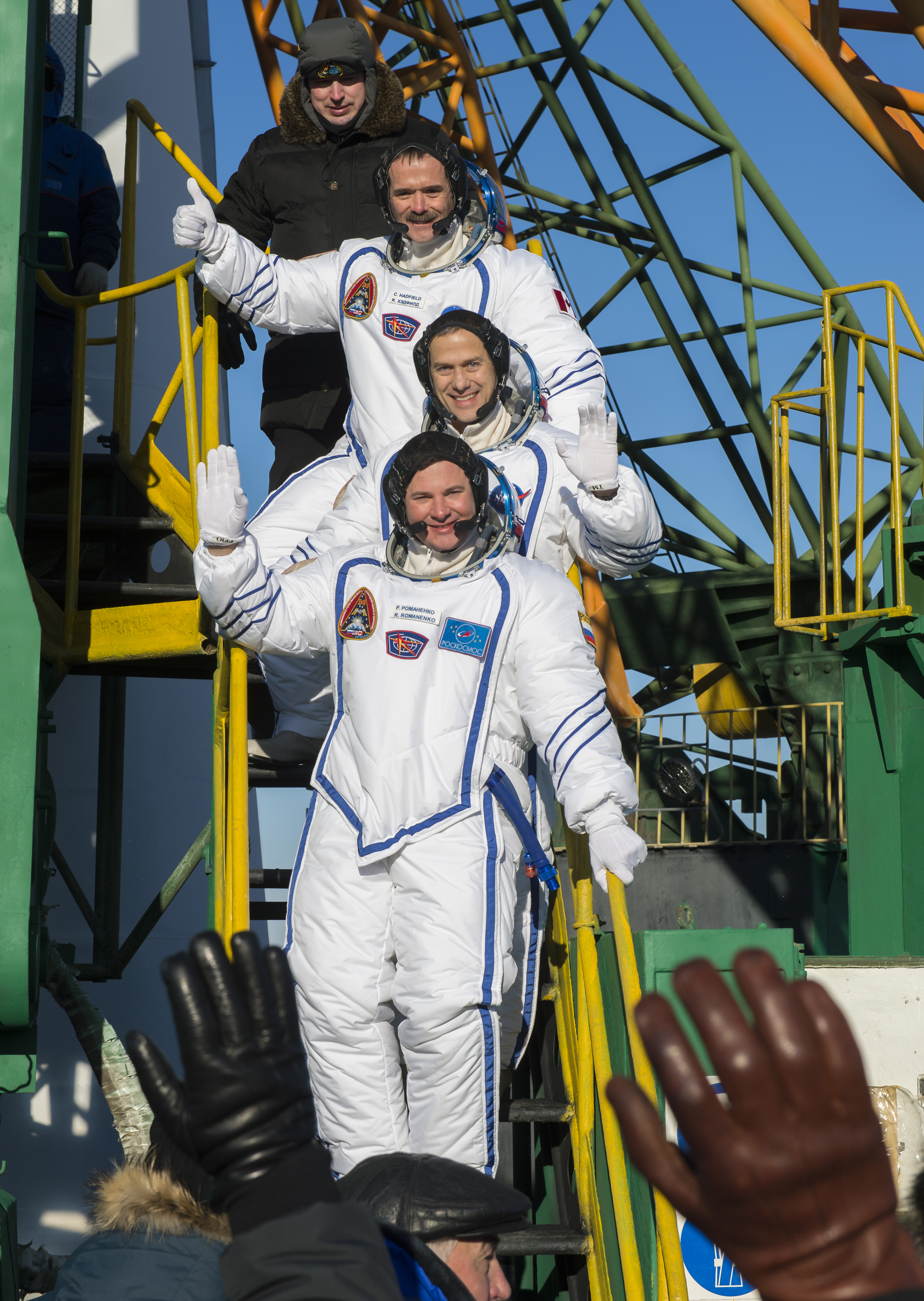
The TMA-07M crew wave to spectators before launch on 19 December 2012.

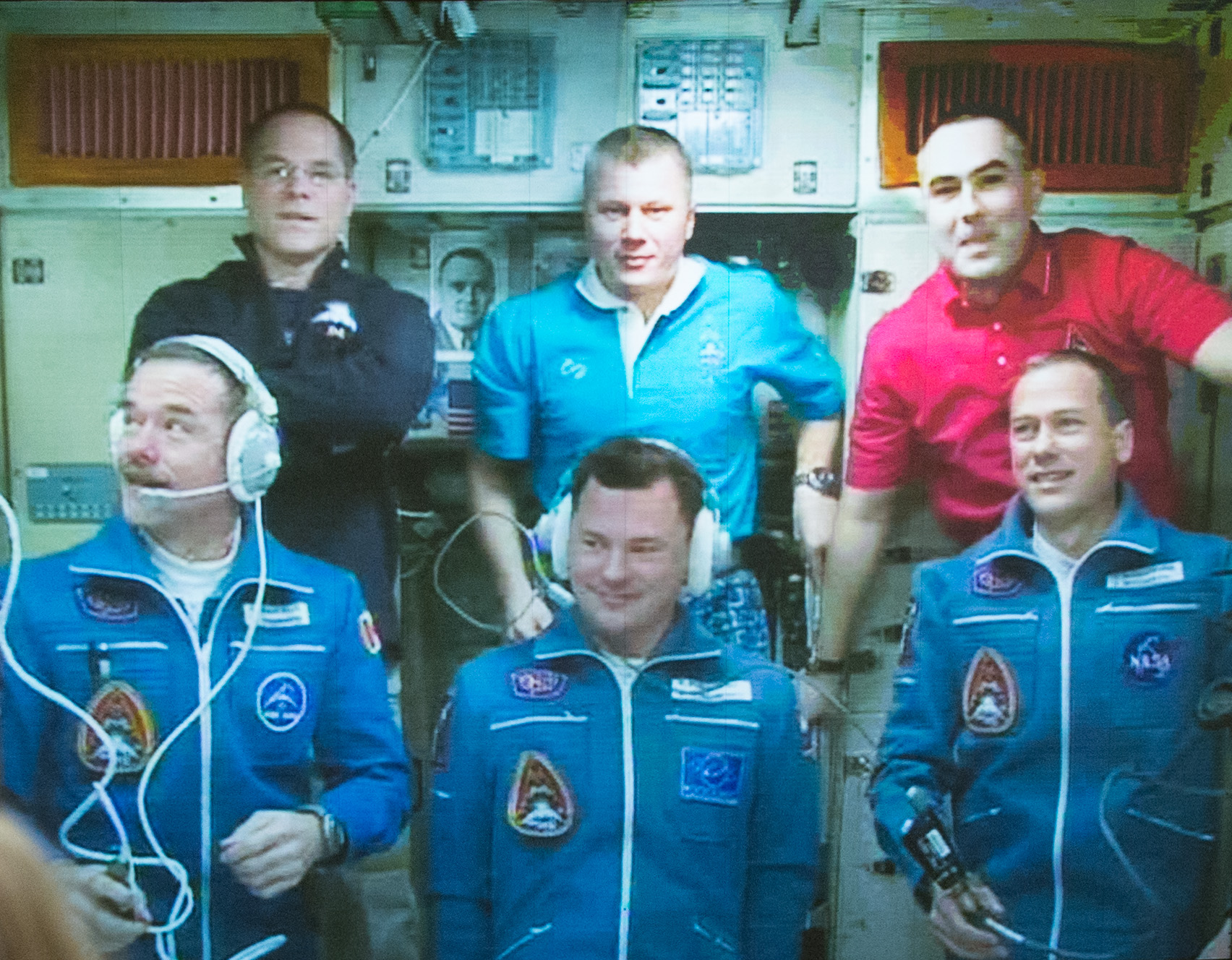
The joined Expedition 34 crew.

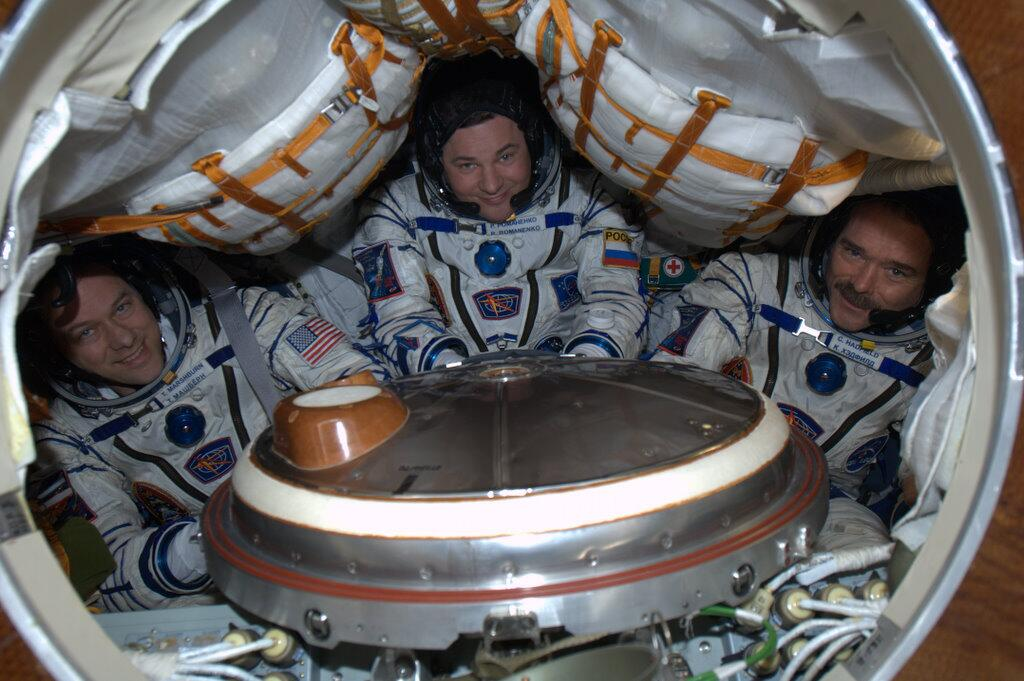
Expedition 35 inside Soyuz TMA-07.

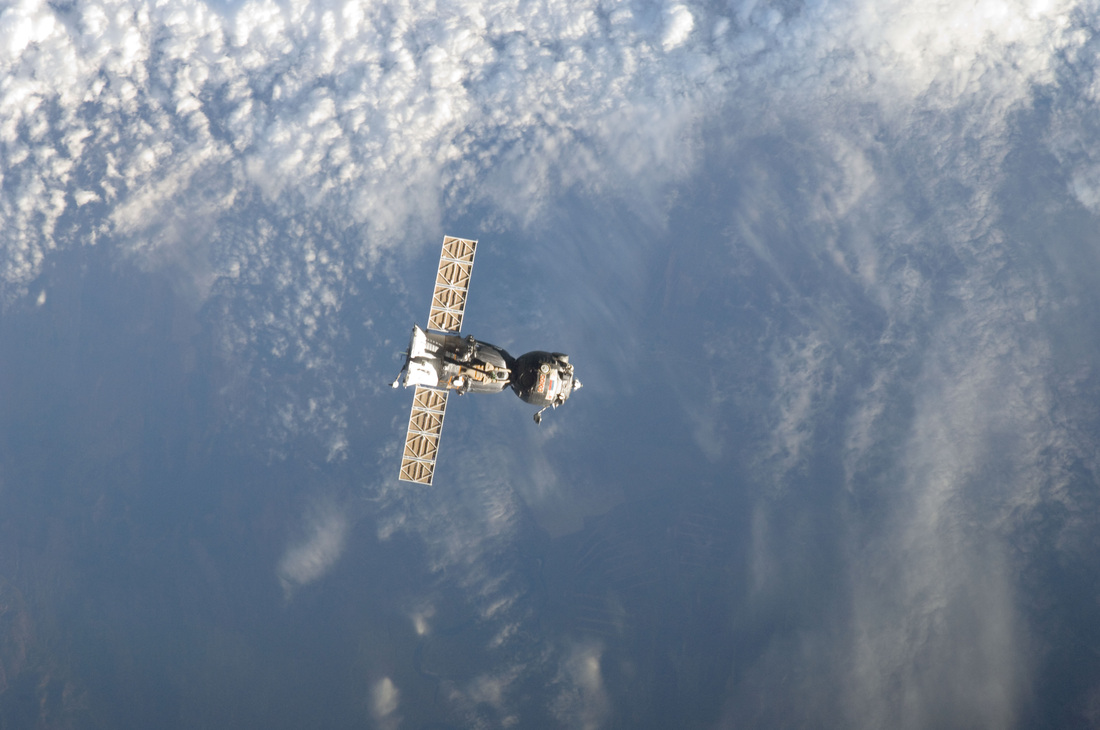
Soyuz TMA-07M Undocking from the ISS.

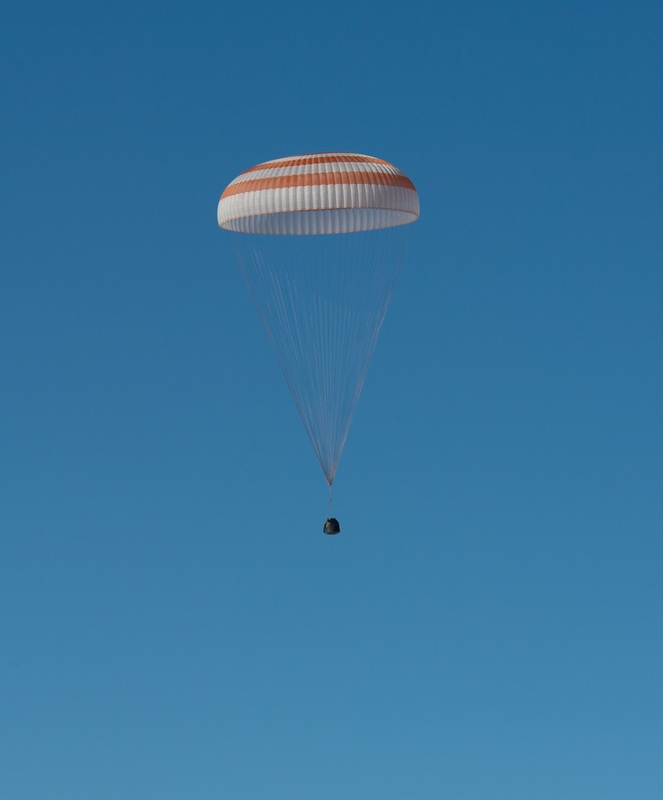
Soyuz TMA-07M descending with its main parachute deployed.

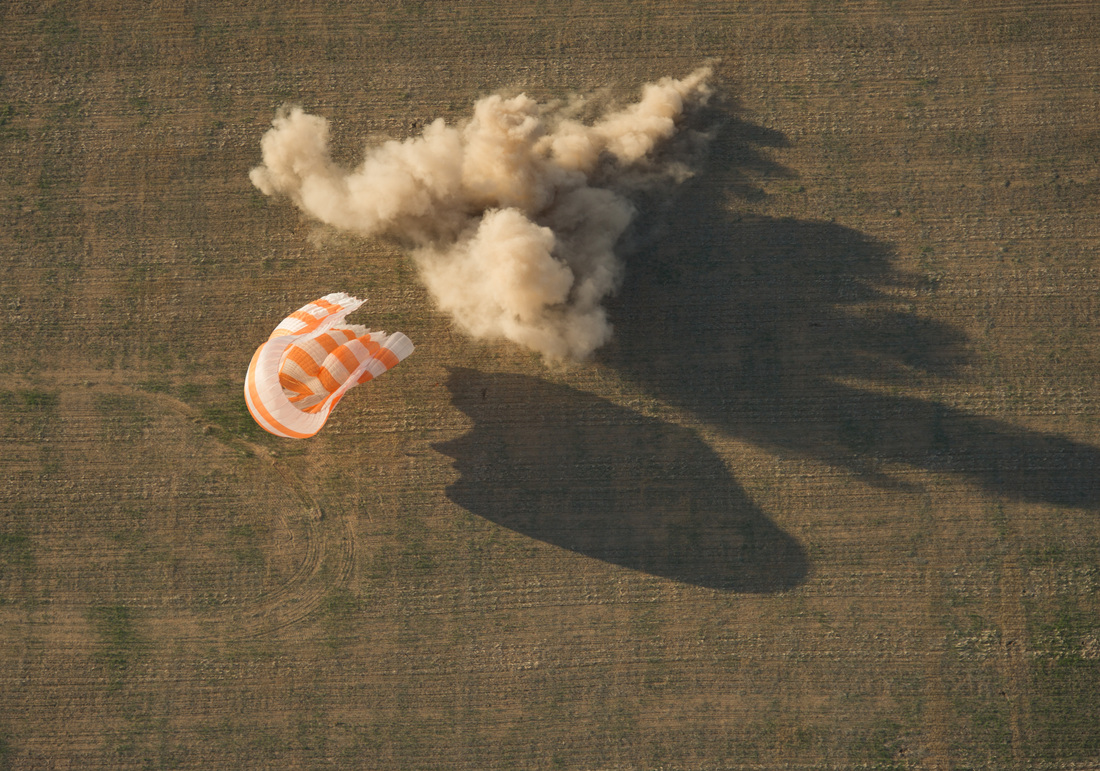
Soyuz TMA-07M touchdown.

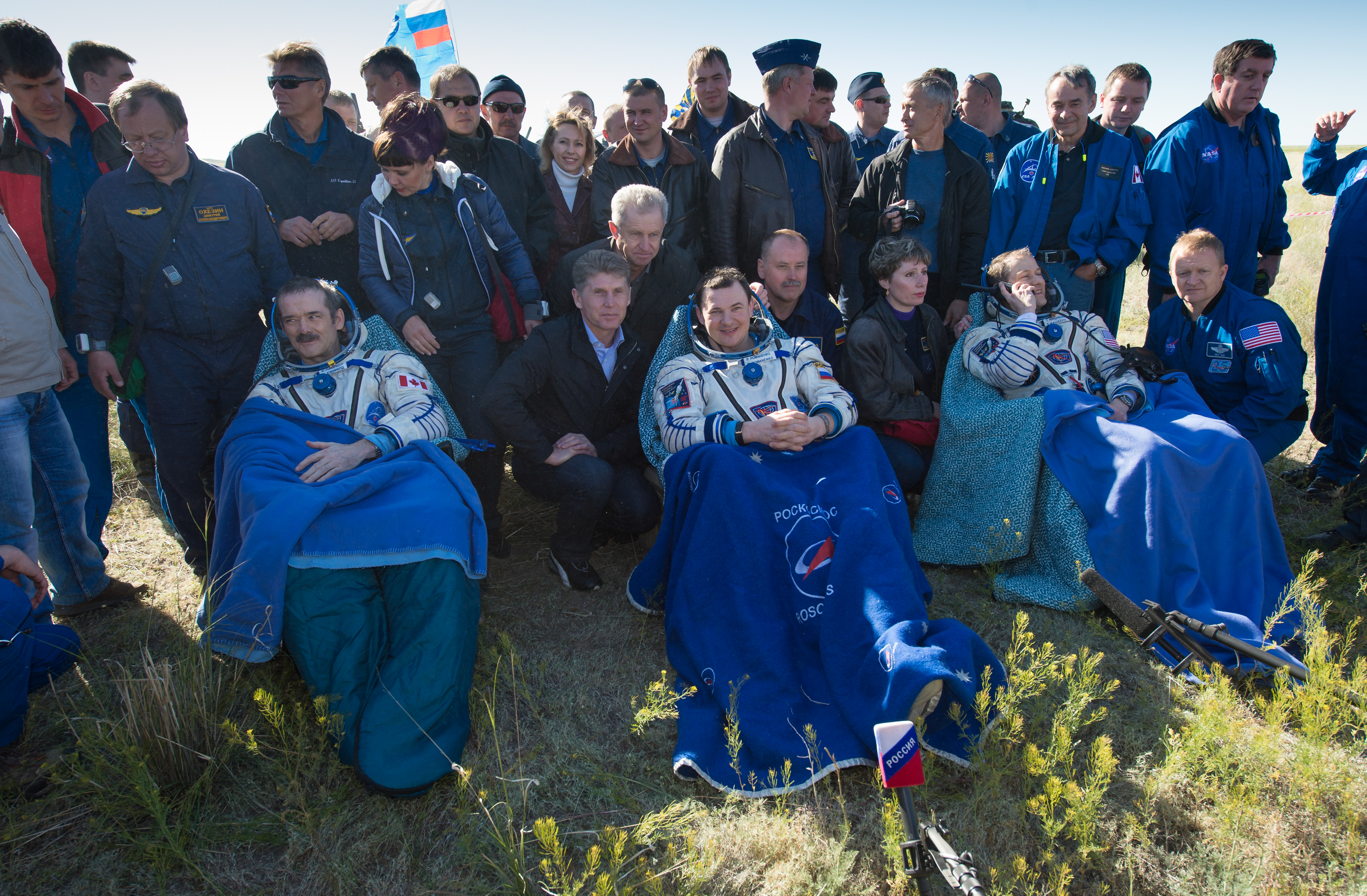
The TMA-07 crew on the ground.
