= Yevgeny Tarelkin =

Russian cosmonaut (born 1974)

Evgeny Tarelkin Hero of the Russian Federation Pilot-Cosmonaut of the Russian Federation
- Евгений Тарелкин
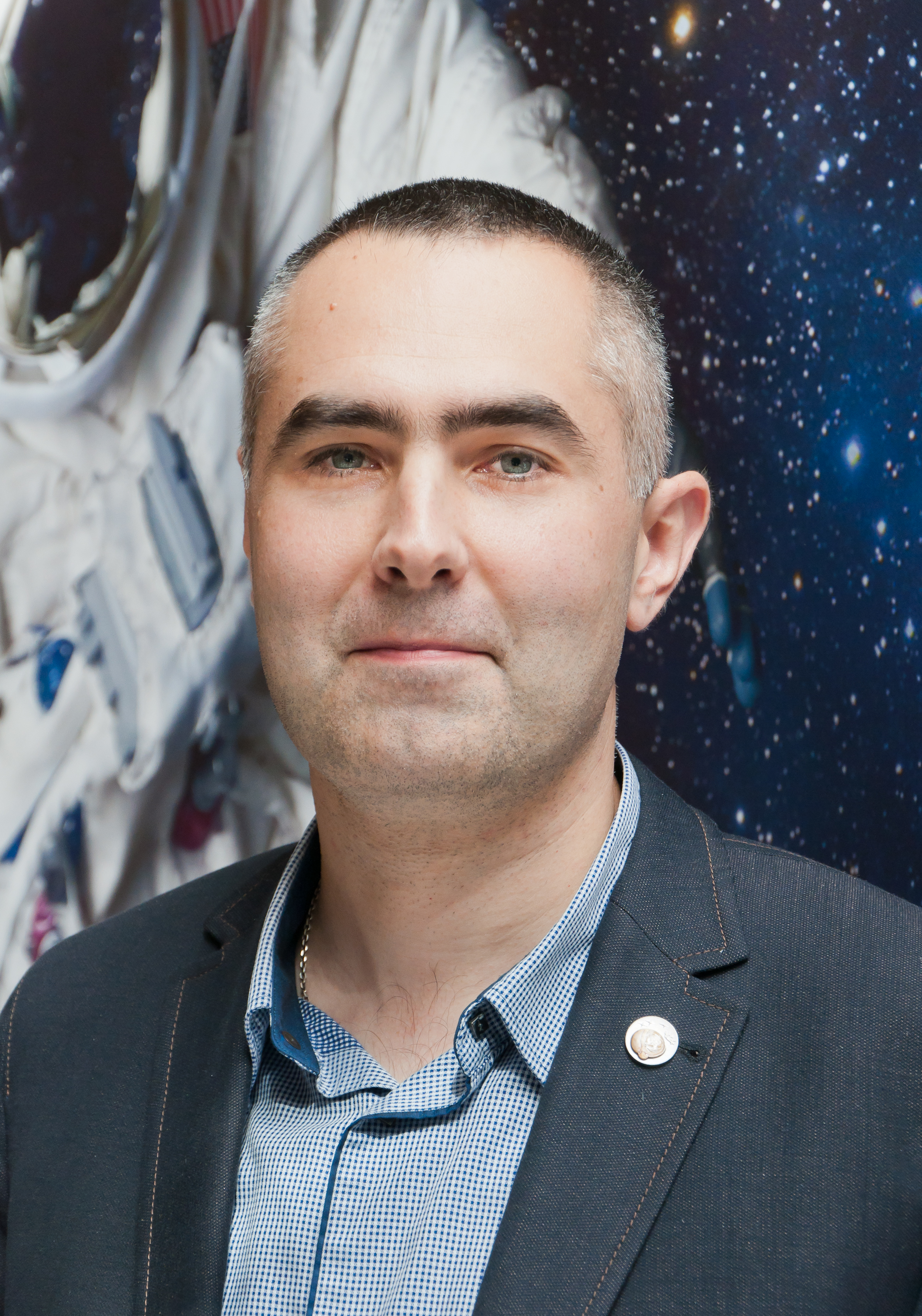
- Born: December 29, 1974 (age 51); Chita Oblast, Russian SFSR, Soviet Union
- Occupation: Pilot
- Space career

Roscosmos cosmonaut
- Status: Retired
- Rank: Captain, Russian Air Force
- Time in space: 143 days 16 hours 15 minutes
- Selection: 2003 TsPK-13 Cosmonaut Group
- Missions: Soyuz TMA-06M (Expedition 33/34)
- Mission insignia
- Retired: June 1, 2015

Evgeny Igorevich Tarelkin (Russian: Евгений Игоревич Тарелкин; born December 29, 1974) is a former Russian cosmonaut. He was selected as part of the TsPK-13 group in 2003.

== Education ==
Tarelkin graduated from the Yeysk Air Force School in 1996 and the Gagarin Air Force Academy in 1998 before rising to the rank of Captain in the Russian Air Force.

== Cosmonaut career ==
He served in the Air Force until his selection as a cosmonaut as part of the TsPK-13 selection group in 2003, completing basic training in 2005. Tarelkin made his first flight into space in October 2012 as a member of the Soyuz TMA-06M crew, during which he spent six months aboard the International Space Station as part of the Expedition 33/34 crews and returned on March 16, 2013. This was his only spaceflight.

In 2019, he is crew commander in the SIRIUS-19 ground based experiment.

== See also ==
- List of Heroes of the Russian Federation
