= Kevin A. Ford =

American astronaut (born 1960)

Kevin Ford
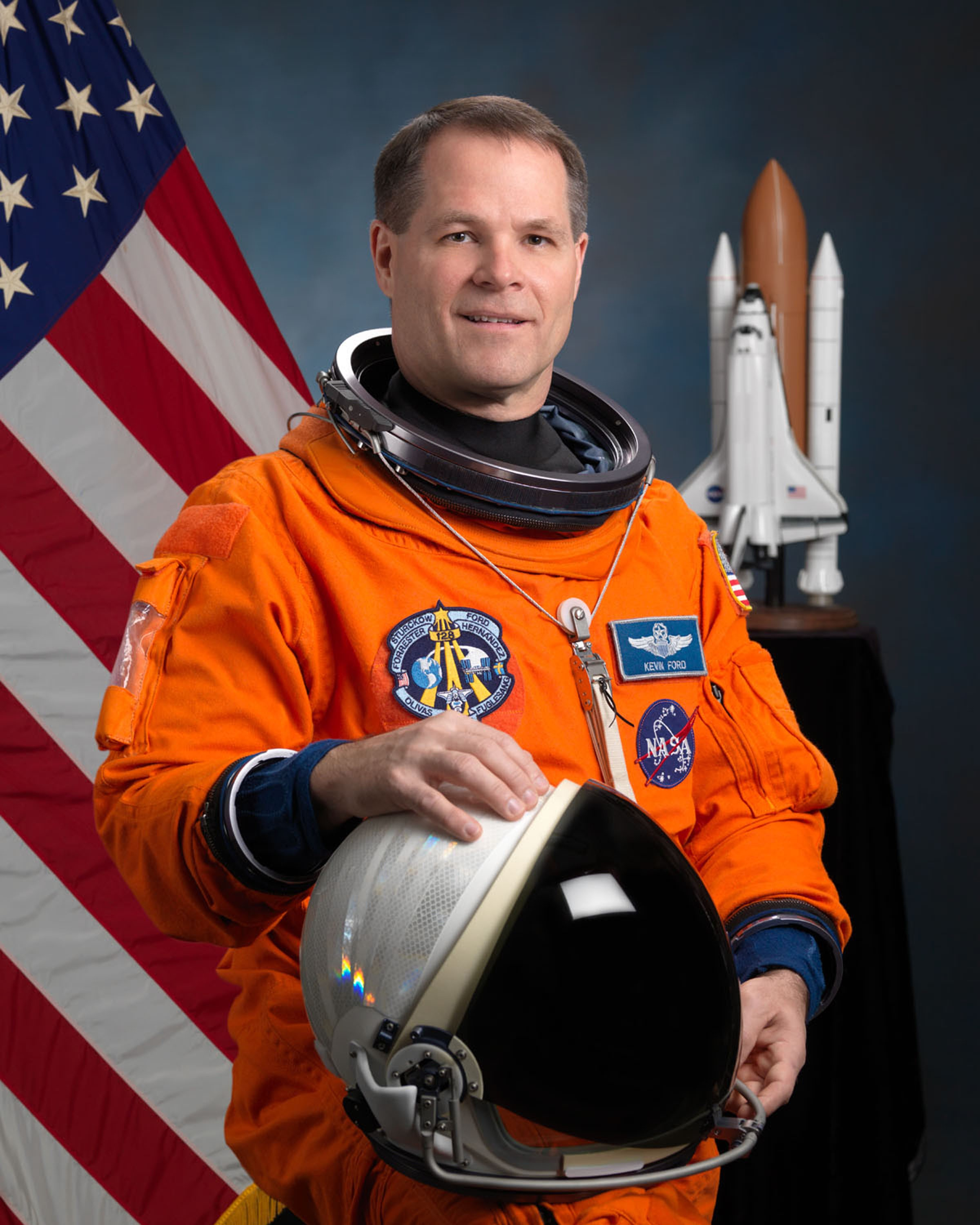
- Born: Kevin Anthony Ford; July 7, 1960 (age 66); Portland, Indiana, U.S.
- Education: University of Notre Dame (BS); Troy University (MA); University of Florida (MS); Air University (PhD)
- Space career

NASA astronaut
- Rank: Colonel, USAF
- Time in space: 157d 13h 9m
- Selection: NASA Group 18 (2000)
- Missions: STS-128; Soyuz TMA-06M (Expedition 33/34)
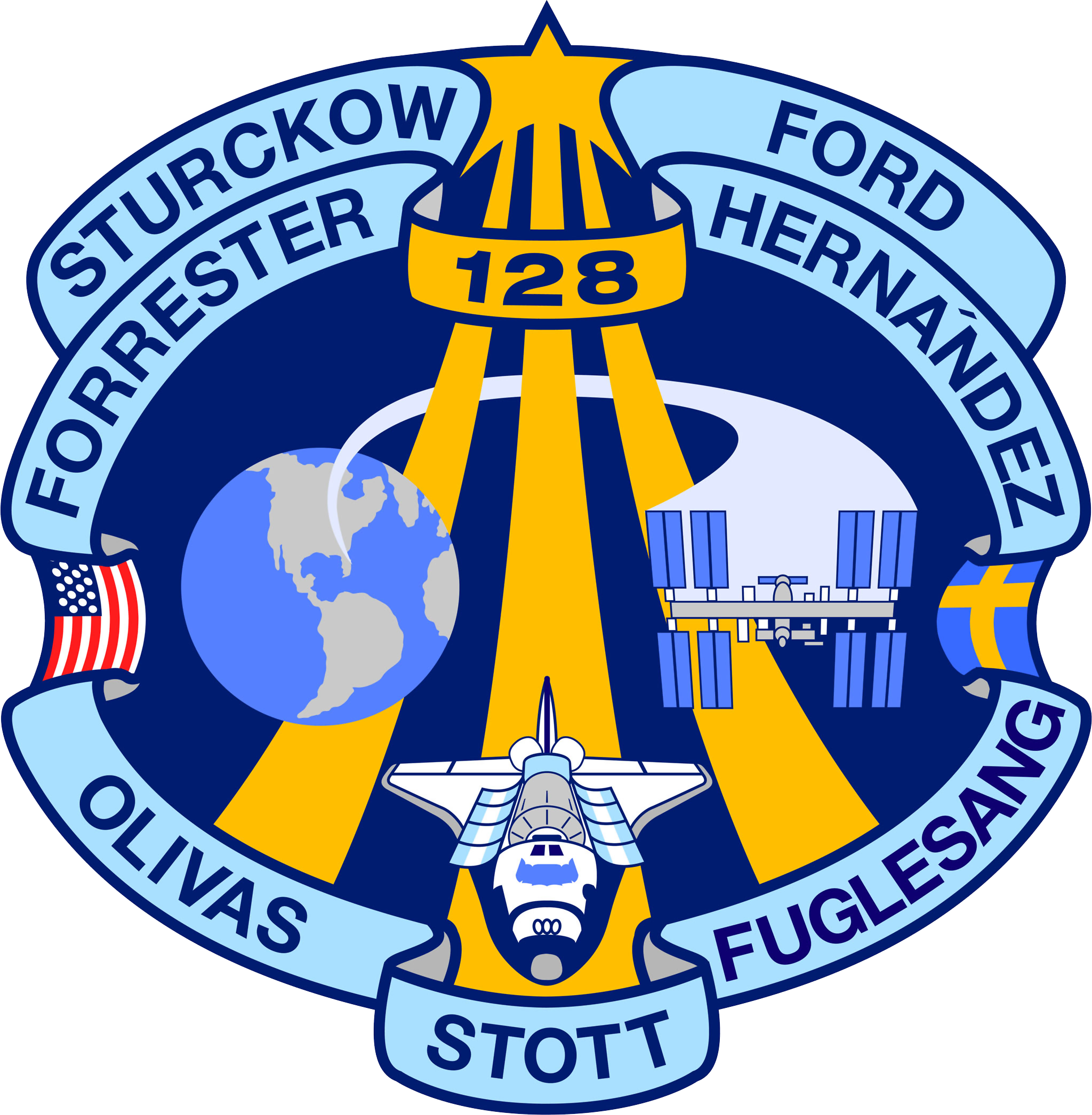
- Mission insignia
- Retired: January 2014

Kevin Anthony Ford (born July 7, 1960) is a retired United States Air Force colonel and former NASA astronaut. Ford has received a number of special honors and awards, some of which are the Air Force Meritorious Service Medal, Air Force Commendation Medal, Aerial Achievement Medal and the Armed Forces Expeditionary Medal. Ford has also logged more than 6,100 flying hours and also holds FAA certificates for airplanes, helicopters, gliders, and balloons. Ford has served in many roles at NASA since his selection in July 2000. The roles include as a Capsule Communicator or CAPCOM. He was also the Director Of Operations at the Gagarin Cosmonaut Training Center in Star City, Russia from January 2004 to January 2005. He was pilot of STS-128 and flight engineer 2 of Soyuz TMA-06M from October 23, 2012, to March 16, 2013. He served as ISS flight engineer for Expedition 33 and commander of Expedition 34.

== Early life and education ==
Ford was born July 7, 1960, in Portland, Indiana and considers Montpelier, Indiana his hometown. He graduated from Blackford High School in Hartford City, Indiana in 1978. He received his Bachelor of Science degree in aerospace engineering from the University of Notre Dame in 1982, a Master of Science degree in international relations from Troy State University in 1989, a Master of Science degree in aerospace engineering from the University of Florida in 1994, and a Ph.D. in astronautical engineering from the Air Force Institute of Technology of Air University in 1997. He has attended the U.S. Air Force Squadron Officer School, the Air Command and Staff College Associate Program, and the Air War College.

He is a distinguished graduate of Detachment 225, Reserve Officer Training Corps, 1982. He also a distinguished graduate of Undergraduate Pilot Training at Columbus AFB in 1984 and a distinguished graduate of the United States Air Force Test Pilot School in 1990.

== Military career ==
Ford was commissioned as a second lieutenant in 1982 and completed primary Air Force jet training at Columbus Air Force Base, Mississippi in 1984. He trained in the F-15 Eagle and was assigned to the 22nd Tactical Fighter Squadron, Bitburg Air Base, Germany, from 1984 to 1987, and then to the 57th Fighter Interceptor Squadron at Keflavik Naval Air Station, Iceland until 1989, intercepting and escorting 18 Soviet combat aircraft over the North Atlantic. After spending 1990 as a student at the United States Air Force Test Pilot School, Edwards Air Force Base, California, Ford flew flight test missions in the F-16 Fighting Falcon with the 3247th Test Squadron at Eglin Air Force Base, Florida from 1991 to 1994. Test experience there included multiple F-16 flutter missions, development of the ALE-47 Countermeasures Dispenser System, multiple safe separation, ballistics, and fuse tests, and air-to-air missile development testing, including the first AMRAAM shot from the F-16 Air Defense Fighter variant. Following a three-year assignment to pursue full-time studies as a doctoral candidate at Wright-Patterson Air Force Base, Ohio, he was assigned to the Air Force Test Pilot School where he served as the director of plans and programs, taught academics, and instructed students on flight test techniques in the F-15, F-16, and gliders. Ford has 6100 flying hours and holds FAA Airline Transport Pilot certificate for airplanes (B757/767 type ratings), commercial certificates for helicopters and gliders, and a private license for hot air balloons. He is a certified flight instructor in airplanes and gliders. Ford retired from the Air Force in June 2008 as a colonel.

== NASA career ==
Selected as an astronaut candidate by NASA in July 2000, Ford reported for training in August 2000. Following the completion of two years of training and evaluation, he was assigned technical duties in the Astronaut Office Advanced Vehicles Branch, working advanced exploration issues, and to the Space Shuttle Branch, working on the development and test of the Shuttle Cockpit Avionics Upgrade. He served as Director of Operations at the Gagarin Cosmonaut Training Center in Star City, Russia from January 2004 to January 2005. At the 2007 Grand Prix of Houston, Ford got to ride the Minardi F1 two-seater race car, driven by Zsolt Baumgartner. Ford was pilot of Space Shuttle Discovery STS-128 which launched on August 28, 2009, and landed on September 11, 2009, delivering 20,000 pounds of internal and external cargo to the International Space Station. Following that space flight, Colonel Ford trained for and worked space missions as a Space Station CAPCOM in the Mission Control Center. On October 23, 2012, Ford again flew to space as part of Expedition 33 aboard Soyuz TMA-06M. Ford became commander of Expedition 34 on November 18, 2012, with the departure from the ISS of the Soyuz TMA-05M spacecraft, which returned the Expedition 33 crew to Earth. He, along with the Russian crewmbmers of Soyuz TMA-06M, returned to Earth on March 16, 2013.

== Awards and decorations ==
Personal decorations
Width-44 crimson ribbon with a pair of width-2 white stripes on the edges	Legion of Merit
Width-44 crimson ribbon with two width-8 white stripes at distance 4 from the edges.	Meritorious Service Medal
	Aerial Achievement Medal
	Air Force Commendation Medal
Campaign and service medals
Width=44 scarlet ribbon with a central width-4 golden yellow stripe, flanked by pairs of width-1 scarlet, white, Old Glory blue, and white stripes	National Defense Service Medal with service star
	Armed Forces Expeditionary Medal
Service, training, and marksmanship awards
	Air Force Longevity Service Award with silver oak leaf cluster
	Air Force Training Ribbon
NASA awards
	NASA Space Flight Medal

=== Other achievements ===
1998 David B. Barnes Outstanding Flight Instructor Award, U.S. Air Force Test Pilot School

Professor of the Practice at NC State University

Preceded by Sunita Williams	ISS Expedition Commander; November 18, 2012, to March 15, 2013	Succeeded by Chris Hadfield
