= Expedition 33 (ISS) =

Long-duration mission to the International Space Station

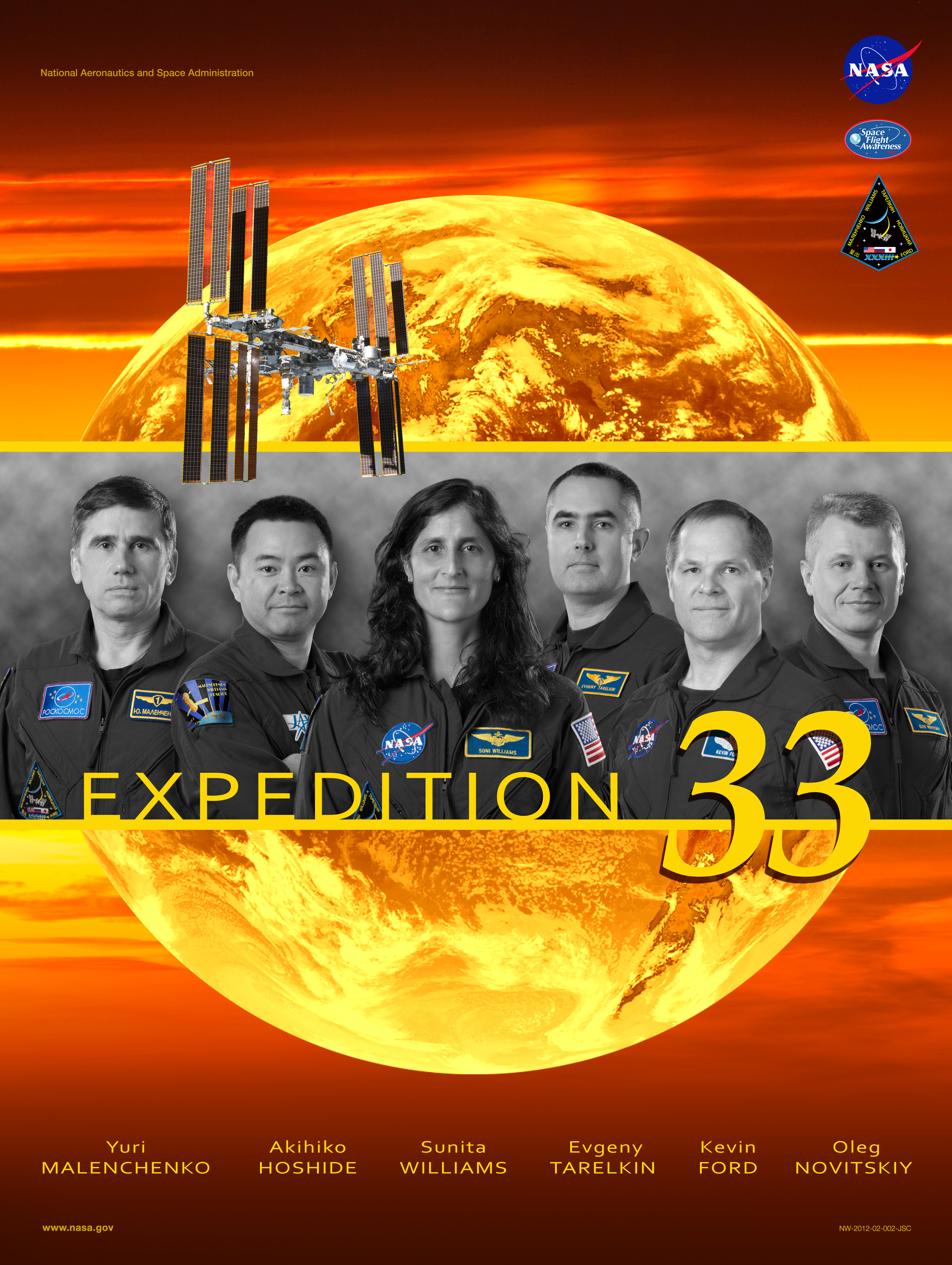
- Promotional poster
- Mission type: Long-duration expedition

Expedition
- Space station: International Space Station
- Began: 16 September 2012, 23:09 UTC
- Ended: 18 November 2012
- Arrived aboard: Soyuz TMA-05M; Soyuz TMA-06M
- Departed aboard: Soyuz TMA-05M; Soyuz TMA-06M

Crew
- Crew size: 6
- Members: Expedition 32/33: Sunita Williams; Yuri Malenchenko; Akihiko Hoshide Expedition 33/34: Kevin A. Ford; Oleg Novitskiy; Evgeny Tarelkin
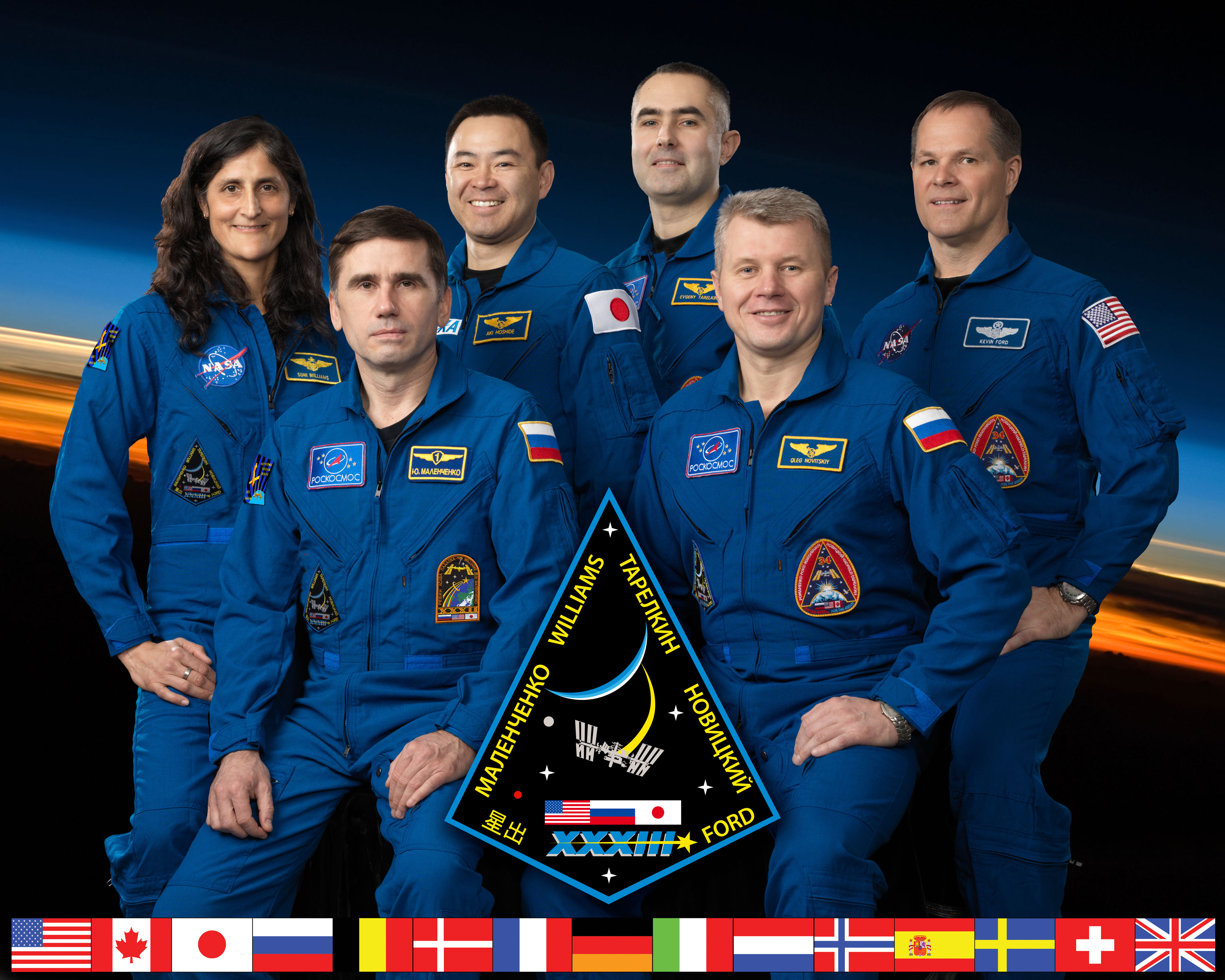
- Expedition 33 mission patch (l-r) Williams, Malenchenko, Hoshide, Tarelkin, Novitskiy and Ford ISS expeditions

Expedition 33 was the 33rd long-duration expedition to the International Space Station (ISS). It began on 16 September 2012 with the departure from the ISS of the Soyuz TMA-04M spacecraft, which returned the Expedition 32 crew to Earth.

== Crew ==
Position	First Part (September–October 2012)	Second Part (October–November 2012)
Commander	Sunita Williams, NASA; Second spaceflight	
Flight Engineer 1	Yuri Malenchenko, RSA; Fifth spaceflight	
Flight Engineer 2	Akihiko Hoshide, JAXA; Second spaceflight	
Flight Engineer 3		Kevin A. Ford, NASA; Second and last spaceflight
Flight Engineer 4		Oleg Novitskiy, RSA; First spaceflight
Flight Engineer 5		Evgeny Tarelkin, RSA; Only spaceflight

Source
NASA

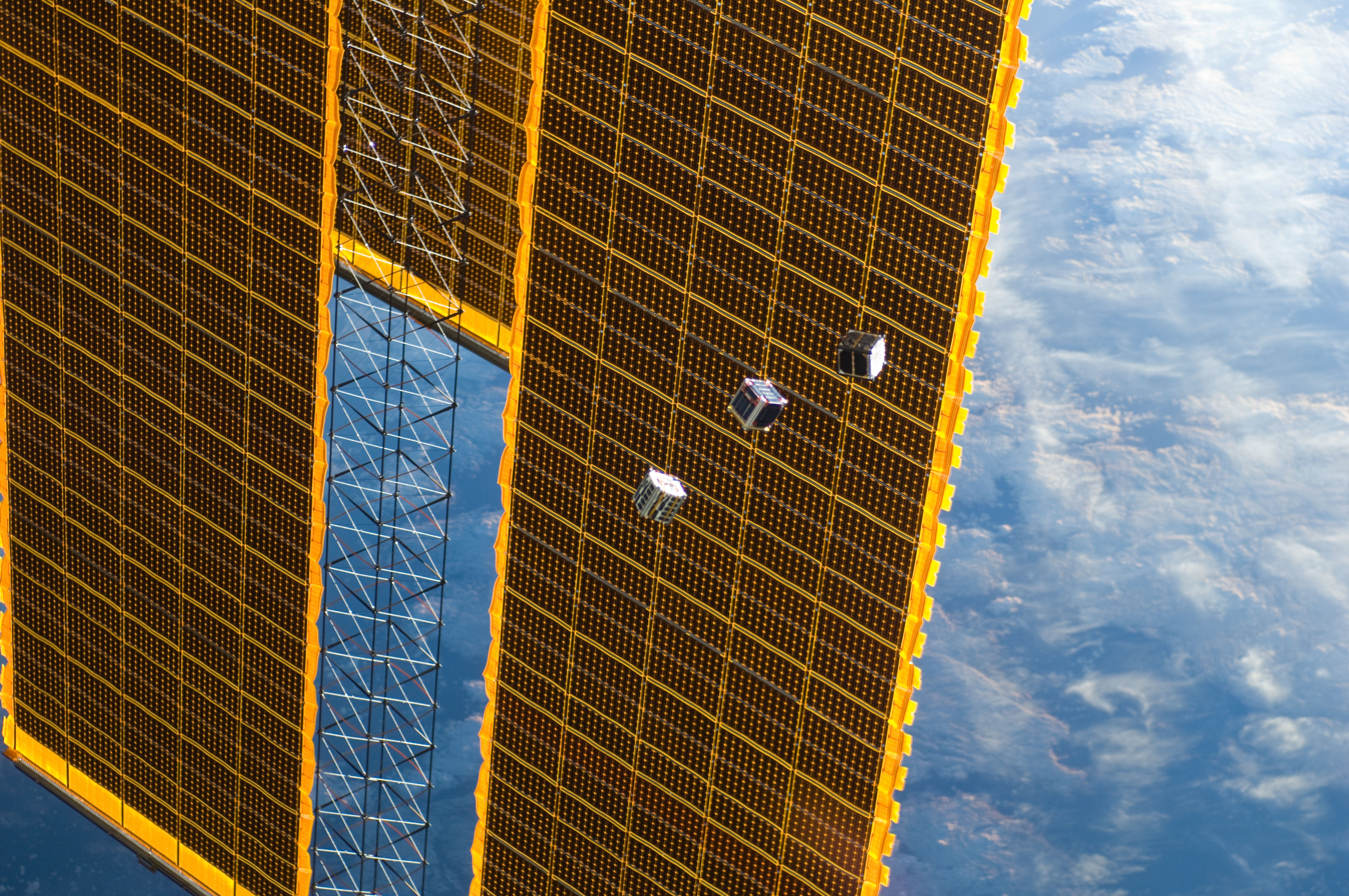
CubeSats launched by Expedition 33 crew on 4 October 2012

== Notable experiments ==
The crew successfully experimented with the Delay-tolerant networking protocol and managed to control a Lego robot on Earth from space.
