= Soyuz TMA-06M =

2012 Russian crewed spaceflight to the ISS

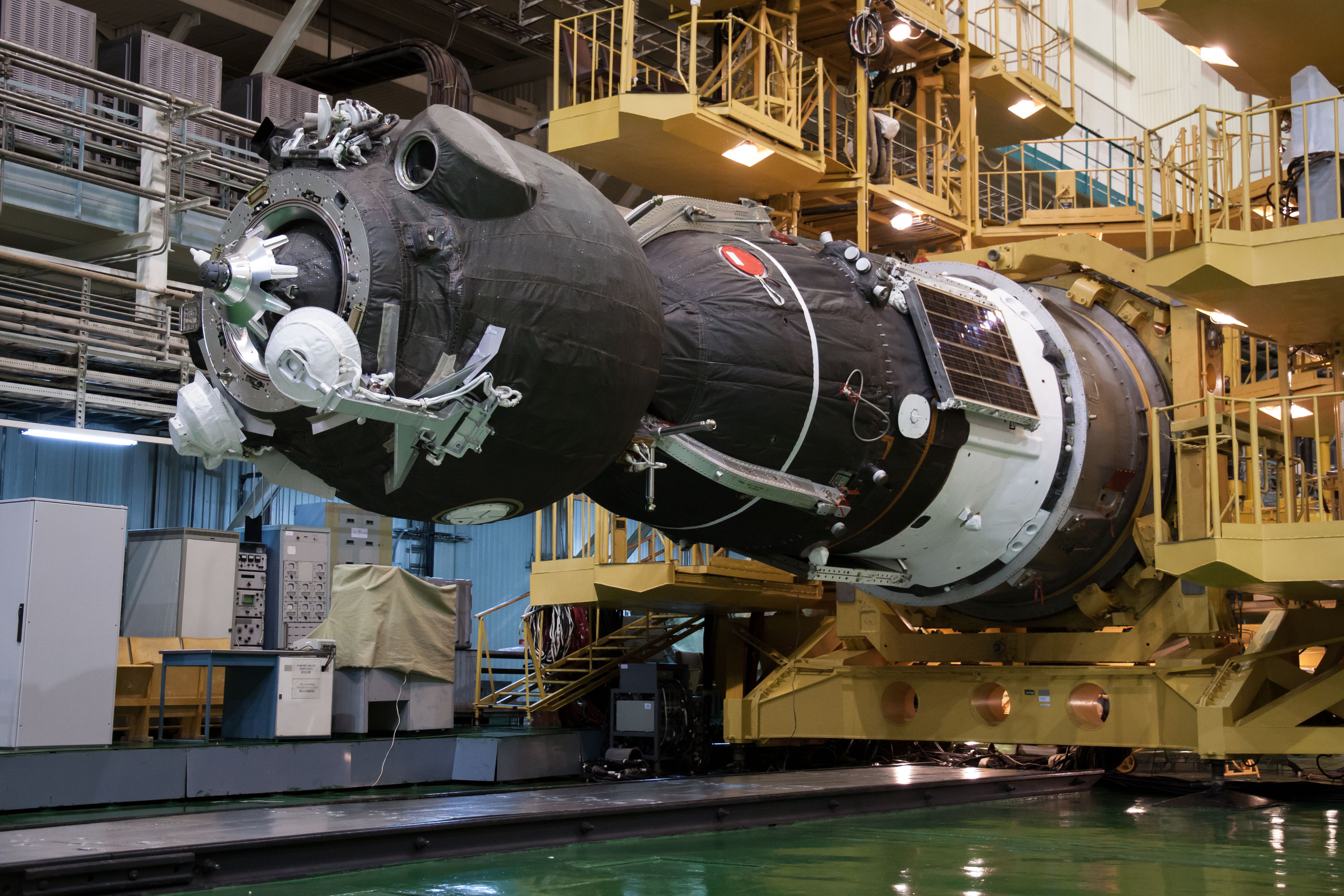
- Soyuz TMA-06M loading on Soyuz-FG
- Operator: Roscosmos
- COSPAR ID: 2012-058A
- SATCAT no.: 38871
- Mission duration: 143d, 16h, 20m

Spacecraft properties
- Spacecraft type: Soyuz-TMA 11F747
- Manufacturer: Energia

Crew
- Crew size: 3
- Members: Oleg Novitskiy; Evgeny Tarelkin; Kevin A. Ford
- Callsign: Kazbek

Start of mission
- Launch date: 23 October 2012, 10:51:11 UTC
- Rocket: Soyuz-FG
- Launch site: Baikonur 31/6

End of mission
- Landing date: 16 March 2013, 03:11 UTC

Orbital parameters
- Reference system: Geocentric
- Regime: Low Earth

Docking with ISS
- Docking port: Poisk zenith
- Docking date: 25 October 2012; 12:29 UTC
- Undocking date: 15 March 2013; 23:43 UTC
- Time docked: 141d 11h 14m
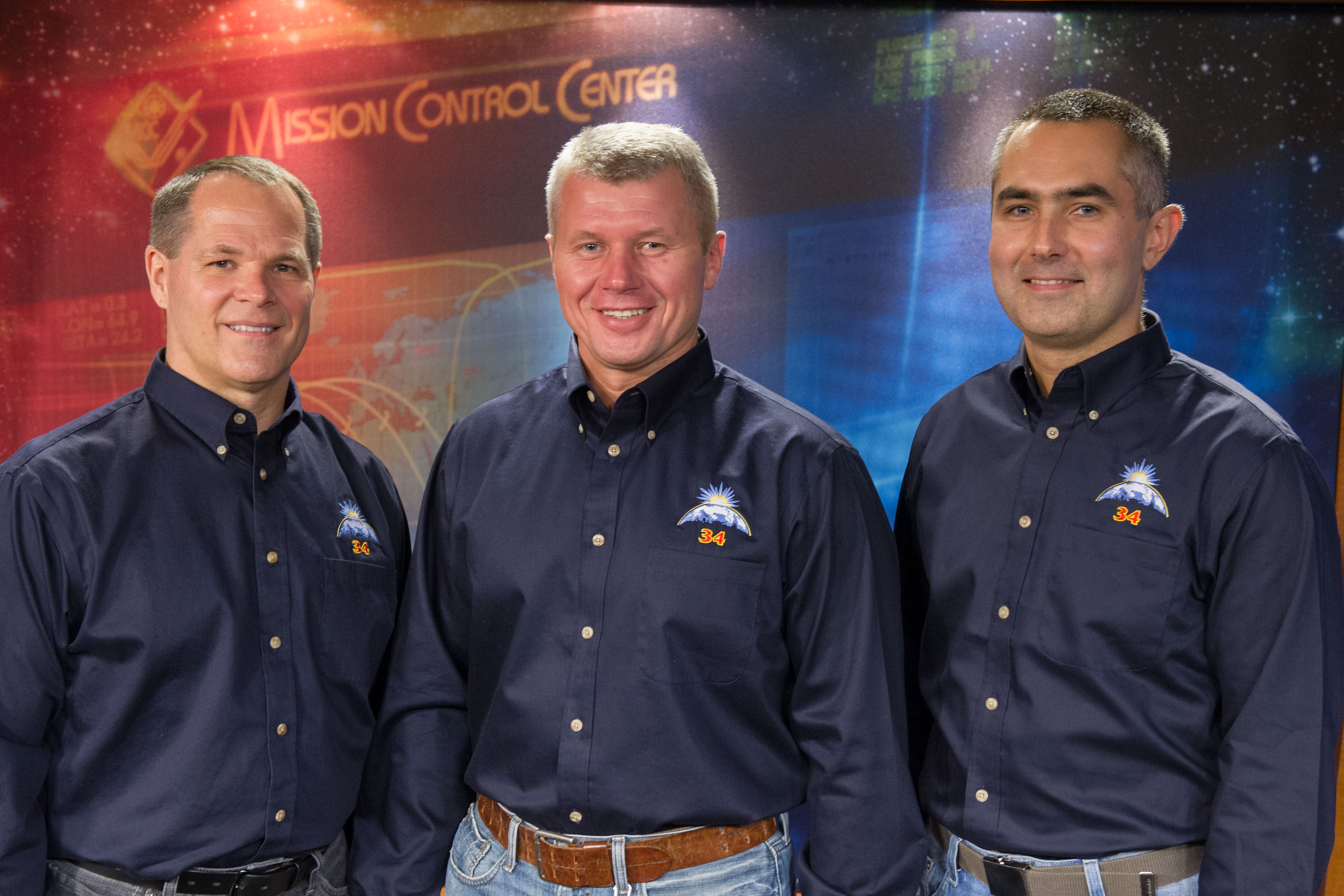
- (l-r) Ford, Novitskiy and Tarelkin Soyuz programme (Crewed missions)

Soyuz TMA-06M was a spaceflight to the International Space Station launched on 23 October 2012, transporting three members of the Expedition 33 crew. TMA-06M was the 115th flight of a Soyuz spacecraft, the first flight launching in 1967. Soyuz TMA-06M launch was also the first crewed flight from the remote Site 31 pad since July 1984.

The Soyuz remained on board the space station for the Expedition 33 increment to serve as an emergency escape vehicle. Soyuz TMA-06M successfully returned to Earth on 15 March 2013.

== Crew ==
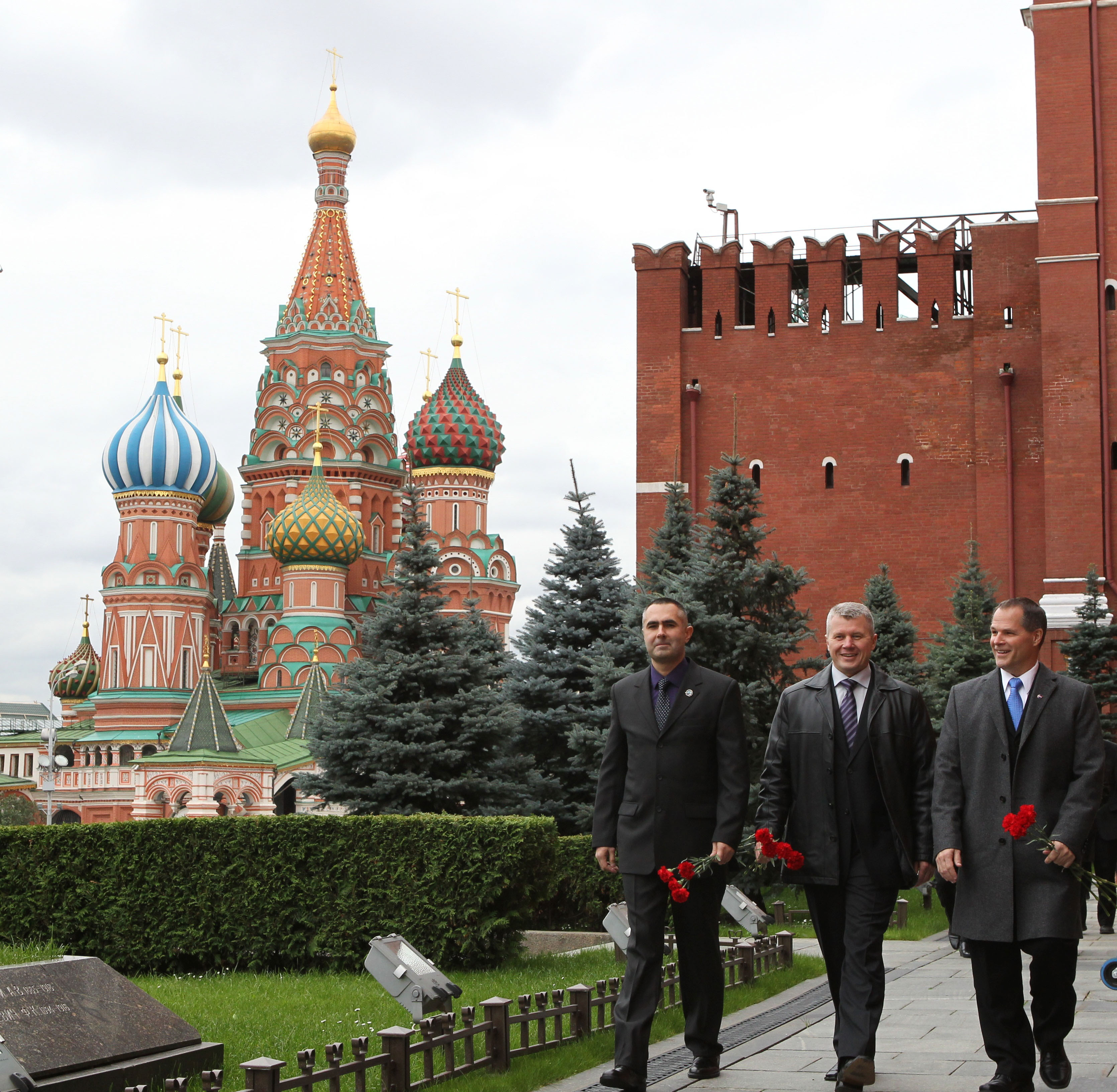
The Soyuz TMA-06M crew members conduct their ceremonial tour of Red Square on 25 September 2012.

Position	Crew Member
Commander	(Russia) Oleg Novitskiy, Roscosmos; Expedition 33; First spaceflight
Flight Engineer 1	(Russia) Evgeny Tarelkin, Roscosmos; Expedition 33; Only spaceflight
Flight Engineer 2	(United States) Kevin A. Ford, NASA; Expedition 33; Second and last spaceflight

=== Backup crew ===
Position	Crew Member
Commander	(Russia) Pavel Vinogradov, Roscosmos
Flight Engineer 1	(Russia) Aleksandr Misurkin, Roscosmos
Flight Engineer 2	(United States) Christopher Cassidy, NASA

== Rollout ==
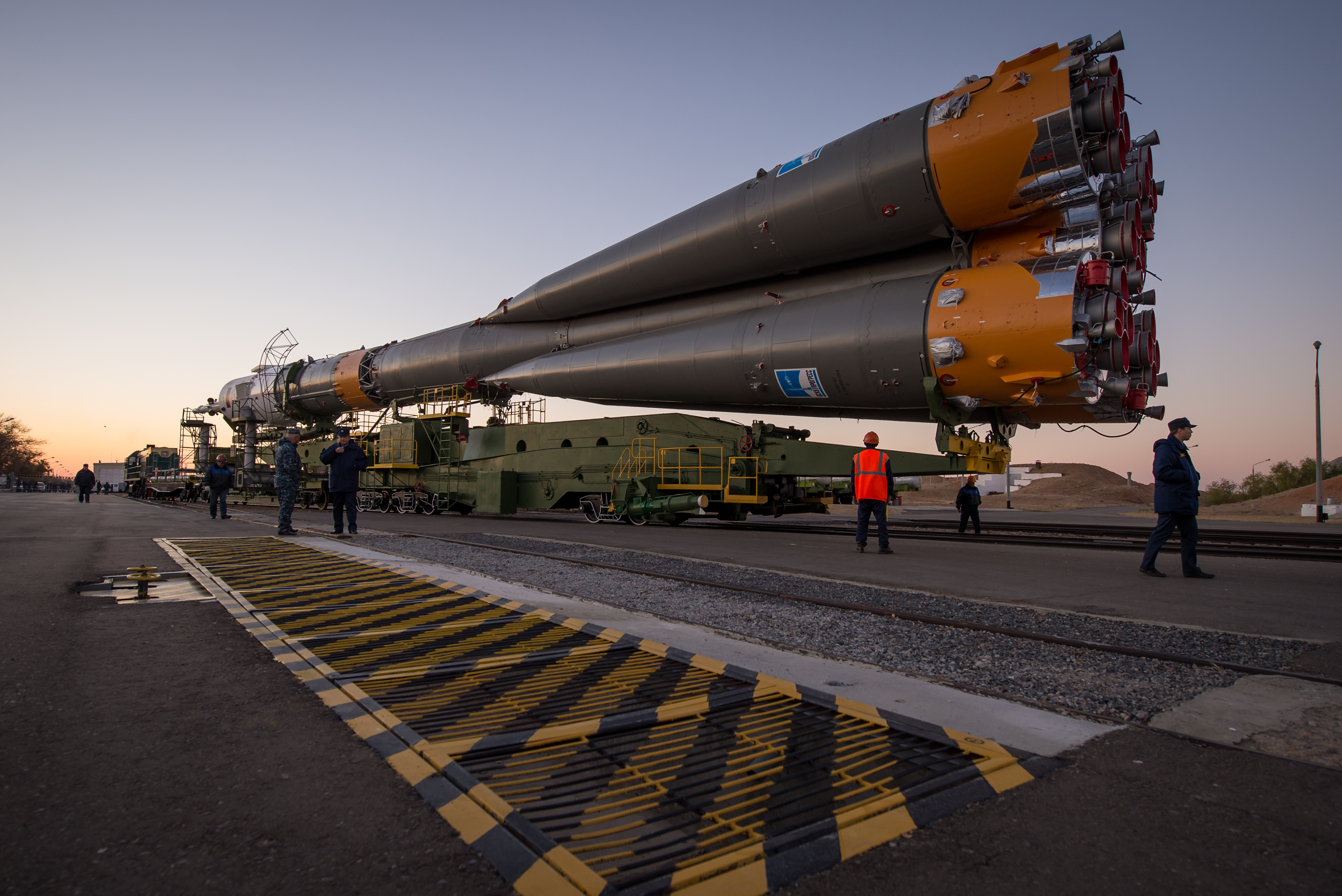
The Soyuz-FG rollout by train on 21 October 2012

On 21 October 2012, the Soyuz-FG rocket booster with Soyuz TMA-06M spacecraft was rolled out by train and erected on pad 6 at Site 31, also referred to as the Tereshkova pad. Launch pad 31/6 was used for this mission since the usual launch pad for crewed flights – pad 5 at Site 1 was undergoing maintenance and upgrades. Also on the launch day, the crew's trip to the 31/6 Launch Pad took about one hour and 10 minutes – 50 minutes longer than the drive to the 1/5 Launch Pad.

== Launch ==
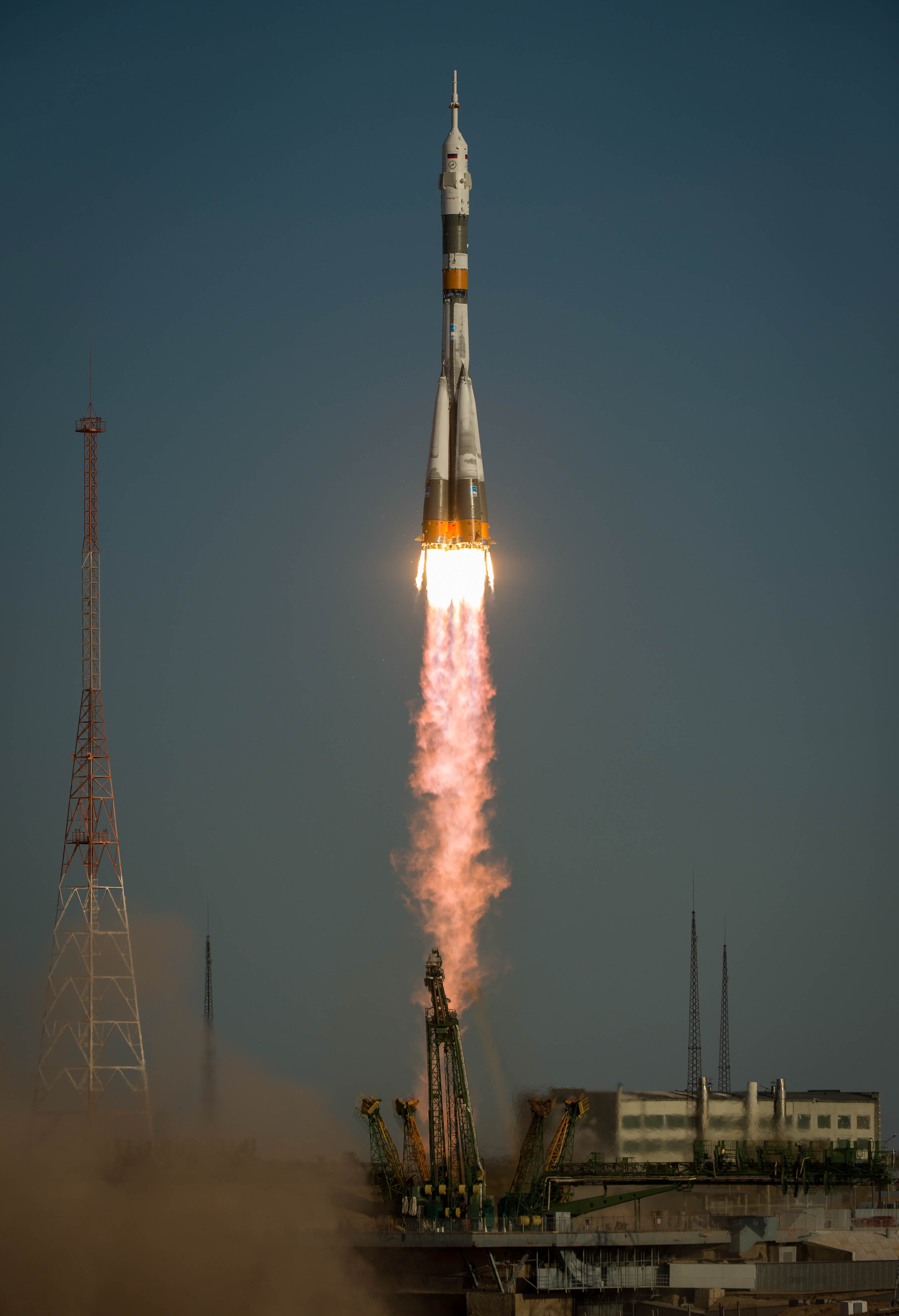
The TMA-06M spacecraft launches to the International Space Station on 23 October 2012.

Soyuz TMA-06M was launched atop of a Soyuz-FG rocket at 10:51:11 GMT on 23 October 2012 from the Baikonur Cosmodrome, in Kazakhstan. The launch of TMA-06M from Baikonur's Site 31 was the first human liftoff from that launch pad since July 1984 when Soyuz T-12 was sent to the Salyut 7 space station.

Following the flawless launch, the Soyuz spacecraft successfully achieved orbital insertion 9 minutes later and began its 34-orbit journey to the International Space Station.

Live television from inside the Soyuz TMA-06M command module showed commander Oleg Novitskiy monitoring the automated ascent from the center seat. Seated on the left and right to him was flight engineer Evgeny Tarelkin and NASA astronaut Kevin Ford, respectively. Shortly after the launch, one of the cosmonauts reported an alarm of some nature, but flight controllers later said there were no obvious problems.

=== Docking ===
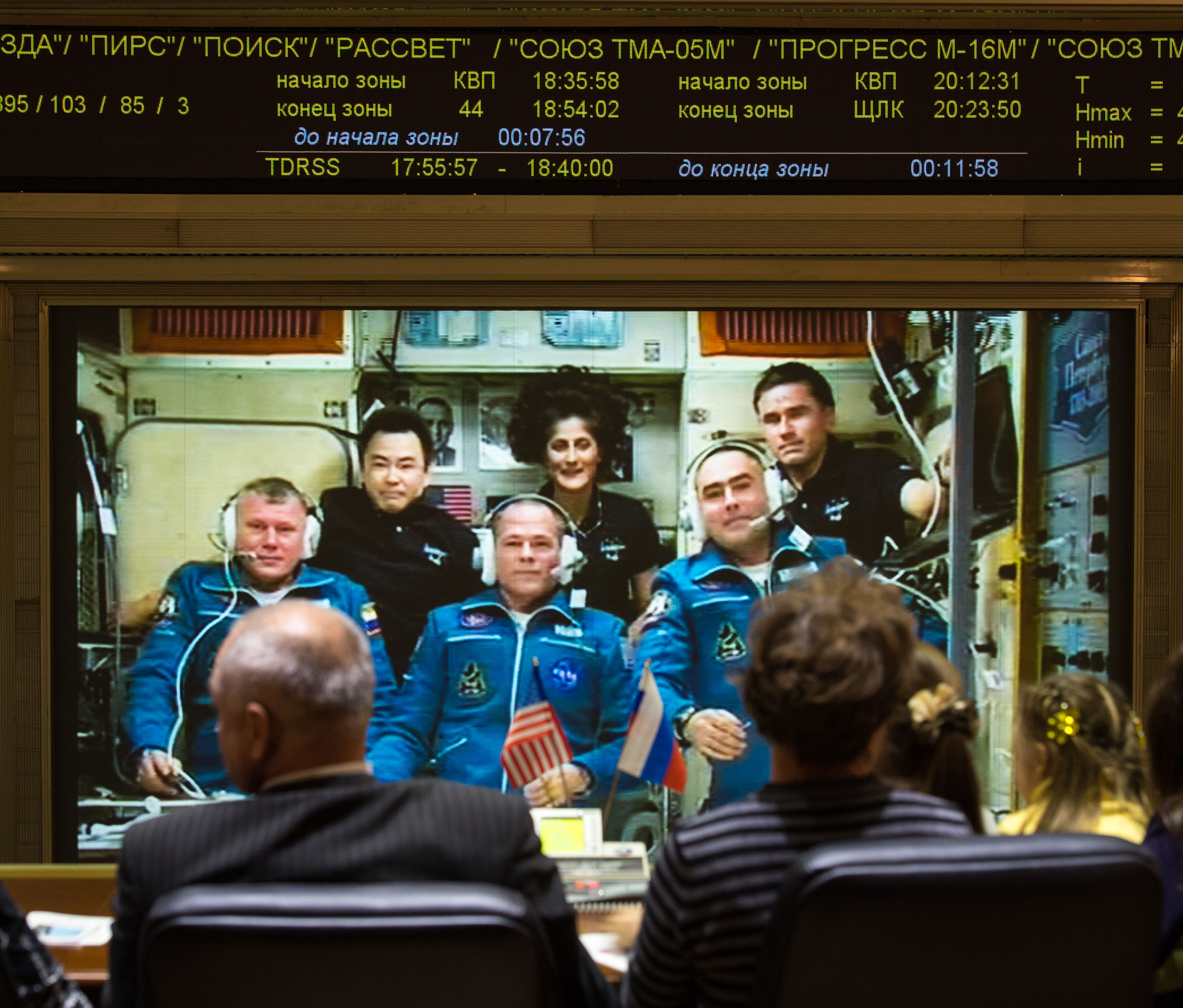
On board the Space Station, Soyuz crew talk with the Russian Mission Control shortly after docking.

In order to set up the Rendezvous Operations, the Soyuz spacecraft performed three orbital adjustments to increase its altitude. The first two of these burns was completed on the launch day with the first conducted just 4.5 hours after the launch. The third burn was conducted on Flight Day 2. Aboard the Space Station, the crew also took final preparations for the docking and cameras aboard the Station were configured to record the next day's docking.

On the docking day, the Automated Rendezvous Sequence that was initiated at 10:11 UTC. After three minutes, the Space Station also conducted a maneuver to the proper Docking Attitude and the Soyuz crew activated the KURS Navigation System that provides accurate Range and Velocity Data for the spacecraft's on-board computers.

When arriving at a distance of 300 meters, Mission Controllers in Korolev, Russia gave a GO for the Flyaround. After the Flyaround was completed, station-keeping operations began at a distance of 190 meters from the Space Station. This period was used by the Mission Controllers to verify all systems and alignment with the Space Station. Station-keeping was shortened as all system checked out well and the green light was issued for the final approach.

Soyuz TMA-06M docked with the ISS at 12:29 GMT on 25 October 2012, about six minutes earlier than planned. The spacecraft docked at the MRM-2 Poisk module, while Soyuz TMA-06M and the ISS were flying 254 miles (409 km) as the space station flew above southern Ukraine.

The crew performed the standard one-hour leak check operation before getting started with hatch opening procedures. After leak checks and system checks were completed, the crew opened the hatches and entered the Space Station at around 15:15 GMT. They were greeted by Expedition 33 crewmembers Sunita Williams, Yuri Malenchenko and Akihiko Hoshide.

== Return to Earth ==
Soyuz TMA-06M undocked from the ISS on 15 March 2013 at 11:43 PM (GMT), carrying Novitsky, Tarelkin, and Ford, and landed safely at 3:06:30 AM (GMT) the following day. The landing was north of the town of Arkalyk.

== Medaka fish ==
Soyuz TMA-06M carried 32 Medaka fish that will be used to test how conditions in space impact on living organisms. The fish will live inside a fish tank, called the Aquatic Habitat (AQH) in the Japanese Kibo Lab Module, which was delivered to the space station by JAXA's Kounotori 3 spacecraft in July 2012.
