= The Apollo Murders =

2021 novel by Chris Hadfield

- First edition cover
- Author: Chris Hadfield
- Language: English
- Series: The Apollo Murders
- Genre: Alternate history; Thriller
- Publisher: Little, Brown and Company
- Publication date: October 12, 2021
- Publication place: Canada
- Media type: Hardback
- Pages: 480
- ISBN: 978-0-316-26453-2
- Followed by: The Defector

The Apollo Murders is a 2021 alternate history, (Note: Hadfield stated that because "half the characters in the book are real people and 95% of what happens in it is real", The Apollo Murders is "not fantasy or science fiction, [but] alternative history fiction that’s a small turn off the real path of history.") thriller novel by Canadian retired astronaut and writer Chris Hadfield. It was first published in October 2021 in the United States by Little, Brown and Company, and in the United Kingdom by Quercus. The book is Hadfield's debut novel, and is the first in his Apollo Murders series, followed later by The Defector in 2023 and Final Orbit in 2025. Hadfield had previously published three non-fiction books, his first being his autobiography, An Astronaut's Guide to Life on Earth (2013).

The Apollo Murders is set in an alternate 1973 during the Cold War, and is about Apollo 18, a clandestine military mission to the Moon. (Note: The Apollo program was cancelled after Apollo 17 due to declining public interest and lack of funding.) The novel includes several historical figures from the period, including American astronaut Alan Shepard, NASA mission director Gene Kranz, and Soviet engineer, Vladimir Chelomey. Hadfield has stated that many of the events that take place in the book are real.

The Apollo Murders was nominated for the 2022 Sidewise Awards for Alternate History, and was also shortlisted for the 2022 Wilbur Smith Adventure Writing Prize.

== Background ==
Hadfield said the idea for The Apollo Murders came from his British publisher, who had read a foreword Hadfield had written for a 2015 limited edition release of Ray Bradbury's 1950 book The Martian Chronicles. The publisher contacted Hadfield and suggested that he write "a killer fiction thiller", and even proposed The Apollo Murders as the title. Hadfield mulled over the idea, but it was only when the COVID pandemic began at the end of 2019 and he found himself with time on his hands that he began working on the novel.

While looking for ideas, Hadfield learned that two Soviet vehicles, Lunokhod, a Moon rover, and Almaz, a military space station, had both failed in 1973 with no explanation. He decided to write the novel about a fictitious Apollo 18 mission to the Moon, incorporating these and other events that happened in 1973. Hadfield drew on his own experience in space, and his work as NASA's CAPCOM at mission control in Houston. He also speaks Russian and has lived in Star City for five years where he worked in Moscow's mission control center. Hadfield did extensive research for the book, but when he could not find the information he needed, he consulted with former Apollo astronauts.

Being his first novel, Hadfield took a fiction writing class and read Stephen King's memoir/manual, On Writing: A Memoir of the Craft (2000). Hadfield's wife said, "He was so scared, but I knew it would be good." He recalled that the first draft of The Apollo Murders was "way too much" at 195,000 words, and it was eventually reduced by a third down to 135,000 words and 480 pages.

Hadfield stated that much of what happens in the book is real. He noted that when the Apollo program was cancelled after Apollo 17, due to declining public interest and lack of funding, NASA turned their attention to developing a Space Shuttle. NASA approached the Department of Defence for funding, who dictated the shuttle's design, and that it be capable of seizing a Soviet satellite and loading it into its payload bay. (Note: Hadfield stated in an interview at CollectSPACE in October 2021 that the shuttle design specification document had been recently declassified.) Hadfield added that The Apollo Murders is not as "far fetched" as it appears. What happens "was very much indicative of what was intended in the height of the Cold War ... in the early '70s."

== Plot summary ==
In an alternate 1973, the United States is preparing to launch Apollo 18, a military mission to the Moon funded by the Department of Defense. Kazimieras "Kaz" Zemeckis, an astronaut candidate, who was grounded after he lost an eye when his F-4 Phantom jet struck a seagull, supports the mission from the ground, and is the liaison between the Apollo program and the National Security Agency. Apollo 18 is to be crewed by mission commander Tom Hoffman, Lunar Module pilot Luke Hemming, and command module pilot Michael Esdale. But Tom dies in an unexplained helicopter crash, and backup astronaut Chad Miller takes his place as mission commander. Apollo 18's military objective is to land on the Moon near to Lunokhod, a Soviet rover, establish what it is doing, and then disable it. But close to Apollo 18's launch, the Americans learn that the Soviets are about to put a military space station, Almaz, into Earth orbit to spy on the Americans. Apollo 18's mission is changed to first rendezvous with Almaz in orbit, photograph it, disable it, and then continue to the Moon. Apollo 18's military agenda is not revealed to the public.

In April 1973, Apollo 18 is launched and it intercepts Almaz, but the crew are surprised to find two cosmonauts aboard the Soviet station. A battle ensues, and Almaz is destroyed. Luke and one of the cosmonauts are killed, and the other cosmonaut, Svetlana Gromova, is taken aboard Apollo 18. With a crew of two Americans and a Russian, Apollo 18 proceeds to the Moon. Vladimir Chelomey at Moscow mission control, who has been listening to Apollo 18's communications with Houston, secretly sends messages to Chad and Svetlana in Russian. Chad is a Russian orphan adopted in Berlin as a child after World War II by an American family. Moscow instructs Chad to retrieve a rock Lunokhod has found, but Chad gives Svetlana no indication whether he will comply with Moscow or where his loyalties lie. Chad pilots the lunar lander with Svetlana to the surface near Lunokhod, and the two proceed to the rover on foot. Chad locates and pockets the rock, and then, unbeknown to Svetlana, sabotages the rover by covering its thermal radiator with lunar dust causing it to overheat. Chad and Svetlana return to the command module in orbit around the Moon, and it returns to Earth.

Kaz and flight director Gene Kranz are told that investigations have revealed that Tom's helicopter had been sabotaged, and that Chad may have been responsible. Kaz and Gene begin to question Chad's loyalties to the United States. Kaz is aboard one of the American recovery ships in the Pacific Ocean waiting for the Apollo 18 splashdown, but Chad changes the capsule's re-entry point away from the American ships and close to a Soviet submarine. Kaz arrives by helicopter a while after splashdown to find Chad and Svetlana fighting in the water over the Moon rock. Svetlana gets the better of him and escapes with the rock in the submarine. Kaz confronts Chad about his actions, but Chad dies from his injuries.

== Critical reception ==
In a starred review, Publishers Weekly called The Apollo Murders "an intelligent and surprising nail-biter that Tom Clancy fans will relish". The reviewer complimented Hadfield's attention to detail, adding that it heightens the novel's suspense. A reviewer in Kirkus Reviews was a little critical of the book's technical details. They felt that its focus on technical descriptions tended to impede the pace of the first part of the book, creating the impression that it "will never get off the launchpad". But despite a "somewhat over-the-top" climax, the reviewer added that the novel does have "the basic bones of a good thriller".

In a review of The Apollo Murders in New Scientist, Jacob Aron called Hadfield's debut novel "an accomplished story from a first-time novelist". He described the plot as "improbable but not implausible". Aron wrote that because Hadfield has had first-hand experience of being in space, and has created a story with events that are quite plausible, his "techno-thiller jargon" comes across as quite authentic. One minor complaint Aron had with the book was Hadfield's portrayal of Russian dialogue. Aron explained that when Russians speak to Russians in the book, their speech is written in English, but when Russians speak to someone from the US, it is written in transliterated Cyrillic script, which is then translated into English, "to grating effect". Natalie Xenos described The Apollo Murders as "a superior space thriller". In a review of the book at Culturefly, she said that Hadfield's background as an astronaut and his technical knowledge of space missions, adds to the novel's realism. She found the story "both exhilarating and terrifying, and the technical detail that felt so overwhelming at the beginning becomes the book’s biggest strength". Xenos remarked that Hadfield "captures the Cold War tensions perfectly", and the constant switching of the story's point of view creates "an even more expansive feel".

Writing in The Space Review, aerospace analyst and journalist, Jeff Foust found The Apollo Murders "an enjoyable read, with plenty of plot twists and technical details". He stated that Hadfield skilfully balances "narrative tension" with technical detail, without letting the technical detail interfere with the pace of the story. Foust noted that while the novel has a few "leaps of logic", for example, diverting Apollo 18's Moon mission to disable a Soviet space station, and suppressing all public reporting on the Apollo mission without arousing any suspicion, Hadfield "pulls it off", and demonstrates his ability to write engaging stories. Reviewing the book for the National Space Society, Peter Spasov called The Apollo Murders a "space adventure" and "a story beyond compare—for both the truth and the fiction". He wrote that the novel's "shining gem" is how Hadfield's knowledge of the Apollo program's operations and equipment gives the narrative "absolute credibility", and immerses the reader in the center of the action. Spasov remarked that the American cover-ups in the story, and Hadfield's claim that many events in the novel really happened, may leave readers wondering "what is really going on behind the public glamour of space exploration."
