= Stag Island (Ontario) =

Island in Canada

Native name: Saw-ge-too-yawn
- Location within Ontario

Geography
- Location: St. Clair River
- Coordinates: 42.884°N 82.465°W

Administration
- Canada
- Province: Ontario
- County: Lambton

Additional information
- Official website: http://www.stagisland.com/

Stag Island is a private Canadian island located in the St. Clair River between Corunna, Ontario and Marysville, Michigan. The island currently houses over 100 cottages owned by both American and Canadian citizens. A ferry service is run from Corunna to the island by the Stag Island Auxiliary Club.

== History ==
Stag Island used to be a resort destination in the early 20th century until Great Lakes cruises went out of favour due to the introduction of cars. As of 1903, there was a beach, 100-room hotel, 6- to 8-room cottages, a dining hall, and sports and amusements. Transport to the island was via Star Line Steamers with rail transit available to the mainland dock. By 1906, another hotel had been built and a pavilion was advertised with a dining room and ball room. (It's not clear if this was an upgrade to the dining hall mentioned initially, or if it was an additional food establishment.) One of these facilities was called "La Salle Hall". Products sold in the dining hall were also offered for purchase at Island Farm. All park buildings by then had electric lighting and drinking water. A total of 23 cottages were available. Amusements included croquet, tennis, bowling, bathing, boating, and fishing - with accessories and a guide provided.

The island fell on harder times after World War I. Although season rates were up to $150, the hotel base rates were $1.00 - $1.50 per day and as low as only $8 per week in 1921. The following year, the park came under new management. Still, business must have declined because cottages and land began to be offered for sale in the area, many at bargain rates. A July 2, 1925, ad states "At Stag Island - 10 Cottages to Rent". Ads on July 12 and July 19 still offered cottages. Although this was for weekends, it shows that accommodations not available in previous years that late after the start of the season, were able to be rented. However, a roller coaster was built there around 1928.

Canadian astronaut, Chris Hadfield, in the introduction to his book, An Astronaut's Guide to Life on Earth, mentions staying at the family summer cottage on Stag Island when he was 9 years old, when very late in the evening of July 20, 1969 he watched Neil Armstrong step on the surface of the Moon. He knew, "with absolute clarity" that he wanted to be an astronaut.
