= You Are Here: Around the World in 92 Minutes =

2014 photo book by Chris Hadfield

- First edition cover
- Author: Chris Hadfield
- Language: English
- Subject: International Space Station, space photography
- Genre: Non-fiction, photo books
- Publisher: Little, Brown and Company
- Publication date: October 14, 2014
- Publication place: Canada
- Media type: Hardback
- Pages: 208
- ISBN: 978-0-316-37963-2

You Are Here: Around the World in 92 Minutes: Photographs from the International Space Station is a 2014 non-fiction photo book by Canadian retired astronaut and writer Chris Hadfield. It is Hadfield's second book, and was first published in October 2014 in the United States by Little, Brown and Company, and in the United Kingdom by Pan Macmillan.

You Are Here features a selection of photographs Hadfield took of Earth from the International Space Station between December 2012 and May 2013. The book was a New York Times bestseller in November 2014. In May 2014, the Professional Photographers of Canada (PPOC) awarded Hadfield an honorary Service of Photographic Arts designation for the photographs he took from the space station. The presentation of the award featured in the June 2014 issue of the PPOC Gallerie magazine.

== Background ==
During Hadfield's five-month mission aboard the International Space Station (ISS) between December 2012 and May 2013, he took 45,000 photographs of Earth from the ISS's Cupola observation dome. He told Space.com that he loved the view of Earth from 400 kilometres (250 miles) in orbit, and often spent his free time in the dome taking photographs. While in space, Hadfield posted some of these images on social media, but most of them he never had a chance to look at until he returned to Earth at the end of the mission. He began sorting and categorizing the pictures, and selected 150 for publication in You Are Here.

Hadfield said many of the pictures in the book are abstract images of the planet, but have a "human element", something people can relate to. For example, the photograph of the flooded Rio Tietê in Brazil looks like a huge millipede. He said that he wanted the book to show what Earth looked like from space, that it is "an immense, natural, ancient and extremely unique place". He explained that when you orbit the planet every 92 minutes, "you get a much greater sense of the continuity and the connected nature of it", and that our own little piece of Earth we call home is not "sacred or unique".

== Critical reception ==
In a review at The Space Review, Jeff Foust wrote that while there are many pictures of Earth on social media and the internet, You Are Here is a "thoughtful presentation" of high-quality images taken from space. Foust said the book is a "light read" with many eye-catching pictures. He noted that Hadfield's interest in pareidolia is evident here in the way he sees shapes of objects in many of the images of landforms in the book.

Clifford R. McMurray stated that Hadfield "invites you to change your perspective on our home planet". Reviewing You Are Here for the National Space Society, McMurray said the book's "infinite variety of natural and man-made geometry is a delight on every page". He added that what little text there is, is "thoughtful", but "words aren't the point of a picture book ... if one picture is worth a thousand words, in about an hour you’ll have 200,000 beautiful 'word' in your memory bank."
