= Shuguang (spacecraft) =

Abortive Chinese space program

Shuguang One (Chinese: 曙光一号; pinyin: ShǔGuāng Yī Hào; lit. 'Dawn 1'), meaning "dawn" in Mandarin, also known as Project 714 (Chinese: 七一四工程), was the first crewed spacecraft proposed by China during the late 1960s and early 1970s that was never built. The design was for a two-person capsule similar to the Gemini spacecraft, that could be launched in 1973. Because of financial and political problems, Shuguang was cancelled on 13 May 1972.

== Early development ==
As the Chinese space program developed during the sixties, various proposals for crewed spacecraft were made. Serious planning began in 1966, with initial sub-orbital test flights with animals to be made before a crewed mission. However, shortly after these plans were made, several leading scientists attached to the project were denounced during the Cultural Revolution and subsequently executed, bringing progress to a standstill.

== Planning ==
As the Cold War space race for the Moon between the Soviet Union and the United States reached its climax, the Chinese leaders in direct ideological conflict with the revisionist line of Nikita Khrushchev and therefore competing for the leadership of the communist world, decided not to give up the Moon and outer space to the only two superpowers.

Thus, Chairman Mao Zedong and Zhou Enlai decided on July 14, 1967, to start China's own crewed space program. China first crewed spacecraft was named Shuguang-1 (曙光一号) in January 1968. China's Space Medical Institute (航天医学工程研究所) was founded on 1 April 1968, where space medical research were conducted. The Central Military Commission issued the order of starting the selection of astronauts among the People's Liberation Army Air Force pilots. The criteria of selection were: 1.59 to 1.74 meters high, 24 to 38 years of age, 55 to 70 kg and 300 hours of flight time. At the end of 1969, after two months of selection and after the screening of 1918 pilots, 215 primary candidates were selected. Then a second phase of screening based on flying techniques, psychological, physiological and general medical examination criteria left only 88 candidates remaining. Dedication to Chinese revolutionary political ideas were also a determinant factor. Nineteen astronauts were chosen when the screening process ended on 15 March 1971, including Lu Xiangxiao, Wang Zhiyue, Dong Xiaohai and Fang Guojun. During a conference in April 1971, it was decided that the spacecraft should follow the design of the two-person Gemini craft, and the program was deemed "Project 714" after the year and month of the conference. The astronauts were to begin training in November 1971, with the first mission planned for 1973. The Shuguang craft was developed for this purpose and was planned to be launched on the CZ-2A rocket.

== New Space Center ==
In order to support the Chinese 'Project 714' crewed space program in the 1960s, the construction of a new space center at Xichang in the Sichuan province was decided, located farther from the border with the Soviet Union, thus safer. The 'Shuguang One' spacecraft was expected to be launched from the launch pad number one. After the cancellation of the program the launch pad was never completed. Today a viewing platform for officials has been built at the site.

== Cancellation ==
Due to the secrecy of the project and its low priority within the Chinese government, funding for Project 714 was meager. When Mao himself was asked to allocate more funds towards the project, he declared that the state must be concerned with terrestrial needs first. Because of the lack of funding, the astronauts were released from the project and sent back to their units. On 13 May 1972, the last staff member attached to Project 714 returned to his unit, and the project was officially cancelled. During the late 1970s and 1980s, official announcements were made that China's crewed space program was continuing, however, no significant amount of work was done, and these announcements were only propaganda.

== Design of the Shuguang craft ==
The actual Shuguang vehicle would have closely resembled the Gemini spacecraft, but would have been lighter and smaller to allow it to be launched by the CZ-2A, which had a maximum payload of 3200 kilograms. The two crewmembers would have been seated in a pressurized crew compartment fitted with ejection seats (in case of an abort scenario) and instruments. The aft section of the spacecraft would have been fitted with orientation engines, propellant tanks and other pieces of hardware. The crew section would have separated from the aft section for reentry, which would have been in the form of a splashdown, as there was no soft-landing system designed for the vehicle.

== Legacy ==
Nonetheless, after eight years of development, a fleet of Yuanwang-class space tracking ships for recovery of re-entry vehicles at sea was built. The Space Flight Medical Research Centre was founded in Beijing. Recoverable space capsules of the FSW-class, EVA spacesuits, space food, space tracking stations and radars, astronaut selection process and training and related facilities were developed, laying the ground for the successful Project 921-1 (Shenzhou) that followed three decades later.

== Depictions in fiction ==
In Final Orbit, an alternate history novel by Chris Hadfield, China builds Shuguang and secretly launches its first astronaut into space in 1975.
