= Sandra Magnus =

American astronaut and engineer (born 1964)

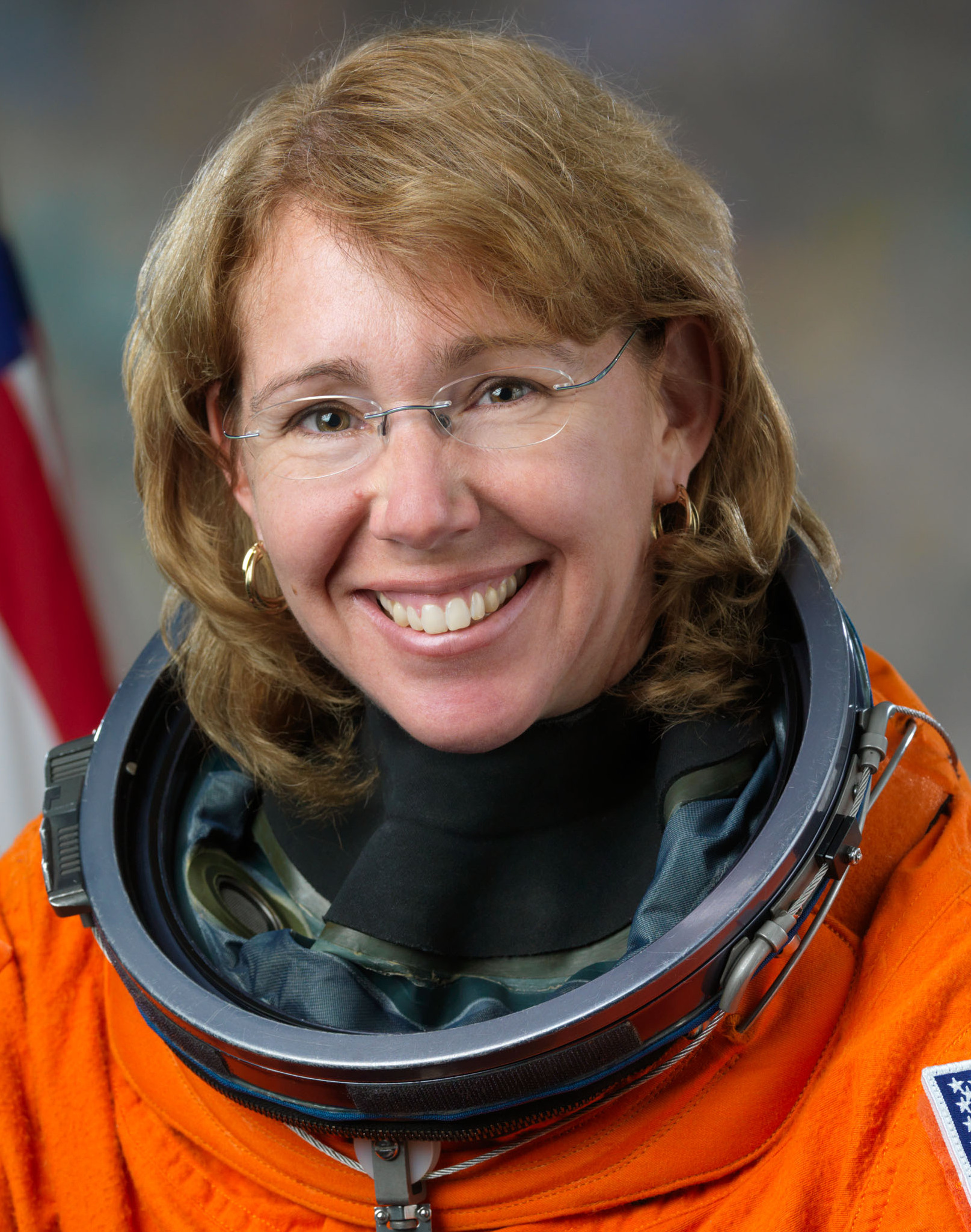
- Magnus in 2011
- Born: October 30, 1964 (age 61); Belleville, Illinois, U.S.
- Education: Missouri University of Science and Technology (BS); Georgia Institute of Technology (MS, PhD)
- Space career

NASA astronaut
- Time in space: 157d 8h 42m
- Selection: NASA Group 16 (1996)
- Mission: STS-112; STS-126/119 (Expedition 18); STS-135
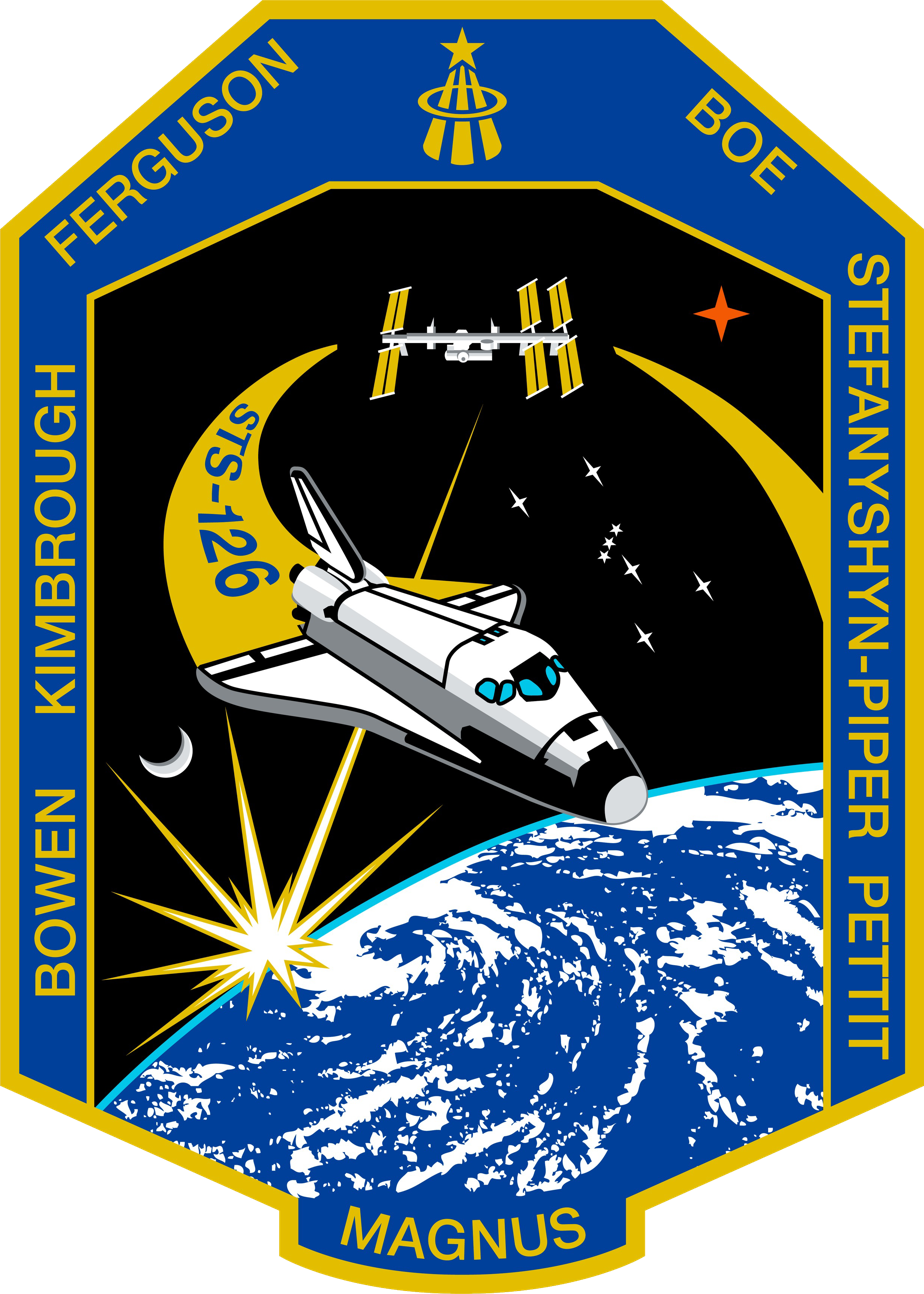
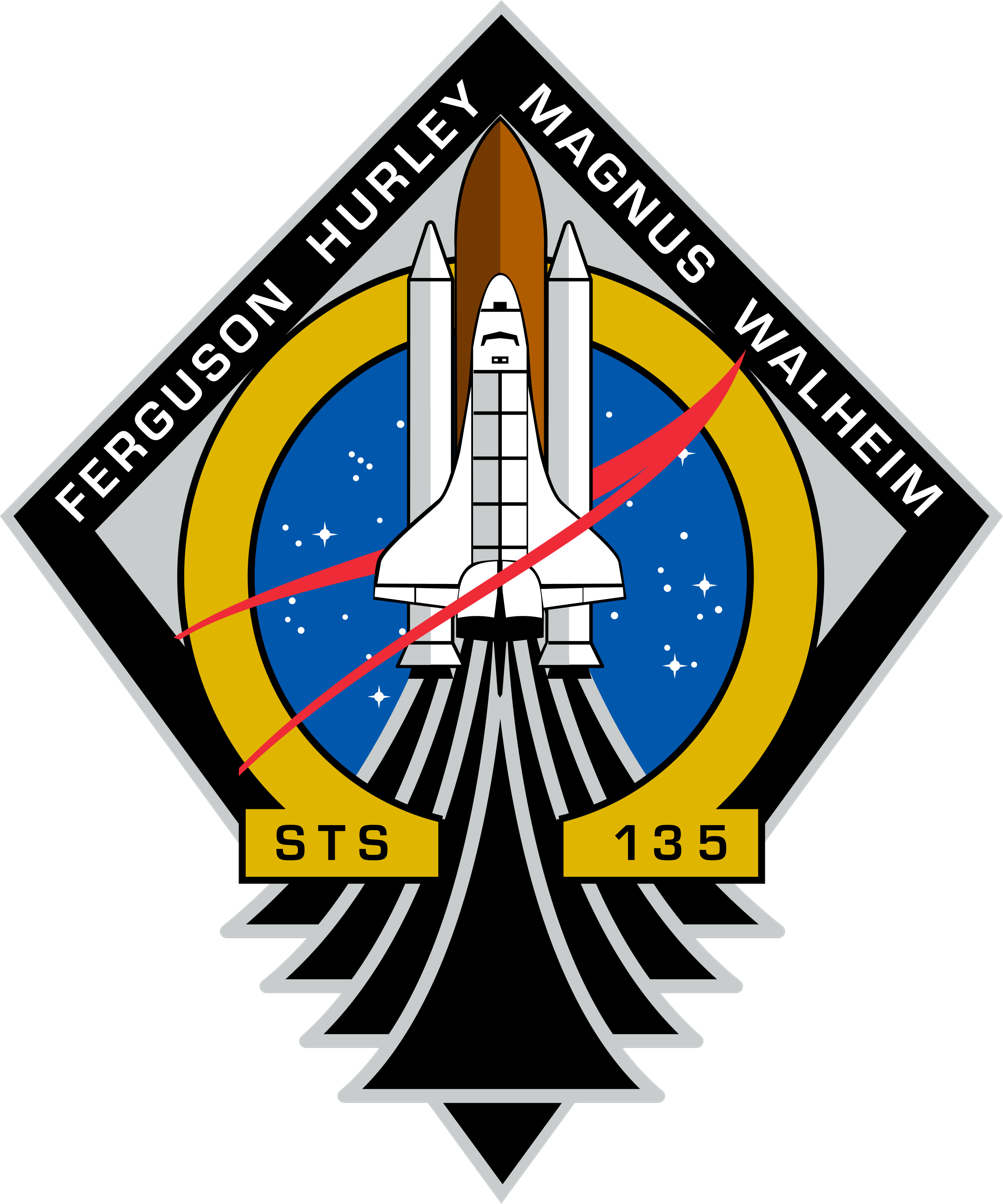
- Mission insignia
- Scientific career
- Fields: Materials science
- Thesis: An Investigation of the Relationship between the Thermochemistry and Emission Behavior of Thermionic Cathodes Based on the BaO-Sc₂O₃-WO₃ Ternary System (1996)
- Doctoral advisor: Norman Hill

Sandra Hall Magnus (born October 30, 1964) is an American engineer and a former NASA astronaut. She flew to space three times, as mission specialist on STS-112, as ISS crewmember during Expedition 18 and as mission specialist on STS-135. She was also a licensed amateur radio operator with the call sign KE5FYE though that callsign has since expired. From 2012 until 2018 Magnus was the executive director of the American Institute of Aeronautics and Astronautics.

== Biography ==
=== Early life and education ===
Magnus was born and raised in Belleville, Illinois. She earned degrees in physics and electrical engineering from the University of Missouri–Rolla (now known as the Missouri University of Science and Technology) before earning a PhD in materials science and engineering from the Georgia Institute of Technology in 1996. Research for her dissertation, entitled "An Investigation of the relationship between the thermochemistry and emission behavior of thermionic cathodes based on the BaO-Sc_{2}O_{3}-WO_{3} ternary system," was supported by a fellowship from the NASA Lewis Research Center.

=== Engineering career ===
During the 1980s, Magnus worked on stealth aircraft design as an engineer for McDonnell Douglas. She worked on the propulsion system for the A-12 Avenger II until the project was canceled by the Navy in 1991.

=== NASA career ===
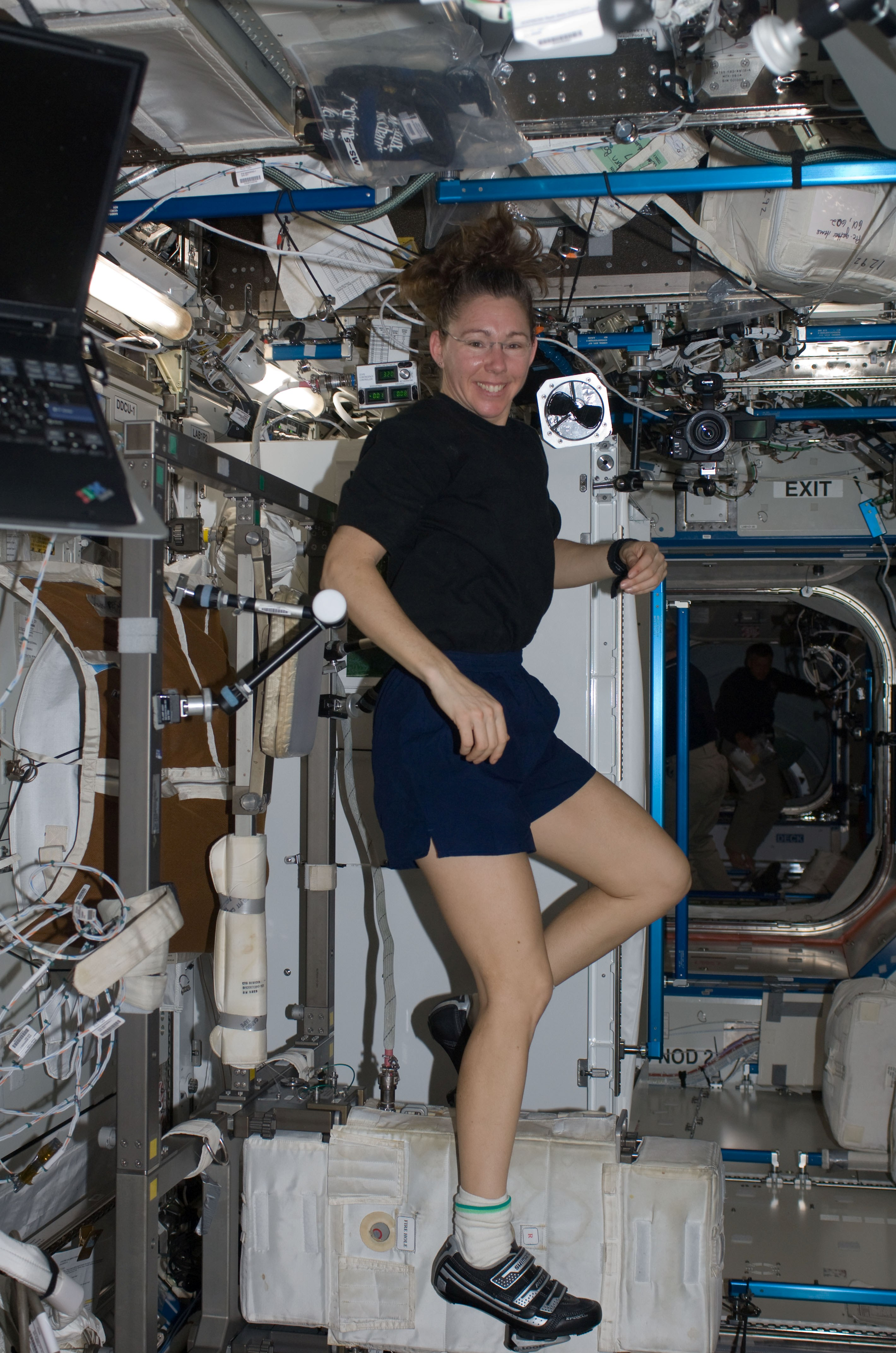
Sandra Magnus, STS-119 mission specialist, exercises on the Cycle Ergometer with Vibration Isolation System (CEVIS) in the Destiny laboratory.

Magnus was selected as an astronaut candidate in 1996. Following training for two years from January 1997 until May 1998, Magnus was assigned to the Payloads/Habitability branch in the Astronaut office. Her work included coordinating with the European Space Agency and the Development Agency of Japan (NASDA) and Brazil. In May 1998 she was assigned to work in Russia supporting payload hardware development and testing. In 2000 she was CAPCOM for the International Space Station.

==== STS-112 ====
She flew her first space mission, STS-112, in October 2002 as a mission specialist. The main objective of Space Shuttle Atlantis' mission was the installation of the S1 truss section on the International Space Station (ISS) and consumables delivery. Magnus operated the space station's robotic arm during the three spacewalks required to install and activate the S1 truss. The flight duration was 10 days 19 hours 58 minutes and 44 seconds.

==== Survival training ====
From January 29–31, 2006, together with Oleg Artemiev and Michael Barratt, Magnus took part in a two-day examination for the ability to survive in an uninhabited area in case of the Soyuz descent module making an emergency landing. She passed this examination in the forest near Moscow.

==== NEEMO 11 ====
From September 16–22, 2006, Magnus served as the commander of NASA's NEEMO 11 mission, an undersea expedition at the National Oceanic and Atmospheric Administration's Aquarius laboratory located off the coast of Florida. With fellow astronaut/aquanauts Timothy Kopra, Robert Behnken and Timothy Creamer, all of whom were training for possible assignment to missions to the International Space Station, Magnus imitated moonwalks, tested concepts for mobility using various spacesuit configurations and weights to simulate lunar gravity. Techniques for communication, navigation, geological sample retrieval, construction and using remote-controlled robots on the Moon's surface also were tested. National Undersea Research Center support crew members Larry Ward and Roger Garcia provided engineering support inside the habitat.

==== Expedition 18 ====
Magnus served as flight engineer on board the International Space Station as part of Expedition 18. Magnus was a mission specialist on STS-126 for the trip to the station, which launched on November 14, 2008. She served as mission specialist on STS-119 when it returned on March 28, 2009. She logged 133 days in orbit and received warm greetings from NASA on her return. Her replacement, JAXA astronaut Koichi Wakata, was launched aboard Discovery on March 15, 2009.

==== STS-135 ====
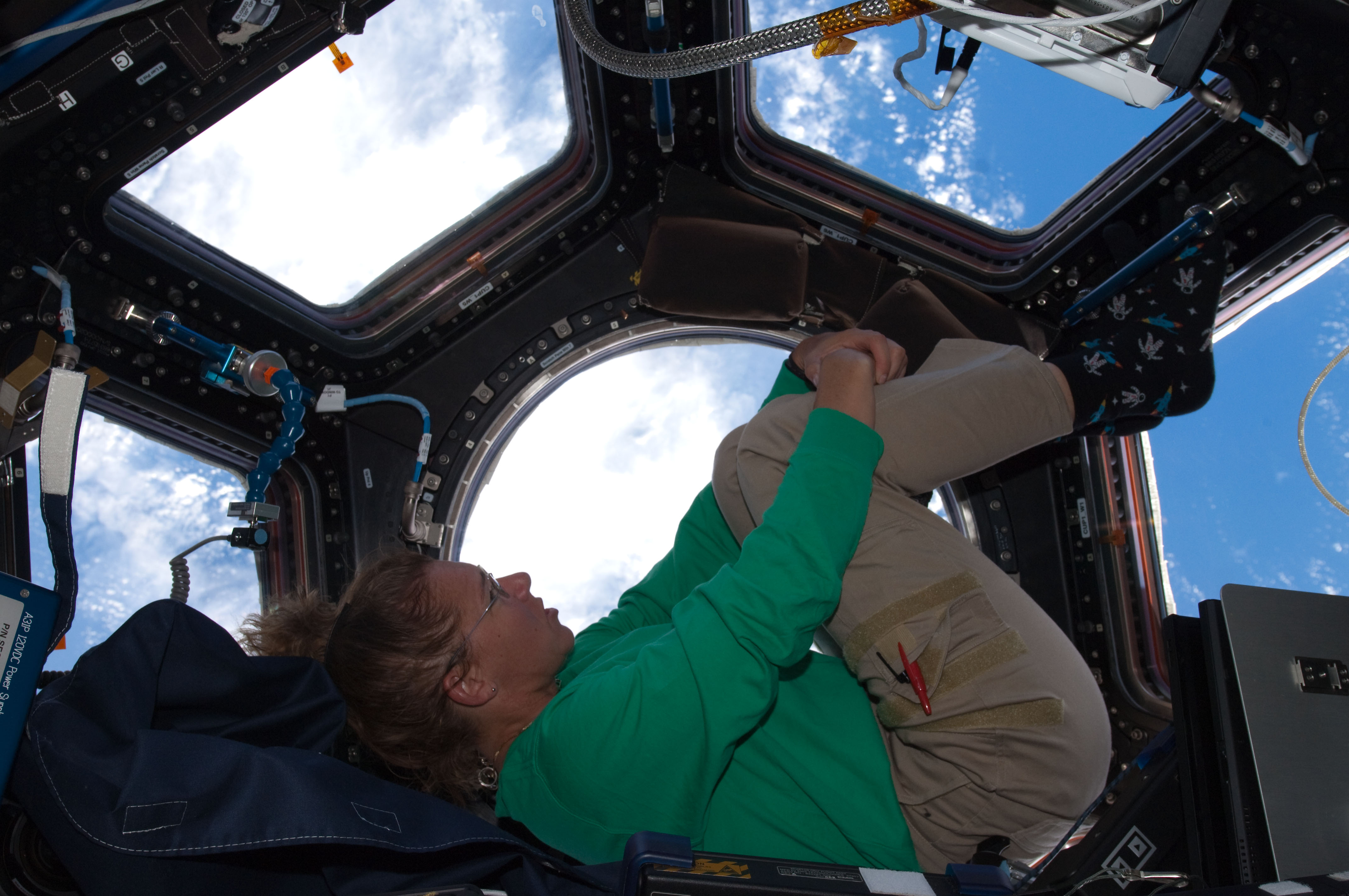
Magnus in the Cupola aboard the International Space Station during STS-135.

On September 14, 2010, NASA announced Magnus to be one of four astronauts assigned to the STS-135 "launch on need" crew that was, if needed, to fly a rescue mission for STS-134, which was originally the last scheduled shuttle flight. Other members assigned to that crew were commander Christopher Ferguson, pilot Douglas G. Hurley, and fellow mission specialist Rex J. Walheim. In January 2011, NASA added STS-135 to the manifest as the final Space Shuttle mission, scheduled to launch in July 2011; STS-134 was conducted successfully in May 2011, requiring no rescue flight. The mission launched successfully on 8 July 2011 and landed on July 21.

In September 2012, Magnus became deputy Chief of the Astronaut Office.

=== After NASA ===
In October 2012, Magnus left NASA Astronaut corps to become the executive director of the American Institute of Aeronautics and Astronautics (AIAA). She was the executive director until January 2018.

From 2018 to 2019, Magnus was a principal at AstroPlanetView. In 2019, she became the deputy director for Engineering within the Office of the Under Secretary of Defense for Research and Engineering, serving under former NASA Administrator Michael Griffin.

On February 9, 2021, Virgin Galactic announced that Magnus would be joining their Space Advisory Board to help "provide advice to senior management as the company moves forward to open space for the benefit of all." Magnus will be joined by former astronaut Chris Hadfield and Chief Scientist of Cubic Corporation David A. Whelan.
