= Dave Hadfield =

David Hadfield
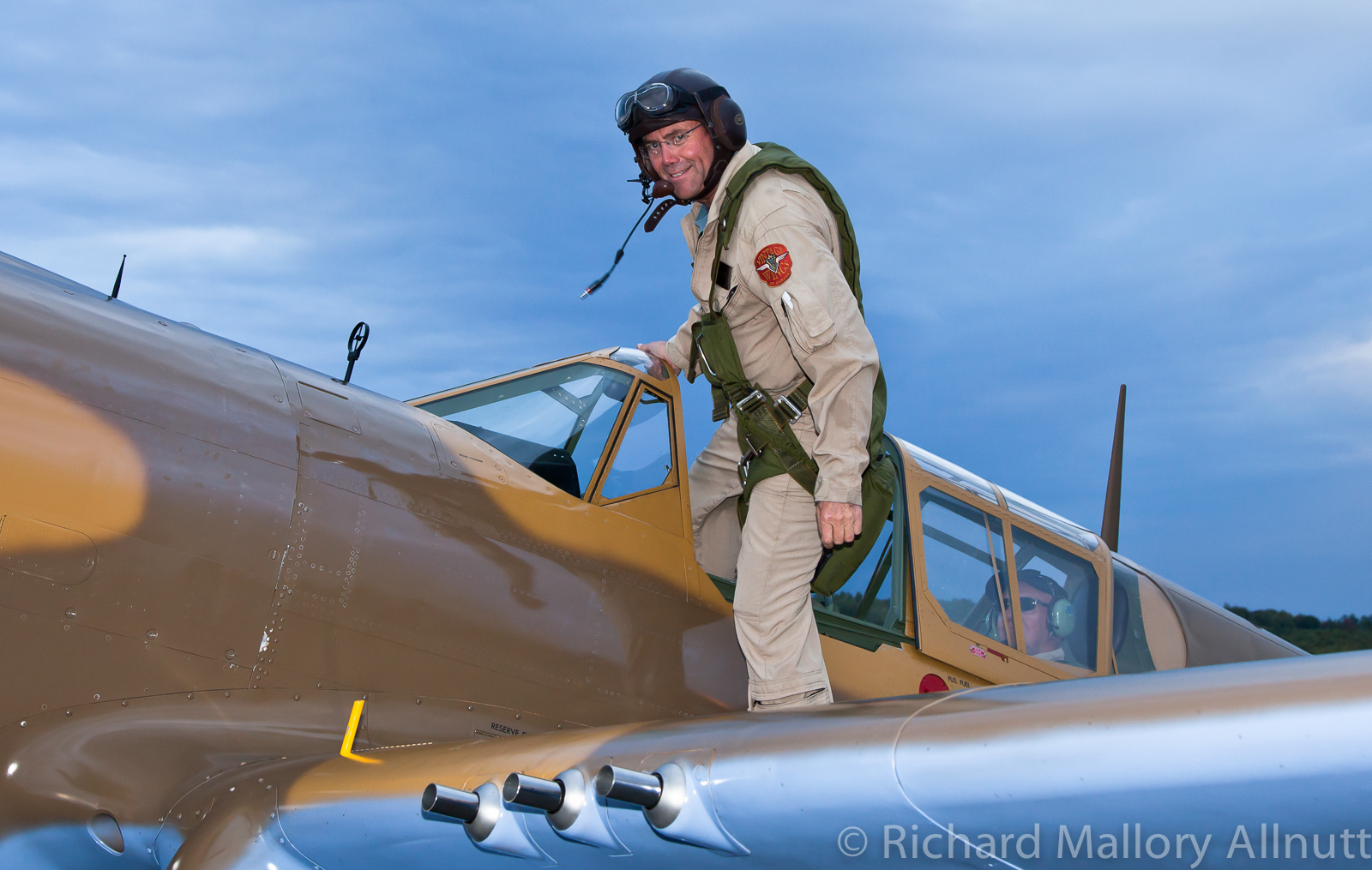
- Dave Hadfield mounting the Curtiss P-40N Kittyhawk C-FVWC of Vintage Wings of Canada. In the back seat is Frank Waywell, a WWII Kittyhawk pilot who flew them in N. Africa.
- Born: July 1957 (age 69); Galt, Ontario, Canada
- Relatives: Chris Hadfield (brother)
- Website: hadfield.ca

David Hadfield, born 1957 in Galt, Ontario (now Cambridge, Ontario) is a Canadian singer/songwriter, author, wilderness adventurer, historic aircraft pilot, and classic-boat sailor. He shares writing credits on the album Songs From a Tin Can, recorded by his brother Commander Chris Hadfield, which is the first album of music recorded off the planet Earth.

== Music ==
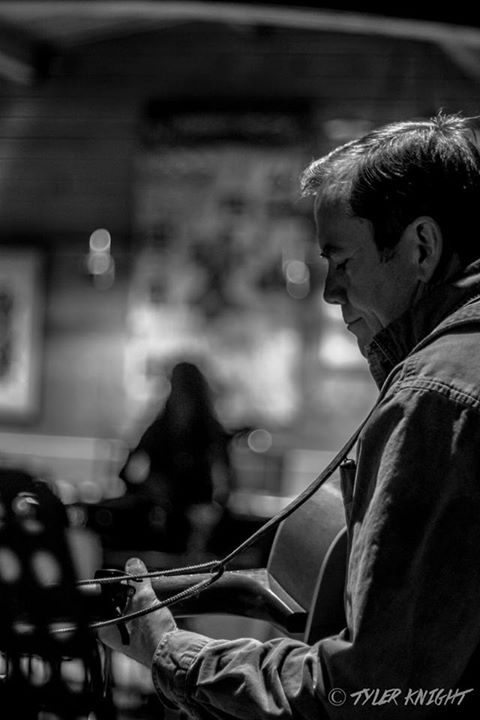
Dave Hadfield playing guitar

Hadfield is known for his wilderness songs. These are largely story-songs, many focusing on historical themes. Some are humorous or satiric (eg."Riley’s Bait", "Victor’s Cabin").

In 2012, Hadfield's song "Jewel in the Night", a "space-carol" was adapted and recorded by his brother Chris Hadfield while on board the International Space Station , and released on Christmas Eve. This was the first of Chris’ recordings from Space, and is the first song deliberately recorded and distributed from space for the purposes of an album. In 2014, Hadfield's song "In Canada", performed and filmed with Chris at the family cottage, was released on Canada Day (July 1), and gained 1M hits in 2 1/2 days on YouTube. It has since received almost 4M views. Hadfield is also front man for the Barrie ON-based band "The Purveyors", which is known for mixing Hadfield's original songs with modern and traditional Celtic music. Canadian author and filmmaker Kevin Callan often uses Hadfield's music for film scores, including "Learning to Laugh at Yourself in Algoma" (2008), which won Best Humorous Short at the Waterwalker Film Festival that year, and "The Haunted Coburg Jail". So does historian/presenter James Raffan, and Rolf Kraiker.

Hadfield has been performing a solo multi-media show called "Songs, Slides and Stories", in which he presents images or video about his songs, tells a short story about their background, and then plays. He appeared at 14 venues in 2019.

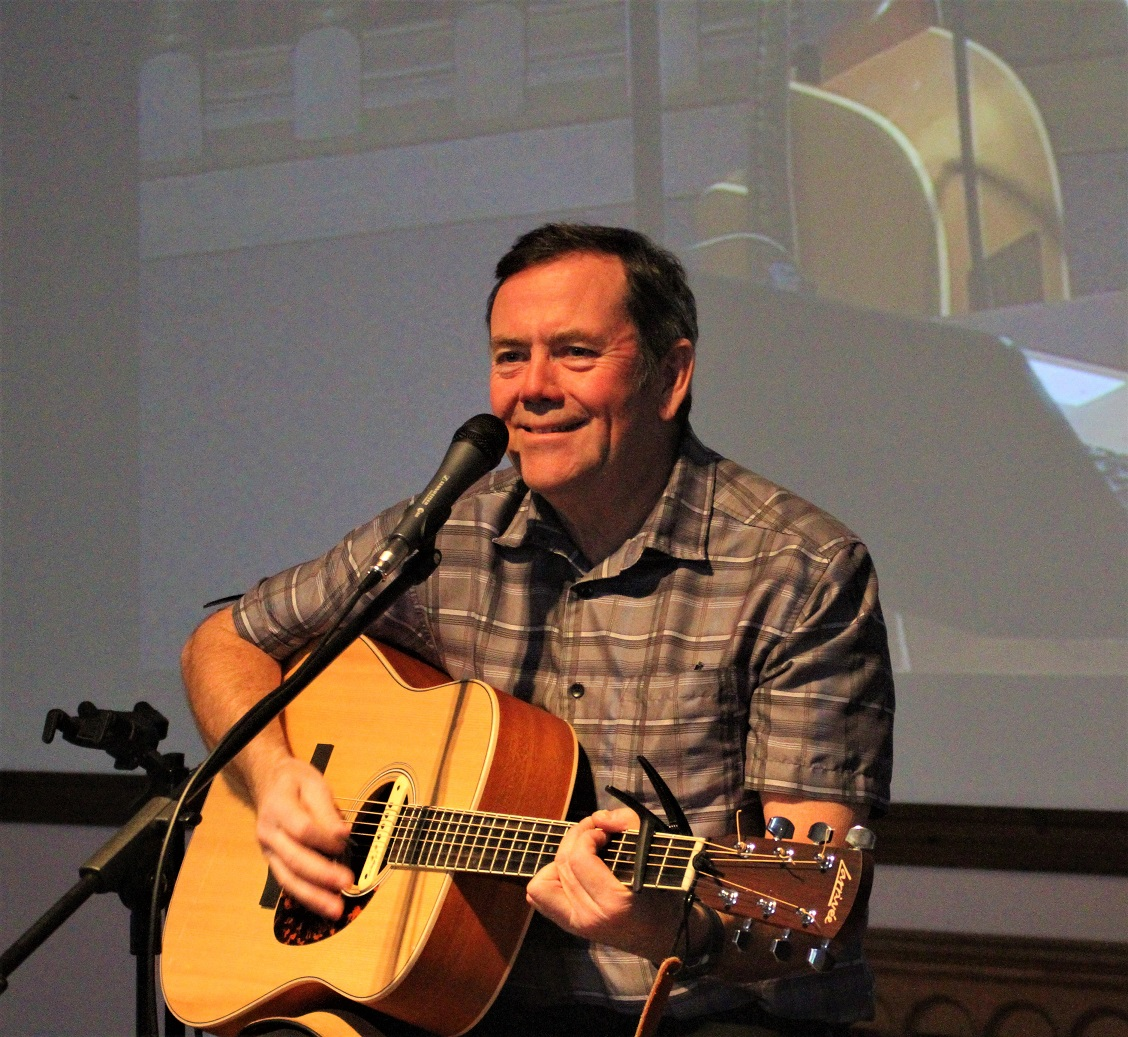
Songs, Slides and Stories with Dave Hadfield

== Discography ==
- Northern Breeze, 1997; an 8-song collection on wilderness subjects
- Wilderness Waltz, 2000; a 12-song collection on wilderness subjects
- The Skin I’m In, 2007; a 14-song album on a wide variety of subjects
- Climbin' Away, 2018; a 14-song collection on flying.

== Shared projects ==
- Space Sessions: Songs From a Tin Can, 2015; by Chris Hadfield

== Wilderness ==
Hadfield travelled widely in the Canadian Shield of NE Manitoba as a young man. He is a noted winter Bush traveller as well as a canoeist, and has publicized his methods and gear in print articles and internet sites. He has used modern materials to re-create many items of traditional bush gear, such as prospector tents, portable wood-burning cook stoves, hand-hauled sleds of various kinds, wannigans, etc. These have been published in how-to articles. Wilderness trips have formed the subject material for many of his songs.

== Pilot ==
In addition to having been a Boeing 777 Captain for a major Canadian airline, Hadfield is a Chief Pilot with the Mike Potter Aircraft Collection, in association with Vintage Wings of Canada, Gatineau, Quebec, and flies many Warbird types such as the Supermarine Spitfire, Hawker Hurricane, Westland Lysander, and P-51 Mustang . He performs aerobatic airshow displays in the P-40 Kittyhawk fighter, and owns several aircraft. In the summer of 2018, Hadfield flew Spitfire TE-294 from Gatineau Q.C. to Comox BC and back, in a program called "5,000 Miles In A Spitfire". He has published over 50 helmet-cam cockpit videos of flying rare and vintage aircraft. He comes from a flying family, eight of whom are pilots, including Commander Chris Hadfield. His flying career has been the subject of mainstream aviation articles such as Aeroplane His wife Robin Hadfield is an Air Race and Rally pilot, and is (2024) President of the Ninety-Nines.

== Videographer ==
Using helmet-cam as a primary source, Hadfield has produced over 50 flying videos featuring rare and historic aircraft such as the Spitfire, P-40 and Lysander. Many of these are in the how-to vein, with Hadfield supplying voice-over narration. The tips and tricks required to fly these unusual aircraft, some in airshow performances, are a recurring theme. Hadfield has also produced videos illustrating his wilderness travelling techniques.

== Author ==
Hadfield authored a "how-to" column in an outdoor magazine (Bushwhacker) from 1997 to 2001, which encouraged wilderness enthusiasts how to make and use old-fashioned camping gear for winter and summer. These articles are being put together in e-book format, with a projected publication date of 2025. He has also published articles in mainstream aviation, and sailing, magazines, as well in internet special-interest forums.

== Sailor ==
Hadfield has restored and sails a classic 46 ft wooden (1947) ketch sailboat in the Great Lakes. Voyages on these lakes have formed the basis of his sailing articles, and some of his songs. He is also a designer and builder of canoes and dinghies, primarily working with plywood and epoxy.

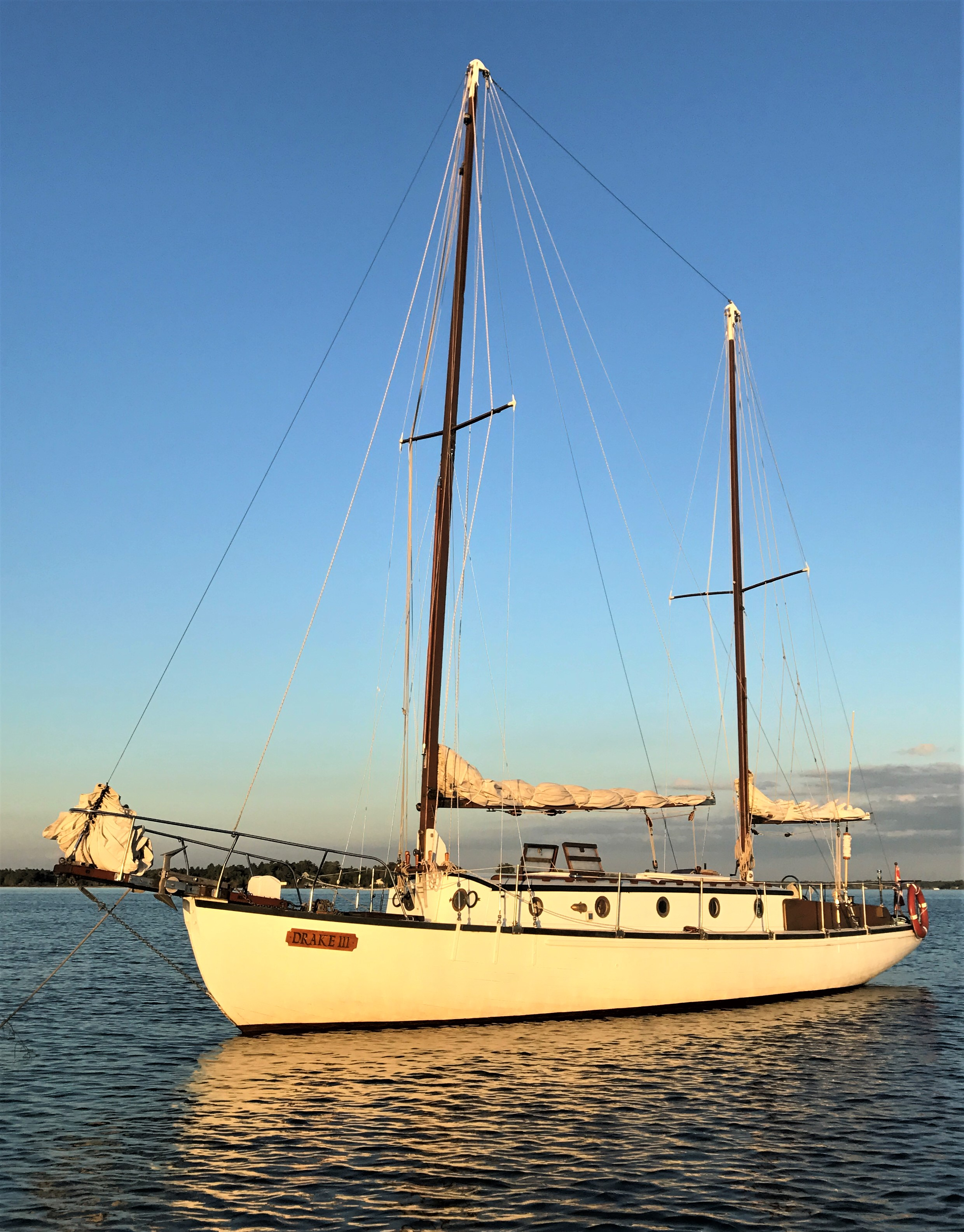
1947 ketch Drake III

== Family ==
He is married to Robin Hadfield who in May 2022 was elected President of the Ninety-Nines, an international women's flying organization. Hadfield has two children, Austin Hadfield, an airline Captain in Canada, and Dr. Kelly Hadfield, founder and executive director of Ghana Medical Help, an NGO charity providing medical supplies and training to remote hospitals in Ghana, Africa.
