= Final Orbit =

2025 novel by Chris Hadfield

- First edition cover
- Author: Chris Hadfield
- Language: English
- Series: The Apollo Murders
- Genre: Alternate history; Thriller
- Publisher: Little, Brown and Company
- Publication date: October 7, 2025
- Publication place: Canada
- Media type: Hardback
- Pages: 416
- ISBN: 978-0-316-58168-4
- Preceded by: The Defector

Final Orbit is a 2025 alternate history, thriller novel by Canadian retired astronaut and writer Chris Hadfield. It was first published in October 2025 in the United States by Little, Brown and Company, and in the United Kingdom by Quercus. The book is Hadfield's third novel in his Apollo Murders series, the first two being The Apollo Murders in 2021, and The Defector in 2023.

Final Orbit is set in an alternate 1975 and centers around the American-Soviet Apollo–Soyuz space mission. The novel includes a number of historical figures from the period, including US president Gerald Ford and Chinese chairman Mao Zedong. Hadfield stated that "almost everything in "Final Orbit" is real".

== Background ==
Final Orbit revolves around the historic 1975 American-Soviet Apollo–Soyuz space mission, and is set against the backdrop of the abandoned American space station, Skylab, and Gerald Ford replacing Richard Nixon as US president. Hadfield said he wanted the book to be in chronological sequence with the two previous novels in the Apollo Murders series. Looking for a third player in the American-Soviet Space Race, he decided to add China after discovering the pivotal role Qian Xuesen had played in the development of Chinese aerospace. Hadfield explained that Xuesen was an American-Chinese scientist who joined Operation Paperclip after World War II to assess Nazi rocket scientists. But America lost Xuesen's expertise when they deported him during the McCarthy era, and he went on to develop China's space program.

Hadfield stated in October 2025 that he has drafted an outline for a fourth book in the Apollo Murders series. He also said that he is considering writing a prequel on Kaz Zemeckis, a central character in all three Apollo Murders books. He said in an interview with Space.com: "Kaz is the personification of so many of my fighter pilot, test pilot, astronaut friends. But at the same time he got punted to the sidelines by an uncontrollable medical thing, but now the life that he's leading is, if anything, more interesting and it gives me a lot of latitude for where I can take the plot next."

== Plot summary ==
In an alternate 1975, Apollo and Soyuz capsules dock with each other in the historic Apollo–Soyuz space mission. The Americans and the Soviets have three astronauts and three cosmonauts respectively. US president Gerald Ford congratulates the crew from Mission Control in Houston, but as he prepares to leave, an assassination attempt is made on his life, followed by an explosion outside the building. Ford is only slightly injured, but the explosion has knocked out communications with the Apollo and Soyuz capsules in orbit. The Weather Underground, funded by Chinese activists in America, is responsible for the bombing and assassination attempt. In Earth orbit, disaster strikes the Apollo–Soyuz mission when a depressurization accident in the Soyuz capsule kills a cosmonaut and two astronauts. The three remaining crew members in the Apollo module are astronaut Deke Slayton, and cosmonauts Svetlana Gromova and Valery Kubasov. In Houston, Kazimieras "Kaz" Zemeckis is Mission Control's CAPCOM, and he has his hands full trying to cope with the situation on the ground and in space.

Houston calculates that the dead crew members in orbit cannot be brought back to Earth in the Apollo capsule as they will add too much weight for reentry. It is decided that they must be taken to the abandoned American Skylab space station where they can be picked up later by a Space Shuttle. Having reestablished contact with the capsule, Kaz informs the remaining crew of Houston's plan, but also alerts Slayton to the presence of a classified particle-beam weapon from Project Seesaw aboard Skylab. (Note: Project Seesaw was an initiative by the US Advanced Research Projects Agency between the late 1950s and early 1970s to develop a particle-beam weapon to destroy missiles. But problems were encountered and the project was abandoned. The idea was revisited in the 1980s as President Ronald Reagan's "Star Wars" Strategic Defense Initiative.) As the Apollo capsule approaches Skylab, it is hit by a Chinese spacecraft that has made an expected appearance. The Apollo craft's main antennae are damaged, which hampers communication with Houston. Earlier, under the direction of Chinese aerospace engineer Qian Xuesen and Chairman Mao Zedong, China had secretly launched its first taikonaut, Fang Kuo-chun into space in a Shuguang spacecraft. (Note: The Chinese space program began in the 1960s, and the first crewed spacecraft, Shuguang One ("First Dawn") was proposed in the early 1970s. The project was cancelled by Mao Zedong in 1972 because of funding and political problems, and the spacecraft was never built.)

It becomes clear that Fang's goal is to steal the classified American technology from Skylab. A battle ensues aboard Skylab between the Apollo crew and Fang, and Fang escapes with the weapon in his capsule. The Apollo capsule and the three crewmembers return to Earth safely, but the Shuguang spacecraft disintegrates while re-entering the Earth's atmosphere due to damaged heat shields caused by the earlier collision with the Apollo capsule. In Houston, Kaz has been investigating the local Chinese involvement in the bombing and the assassination attempt. He discovers that Doctor Jimmy Doi, flight surgeon on Houston's medical team and trusted colleague and friend, has been spying for China. After a scuffle in Mission Control, Doi is arrested. It is later established that Doi revealed to China the existence of the US particle beam weapon aboard Skylab.

== Critical reception ==
In a review of Final Orbit in Library Journal, Cynde Suite described Hadfield's third Apollo Murders novel as an "[a]ction-filled, believable drama". She said the technical details are enjoyable to read, and compared the book's "realism" to those of Isaac Asimov and Andy Weir. In Booklist, David Pitt wrote that Final Orbit takes place "in a vividly realized historical period." He called Hadfield "a terrific storyteller", and described the novel's narrative as a "seamless" mix of real and fictional events, and characters. Publishers Weekly called Final Orbit "a pulse-pounding adventure". The reviewer stated that despite the book's "technical jargon", which they felt "crowds the narrative", and the "undernourished ... earthbound subplots", Hadfield keeps the suspense going until a "crackling finale".

Jacob Aron wrote in New Scientist that Final Orbit is "both technical and entertaining". He said Hadfield is "a master of the genre", and described the book's "space conflict" as "the most realistic depiction of a 'battle' between two spacecraft ever written". Reviewing the book in The Irish Times, Declan Burke stated that Final Orbit is "a superbly detailed account of the real-life mission". But Burke did feel that it tends to be "an overly busy story", with the fictional side "grow[ing] increasingly improbable". In The Historical Novels Review, Aidan K. Morrissey described Final Orbit as "a gripping blend of historical fiction, political intrigue, and edge-of-your-seat thriller". He said Hadfield's strength is his ability to weave historical figures into fictional narrative, making his stories both realistic and plausible. Morrissey stated that Final Orbit is more than a "space thriller", "it's a sobering reminder of how quickly global cooperation can turn to conflict, especially when secrets, suspicion, and silence reign."
