= The Darkest Dark =

2016 picture book by Chris Hadfield

- First edition cover
- Author: Chris Hadfield
- Illustrators: Terry and Eric Fan
- Cover artist: Terry and Eric Fan
- Language: English
- Subject: The Moon, fear of the dark
- Genre: Children's literature
- Publisher: Little, Brown and Company
- Publication date: September 13, 2016
- Publication place: Canada
- Media type: Hardback
- Pages: 48
- ISBN: 978-0-316-39472-7

The Darkest Dark is a 2016 Children's picture book by Canadian retired astronaut and writer Chris Hadfield, illustrated by Terry and Eric Fan, and with contributions by Kate Fillion. (Note: Kate Fillion is credited on the title page of The Darkest Dark, but not on the book cover.) The Darkest Dark is Hadfield's third book and his debut picture book. It was first published in September 2016 in the United States by Little, Brown and Company, and in the United Kingdom by Pan Macmillan.

The Darkest Dark was a finalist for the 2017 Marilyn Baillie Picture Book Award, the 2017 Ruth and Sylvia Schwartz Children's Book Award, and the 2018 Blue Spruce Award.

== Background ==
The 1969 Apollo 11 Moon landing was a pivotal moment in Hadfield's life, and he wanted to share it with children and provide inspiration on overcoming fear. Hadfield told Space.com that "just because you're afraid doesn't mean you have to stop". He added that "within your own fears, sometimes, lies great opportunity, and that you can turn yourself into something that you're dreaming about".

Hadfield explained how "iterative" producing a children's picture book is. The writer and artist often have different perceptions of what the book will look like, and they each have to make adjustments to their work to get it to flow correctly. Hadfield said, "it's both very delightful and very painstaking to get right."

== Plot summary ==
Chris is a young boy who pretends to be an astronaut. He travels to Mars and the Moon, and saves Earth from aliens. But Chris has trouble sleeping at night – he is afraid of the dark. Then one day he watches the Apollo 11 Moon landing on TV, and sees real astronauts walking on the Moon. For the first time Chris sees how dark space is, "the darkest dark ever" and much darker than his room is at night. Chris is enchanted by this and is no longer afraid.

== Critical reception ==
Peter Spasov wrote in a review for the National Space Society that The Darkest Dark is "an adventurous yarn" both young and old can enjoy. It centers around the Apollo 11 Moon landing, which for children is excitement, adventure and overcoming fears, and for parents and grandparents, nostalgia, and the opportunity to pass their memories onto their children. Spasov said, "In the truest sense of the word, the book can be a gift".

Reviewing The Darkest Dark in The Deakin Review of Children's Literature, Hanne Pearce called it a "touching story" that is "simple in many respects", but "singularly inspiring". She wrote that Terry and Eric Fan's illustrations are "remarkably rich in detail", with "subtle colours and contrasting dark tones [that] bring a young child's imagination to life". Pearce stated that this is an ideal book for four to twelve-year-old children, "especially those interested in space or experiencing fear of the dark".

Eleen Heaney called The Darkest Dark "a very personal story". In a review in CM: Canadian Review of Materials she said it has biographical elements in it, but also valuable insight into overcoming childhood fears. Heaney stated that the book comes "highly recommended" for its "artistic merit" and its allusions to "the life [of] an important contemporary Canadian".

Kirkus Reviews called The Darkest Dark an "uplifting, valuable addition to the 'scared of the dark' bookshelf". The reviewer described the artwork as "stunning", and the illustrations "[f]ull of rich texture and value, with captivating compositions and hidden hints". But they did feel that the rendering of Chis' face was a little too "generic", considering the "meticulous detailing surrounding it". A review of the book in Publishers Weekly noted the ease with which The Fan Brothers handle both fantasy illustrations and documentary pictures (the Moon landing). The reviewer stated: "The idea that a famous astronaut was once afraid of the dark may win some recalcitrant bed-goers' hearts".

== Stage adaptation ==
The Darkest Dark was adapted for the stage by Jim Millan and Ian MacIntyre, and directed by Millan. The production was first proposed to the Young People's Theatre in Toronto in 2017, and after five years in development, the adaptation premiered at the Young People's Theatre in February 2023. Welsh actor Ziska Louis played the role of Chris. The production returned to the Young People's Theatre for a second season in February and March 2025.
