= The Defector (Hadfield novel) =

2023 novel by Chris Hadfield

- First edition cover
- Author: Chris Hadfield
- Language: English
- Series: The Apollo Murders
- Genre: Alternate history; Thriller
- Publisher: Little, Brown and Company
- Publication date: October 10, 2023
- Publication place: Canada
- Media type: Hardback
- Pages: 568
- ISBN: 978-0-316-56502-8
- Preceded by: The Apollo Murders
- Followed by: Final Orbit

The Defector is a 2023 alternate history, thriller novel by Canadian retired astronaut and writer Chris Hadfield. It was first published in October 2023 in the United States by Little, Brown and Company, and in the United Kingdom by Quercus. The book is Hadfield's second novel in his Apollo Murders series, the first being The Apollo Murders in 2021, and followed later by Final Orbit in 2025.

The Defector is set in 1973 during the Cold War, and is about a Soviet pilot who defects to the United States with his MiG-25 supersonic jet. The novel includes several historical figures from the period, and Hadfield has stated that many of the events that take place in the book are real.

== Background ==
Whereas Hadfield's previous novel, The Apollo Murders drew largely on his experiences as an astronaut, The Defector draws heavily on his time as a test pilot and a Canadian fighter pilot during the Cold War. Hadfield said on several occasions he intercepted Soviet bombers entering Canadian airspace. "That's what was part of my professional career [at the time], but that's at the core of The Defector".

Hadfield stated that The Defector is based on real events, and that 95% of the people, places and hardware in the book are real. The descriptions of the "mysterious high-security" Area 51 in the book are also real, including where the American F-15 jet fighter was tested, and where Soviet MiG aircraft and defectors were housed. Hadfield said on the Canadian radio program, The Current, "you're going to have a hard time figuring out ... what of this is even made up? Because everything in it, as much as I could possibly do, is real."

== Plot summary ==
On the eve of the Yom Kippur War in October 1973, Soviet Air Force pilot Alexander Vasilyevich Abramovich, call sign "Grief", lands his MiG-25 supersonic jet at Israel's Lod airport, and requests to defect to the United States. Israel, knowing that the Americans would be eager to get their hands on the latest Soviet fighter plane, exchanges Grief and his plane for much needed military hardware from the Americans to repel the upcoming Syrian and Egyptian attack.

US Navy Commander Kazimieras "Kaz" Zemeckis, holidaying in Israel at the time, accompanies Grief and his plane to the US Airforce's classified Area 51 at Groom Lake in Nevada. Grief is debriefed by Kaz and the CIA, and soon gains the trust of the Americans when he is happy to explain his MiG-25 to the base's pilots and technicians. Kaz, who is also an experienced test pilot, bonds with Grief and shows him the American's new F-15 fighter jet.

But Grief is not who he appears to be. It is revealed that he is a double agent secretly sent by elements within the KGB to infiltrate the American's decommissioned nuclear rocket program site at Jackass Flats in Nevada. One night, after setting fire to Area 51's fuel farm to create a distraction, he commandeers a stealth helicopter and flies to Jackass Flats to steal American nuclear rocket technology for the Soviets. He returns to Area 51 with his pickings, and amid the chaos at the base, takes off in his MiG-25 and heads for Mexico, where a Soviet Antonov An-22 transport is waiting to fly him and his plane back to Moscow. But Kaz, having realized Grief's deception, pursues him in the base's F-15. An aerial dogfight ensues, and Kaz manages to shoot down Grief's plane. Kaz is injured after crash-landing his damaged F-15, but Grief's body is never recovered from the MiG-25 crash site.

== Critical reception ==
In a review in Seven Circumstances, Martha Bijman wrote that The Defector shows that Hadfield is no "one-book-wonder phenomenon". She said he has "the right kind of imagination, experience and knowledge" to create exciting stories. The writing is clear and readable, and the technical descriptions are easy to follow. Bijman added that the book's numerous subplots leave clues to solving its mystery, and creates a "breathtaking climax" that is "exciting and very clever, and satisfying".

David Pitt described The Defector as "a gripping and intensely realistic fictional story". In a review in Booklist, Pitt called Hadfield "a gifted storyteller", and said his experiences as a test pilot adds to the novel's realism and accuracy. A reviewer in Kirkus Reviews found the book's technical detail and back histories, "interesting stuff", but complained that some of the events visited, for example the eve of the Yom Kippur War, and preparations for the Apollo–Soyuz space mission, were soon dropped and forgotten about. The reviewer felt that the "climactic showdown" between Kaz and Grief at the end was "rushed", and concluded that The Defector is a "well-[researched] but ultimately flat thriller".
