= Jeff Foust =

American journalist

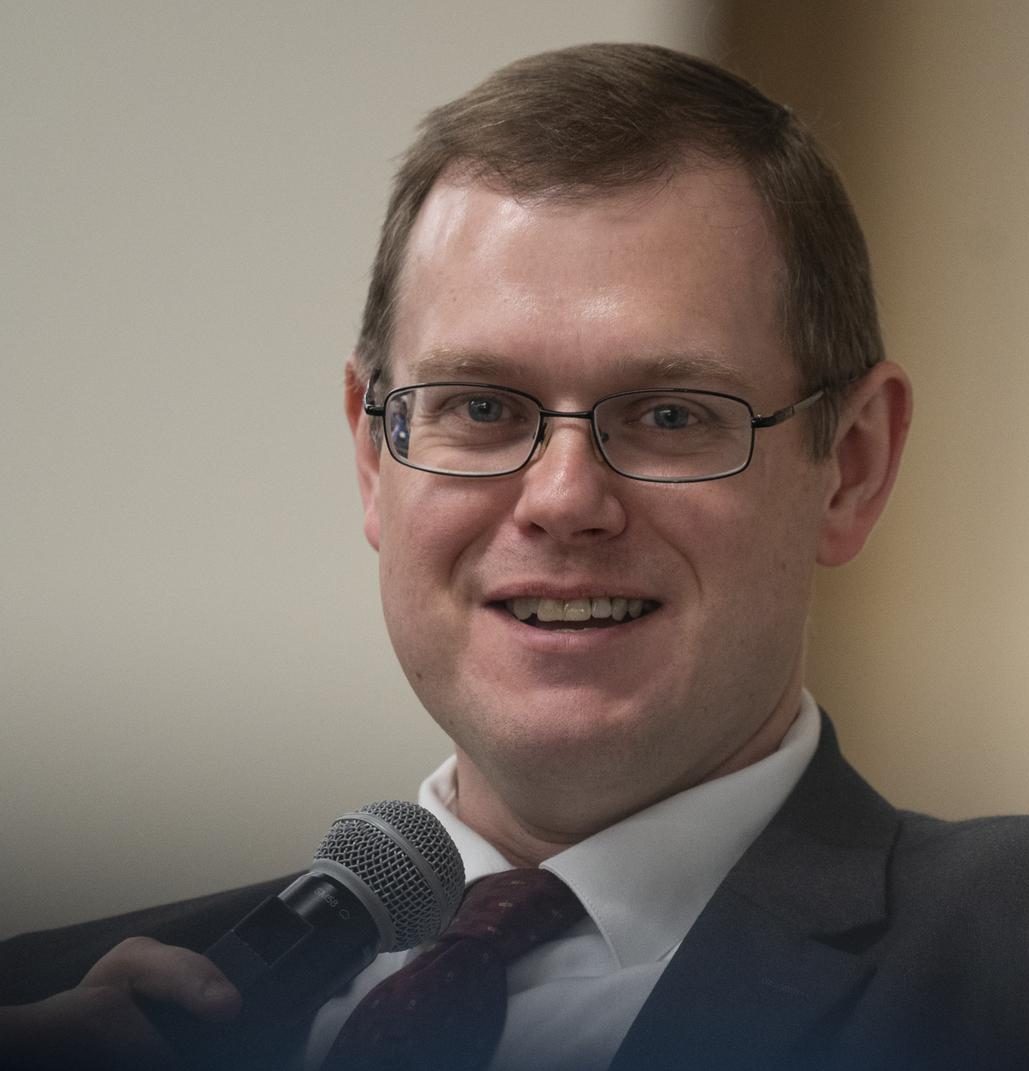
- Foust in 2019
- Education: California Institute of Technology (BS); Massachusetts Institute of Technology (PhD)
- Occupation: Journalist
- Years active: 2003–present
- Known for: SpaceNews, senior staff writer

Jeff Foust is an aerospace analyst, journalist and publisher. A senior aerospace analyst with the Futron Corporation in Bethesda, Maryland, he is the editor and publisher of The Space Review and has written for Astronomy Now and The New Atlantis. He was the writer of the blog Space Politics, which went on indefinite hiatus in 2014 when he accepted a position at SpaceNews.

He has a bachelor's degree in geophysics from the California Institute of Technology and a Ph.D in planetary sciences from the Massachusetts Institute of Technology.

== Publications ==
- with Ron LaFon: Astronomer's Computer Companion (with CD-ROM), 1999, No Starch Press, ISBN 1-886411-22-0
