= Chris Hadfield =

Canadian astronaut (born 1959)

Chris Hadfield OC OOnt MSC CD
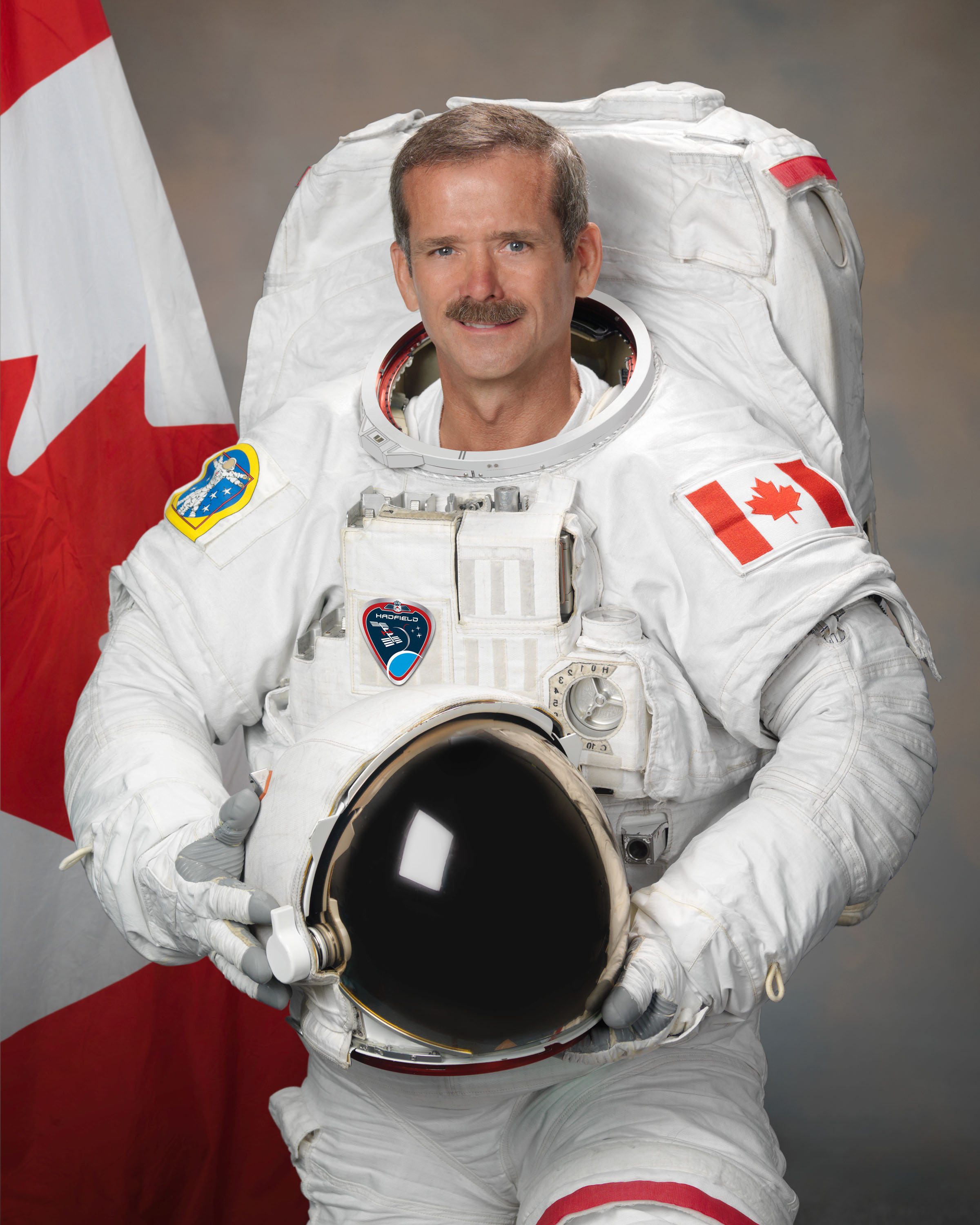
- Hadfield in July 2011
- Born: Chris Austin Hadfield; August 29, 1959 (age 67); Sarnia, Ontario, Canada
- Education: Royal Roads Military College; Royal Military College (BEng); University of Waterloo; University of Tennessee Space Institute (MSc)
- Spouse: Helene Walter (m. 1981)
- Children: 3
- Awards: Order of Canada (2014); Diamond Jubilee Medal (2012); NASA Exceptional Service Medal (2002); Golden Jubilee Medal (2002); Order of Ontario (1996); Liethen-Title Award (1988)
- Space career

CSA astronaut
- Time in space: 165 days, 16 hours, 18 minutes
- Selection: 1992 CSA Group; NASA Group 14 (1992)
- Total EVAs: 2
- Total EVA time: 14 hours, 50 minutes
- Missions: STS-74; STS-100; Soyuz TMA-07M (Expedition 34/35)
- Retired: July 3, 2013
- Military career
- Allegiance: Canada
- Branch: Air Command
- Service years: 1978–2003
- Rank: Colonel
- Website: chrishadfield.ca

Chris Austin Hadfield (born August 29, 1959) is a retired Royal Canadian Air Force colonel, test pilot, and CSA astronaut. As the first Canadian to perform extravehicular activity in outer space, he has flown two Space Shuttle missions and also served as commander of the International Space Station (ISS). Prior to his career as an astronaut, he served in the Canadian Armed Forces for 25 years as an Air Command fighter pilot.

Hadfield has cited part of his career inspiration to have come to him as a child, when he watched the first crewed Moon landing by American spaceflight Apollo 11 on television. He attended high school in Oakville and Milton in southern Ontario, and earned his glider pilot licence as a member of the Royal Canadian Air Cadets. After enlisting in the Canadian Armed Forces, he earned an engineering degree at the Royal Military College in Kingston, Ontario. Hadfield learned to fly various types of aircraft in the military and eventually became a test pilot, flying several experimental planes. As part of an exchange program with the United States Navy and United States Air Force, he obtained a master's degree in aviation systems at the University of Tennessee Space Institute.

In 1992, Hadfield was accepted into the Canadian astronaut program by the Canadian Space Agency. He first flew in space in November 1995 as a mission specialist aboard STS-74, visiting the Russian space station Mir. He flew again in April 2001 on STS-100, when he visited the ISS and walked in space to help install Canadarm2. In December 2012, he flew for a third time aboard Soyuz TMA-07M to join Expedition 34 on the ISS. When Expedition 34 ended in March 2013, Hadfield became the commander of the ISS as part of Expedition 35, responsible for a crew of five astronauts and helping to run dozens of scientific experiments dealing with the impact of low gravity on human biology. During this mission, he chronicled life onboard the space station by taking pictures of Earth and posting them on various social media platforms. He was a guest on television news and talk shows and gained popularity by playing the ISS's guitar in space. Hadfield returned to Earth in May 2013, when the mission ended. He announced his retirement shortly after returning, capping a 35-year-long career as a military pilot and astronaut. He has written five books, including his autobiography, An Astronaut's Guide to Life on Earth (2013), and a children's picture book, The Darkest Dark (2016).

== Early life and education ==
Chris Austin Hadfield was born on August 29, 1959, in Sarnia, Ontario, to Eleanor and Roger Hadfield, who lived in Milton, Ontario. He was raised on a corn farm in Southern Ontario. He was a member of a Wolf Cub Pack that met at the Milton Fairgrounds. He became interested in flying at a young age and in being an astronaut at age nine, when he saw the Apollo 11 Moon landing on television.

Hadfield attended White Oaks Secondary School in Oakville, Ontario, until his senior year and then graduated as an Ontario Scholar from Milton District High School in 1977. As a member of the Royal Canadian Air Cadets, he earned a glider pilot scholarship at age 15 and a powered pilot scholarship at age 16. After graduating from high school in 1978, he joined the Canadian Armed Forces and spent two years at Royal Roads Military College followed by two years at the Royal Military College of Canada, where he received a B.Eng. degree (with honours) in mechanical engineering in 1982. He also conducted his post-graduate research at the University of Waterloo in 1982.

== Military service ==
Before graduating from college, he underwent basic flight training at CFB Portage la Prairie. In 1983, he took honours as the top graduate from Basic Jet Training at CFB Moose Jaw, and then went on to train as a tactical fighter pilot with 410 Tactical Fighter Operational Training Squadron at CFB Cold Lake, flying the Canadair CF-116 Freedom Fighter and the McDonnell Douglas CF-18 Hornet. After completing his fighter training, Hadfield flew CF-18 Hornets with 425 Tactical Fighter Squadron, flying intercept missions for NORAD. He was the first CF-18 pilot to intercept a Soviet Tupolev Tu 95 long-range bomber in the Canadian Arctic.

In the late 1980s, Hadfield attended the US Air Force Test Pilot School at Edwards Air Force Base and was the Distinguished Graduate and winner of the Liethen-Tittle Award for the Outstanding Graduate in 1988. He later served as an exchange officer with the US Navy at Strike Test Directorate at the Patuxent River Naval Air Station. His accomplishments from 1989 to 1992 included testing the McDonnell Douglas F/A-18 Hornet and LTV A-7 Corsair II aircraft; performing research work with NASA on pitch control margin simulation and flight; completing the first military flight of F/A-18 enhanced performance engines; piloting the first flight test of the National Aerospace Plane external burning hydrogen propulsion engine; developing a new handling qualities rating scale for high angle-of-attack test; and participating in the F/A-18 out-of-control recovery test program.

In May 1992, Hadfield graduated with an M.Sc. degree in aviation systems from the University of Tennessee Space Institute, where his thesis concerned high-angle attack aerodynamics of the F/A-18 Hornet fighter jet. In total, Hadfield has flown over 70 different types of aircraft.

== Astronaut career ==
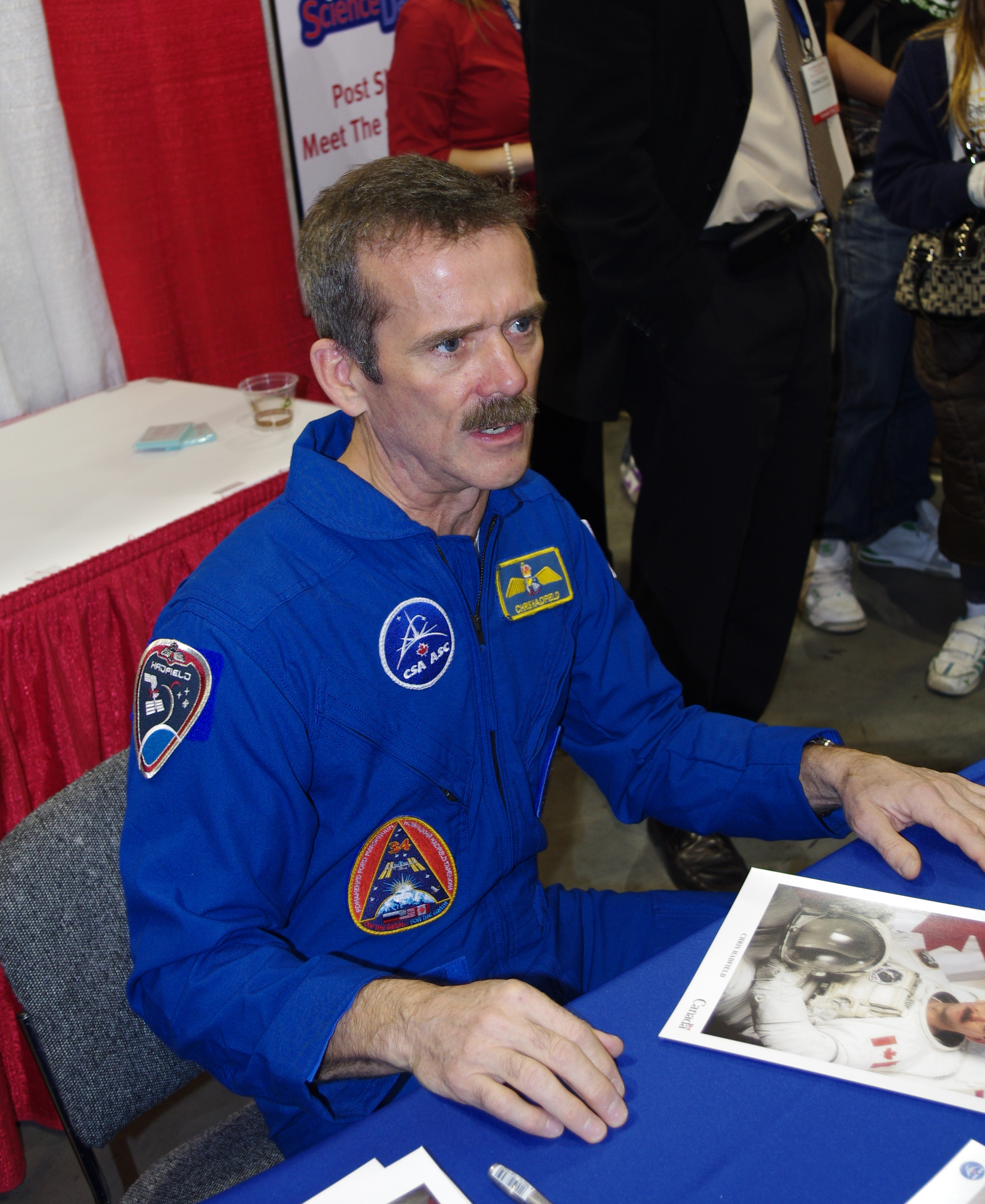
Chris Hadfield in 2012

Hadfield was selected to become one of four new Canadian astronauts from a field of 5,330 applicants in June 1992. Three of those four (Dafydd Williams, Julie Payette and Hadfield) have flown in space. The fourth candidate, Michael McKay, resigned as an astronaut in 1995. Hadfield was assigned by the CSA to the NASA Johnson Space Center in Houston, Texas in August, where he addressed technical and safety issues for Shuttle Operations Development, contributed to the development of the glass shuttle cockpit, and supported shuttle launches at the Kennedy Space Center, in Florida. In addition, Hadfield was NASA's chief CAPCOM (capsule communicator), the voice of mission control to astronauts in orbit, for 25 Space Shuttle missions. From 1996 to 2000, he represented CSA astronauts and coordinated their activities as the chief astronaut for the CSA.

He was the director of operations for NASA at the Yuri Gagarin Cosmonaut Training Center (GCTC) in Star City, Russia, from 2001 until 2003. Some of his duties included co-ordination and direction of all International Space Station crew activities in Russia, oversight of training and crew support staff, as well as policy negotiation with the Russian Space Program and other International Partners. He also trained and became fully qualified to be a flight engineer cosmonaut in the Soyuz TMA spacecraft, and to perform spacewalks in the Russian Orlan spacesuit.

Hadfield is a civilian CSA astronaut, having retired as a colonel from the Canadian Armed Forces in 2003 after 25 years of military service. He was chief of robotics for the NASA Astronaut Office at the Johnson Space Center in Houston, Texas from 2003 to 2006 and was chief of International Space Station Operations from 2006 to 2008. In 2008 and 2009, he trained as a back-up to Robert Thirsk on Expedition 21. In May 2010, Hadfield served as the commander of the NEEMO 14 mission aboard the Aquarius underwater laboratory, living and working underwater for fourteen days. NASA announced in 2010 that Hadfield would become the first Canadian commander of the International Space Station, leading Expedition 35 after its launch on December 19, 2012. His craft docked with the station on December 21. He remained on the station for five months, transferring control to Pavel Vinogradov and departing on May 13, 2013.

In June 2013, one month after completing his third trip to space, Hadfield announced his retirement from the Canadian Space Agency, effective July 3, 2013. Hadfield stated that after living primarily in the United States since the 1980s for his career, he would be moving back to Canada, "making good on a promise I made my wife nearly 30 years ago—that yes, eventually, we would be moving back to Canada." He noted that he plans to pursue private interests outside government there.

Hadfield is enthusiastic about the prospects for a crewed mission to Mars, and when asked in 2011 if he would consider being the first to visit even if the journey to Mars were one-way, he said "I would be honoured to be given the opportunity."

=== STS-74 ===
Hadfield served as mission specialist 1 on STS-74 in November 1995. It was NASA's second space shuttle mission to rendezvous and dock with the Russian Space Station Mir. During the flight, the crew of Space Shuttle Atlantis attached a five-tonne docking module to Mir and transferred over 1,000 kg of food, water, and scientific supplies to the cosmonauts. Hadfield flew as the first Canadian to operate the Canadarm in orbit, and the only Canadian ever to board Mir.

=== STS-100 ===
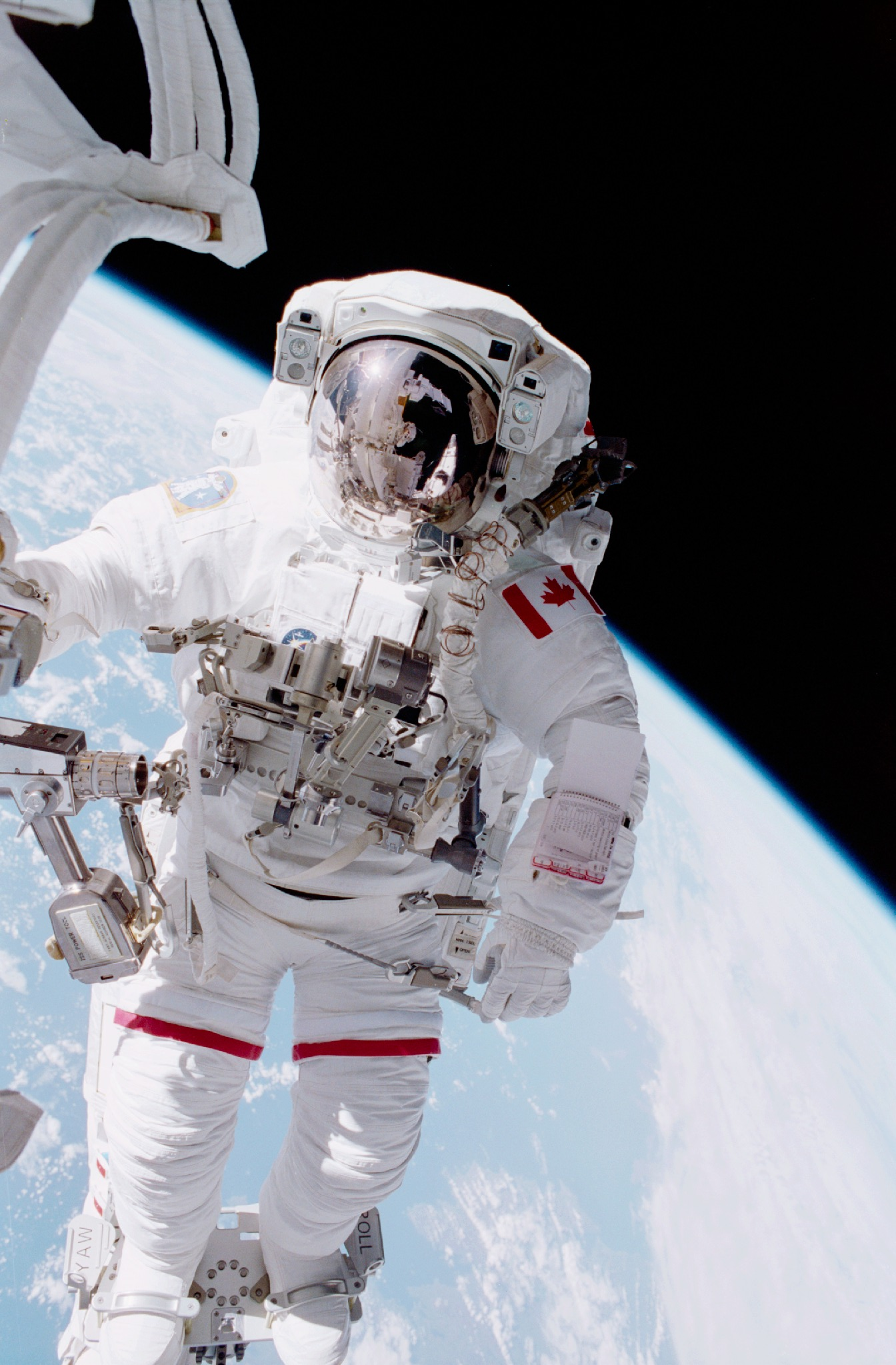
Hadfield spacewalking during the STS-100 mission

In April 2001, Hadfield served as mission specialist 1 on STS-100, International Space Station (ISS) assembly Flight 6A. The crew of Space Shuttle Endeavour delivered and installed Canadarm2, the new Canadian-built robotic arm, as well as the Italian-made resupply module Raffaello. During the 11-day flight, Hadfield performed two spacewalks, which made him the first Canadian to ever leave a spacecraft and float freely in space. During his first spacewalk Hadfield experienced severe eye irritation due to the anti-fog solution used to polish his spacesuit visor, temporarily blinding him and forcing him to vent oxygen into space. In total, Hadfield spent 14 hours, 50 minutes outside, travelling 10 times around the world during his spacewalk.

=== International Space Station ===
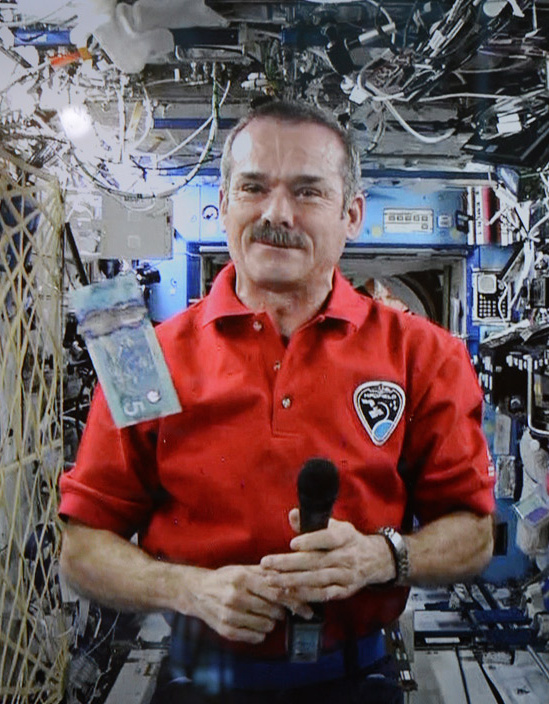
Hadfield answering media questions during unveiling of the Canadian $5 Frontier Series banknote during Expedition 35 on April 30, 2013. He unveiled the $10 banknote on the same day.

On December 19, 2012, Hadfield launched in the Soyuz TMA-07M flight for a long-duration stay on board the ISS as part of Expedition 35. He arrived at the station two days later, as scheduled, and became the first Canadian to command the ISS when the crew of Expedition 34 departed in March 2013. On May 12, 2013, he turned over command of the ISS, and returned home aboard the Soyuz spacecraft on May 13. He received significant media exposure during his time on the ISS, and ended his time on the station by paying tribute to David Bowie with a rendition of "Space Oddity".

== Social media ==
Hadfield has a social media presence, with over 2,400,000 Twitter followers as of August 2019. He created one of the top Reddit ask me anything (AMA) threads of all time on February 17, 2013. He also maintains accounts on Facebook, Tumblr, and YouTube. His exchanges with William Shatner and other Star Trek actors have received media coverage. Hadfield has been described by Forbes as "perhaps the most social media savvy astronaut ever to leave Earth".

Hadfield enlisted the help of his son Evan to manage his social media presence. They work in tandem to share information over the internet about aspects of life as an astronaut, both the scientific and the mundane.

== Music ==
During his free time on Expedition 35, Hadfield recorded music for an album, using the Larrivée Parlor guitar previously brought to the ISS. The first song recorded in space, "Jewel in the Night", was released via YouTube on Christmas Eve 2012.

His collaboration with Ed Robertson of Barenaked Ladies and the Wexford Gleeks, Is Somebody Singing?—sometimes shortened I.S.S.—was aired on the CBC Radio program Q and released by CBC Music online on February 8, 2013. Hadfield sang Is Somebody Singing along with singers across Canada for the national Music Monday program. Hadfield has been credited musically on his brother Dave Hadfield's albums. He also sang the "Canada Song" with his brother, released on YouTube on Canada Day, 2014.

On May 12, 2013, after handing over command of the ISS, but before returning home, Hadfield released a music video recorded on the ISS of a modified rendition of "Space Oddity" by David Bowie. As of May 2026, the video has over 56 million views on YouTube. The performance was the subject of a piece by Glenn Fleishman in The Economist on May 22, 2013, analysing the legal implications of publicly performing a copyrighted work of music while in Earth orbit.

In October 2015, Hadfield released Space Sessions: Songs From a Tin Can, an album of songs that he had recorded on the International Space Station.

== Post-retirement ==
In October 2013 Hadfield was interviewed by Maclean's magazine and appeared on its cover wearing face make-up to "replicate Bowie's famed image from the cover of his Aladdin Sane album." Hadfield wrote an article for the December 2013 edition of Wired magazine in which he reflects on his time spent on the International Space Station.

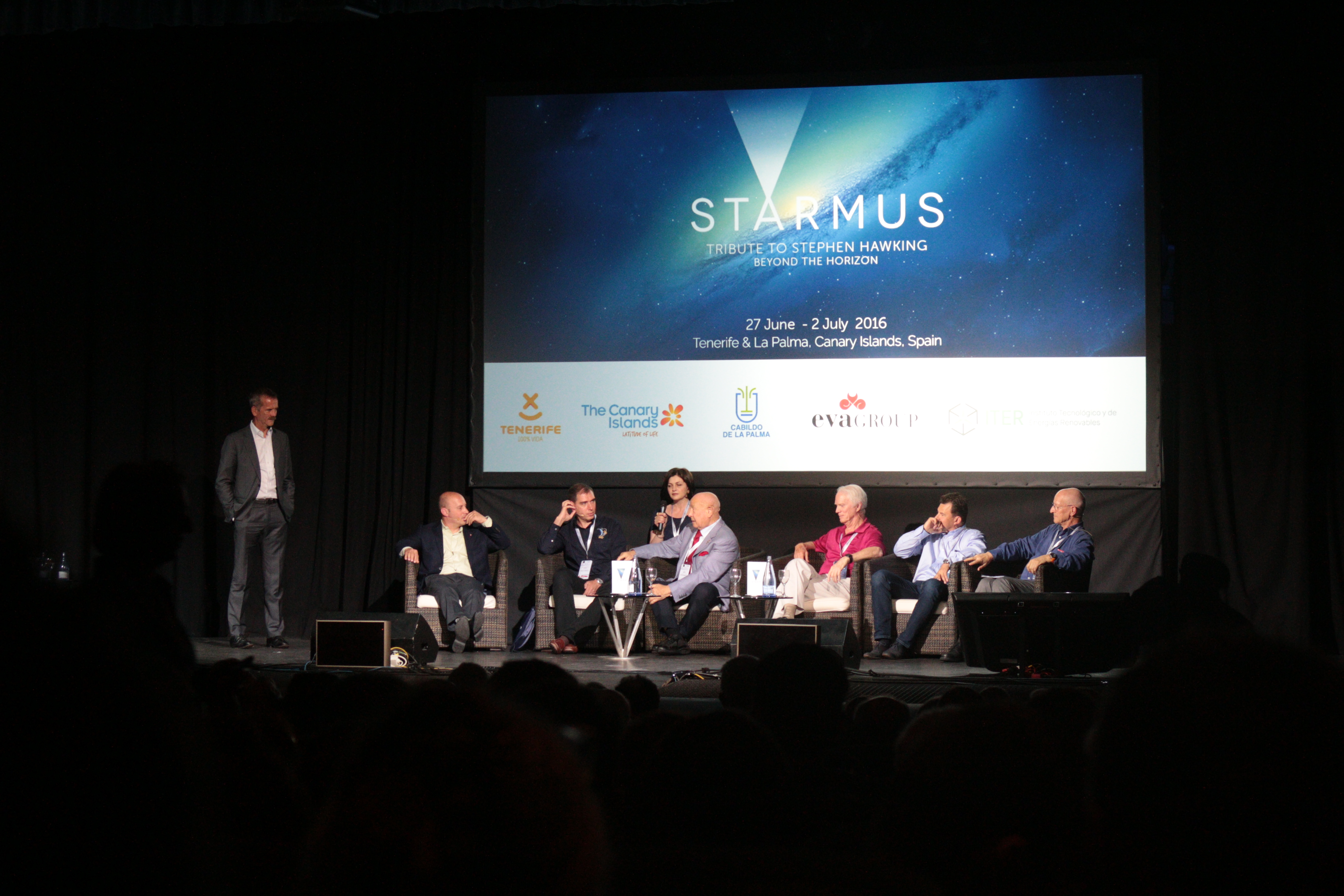
Hadfield with Rusty Schweickart, Alexei Leonov and Garrett Reisman at the Starmus Festival in 2016

On October 8, 2013, the University of Waterloo announced that Hadfield will join the university as a professor for a three-year term beginning in the Fall of 2014. Hadfield's work was expected to involve instructing and advising roles in aviation programs offered by the Faculty of Environment and Faculty of Science, as well as assisting in ongoing research regarding the health of astronauts with the Faculty of Applied Health Sciences.

In 2017, Hadfield hosted the BBC show Astronauts: Do You Have What It Takes? alongside Kevin Fong and Iya Whiteley, where 12 contestants compete to earn Hadfield's approval and recommendation as a candidate for future applications to become an astronaut. The challenges involved replicated real tests carried out by the different Space Agencies at facilities in Europe and America, including hypoxia and centrifuge training, with contestants eliminated each week.

Hadfield hosted a web series about space exploration on the video platform MasterClass.

On February 9, 2021, Virgin Galactic announced that Hadfield would be joining their Space Advisory Board to help "provide advice to senior management as the company moves forward to open space for the benefit of all." Hadfield will be joined by former astronaut Sandra Magnus and Chief Scientist of Cubic Corporation David A. Whelan.

=== Writing ===
Hadfield's 2013 autobiography, An Astronaut's Guide to Life on Earth: What Going to Space Taught Me About Ingenuity, Determination, and Being Prepared for Anything deals with his professional life and work, and with numerous examples from the lead-up to his command of Expedition 35. The book was a New York Times bestseller and was also the bestselling book in Canada on a Canadian subject.

In 2021, Hadfield released his debut novel The Apollo Murders, a thriller set in the Cold War. Sequels entitled The Defector and Final Orbit were released in 2023 and 2025 respectively. Hadfield stated in October 2025 that he has drafted an outline for a fourth book in the Apollo Murders series.

== Special honours and affiliations ==
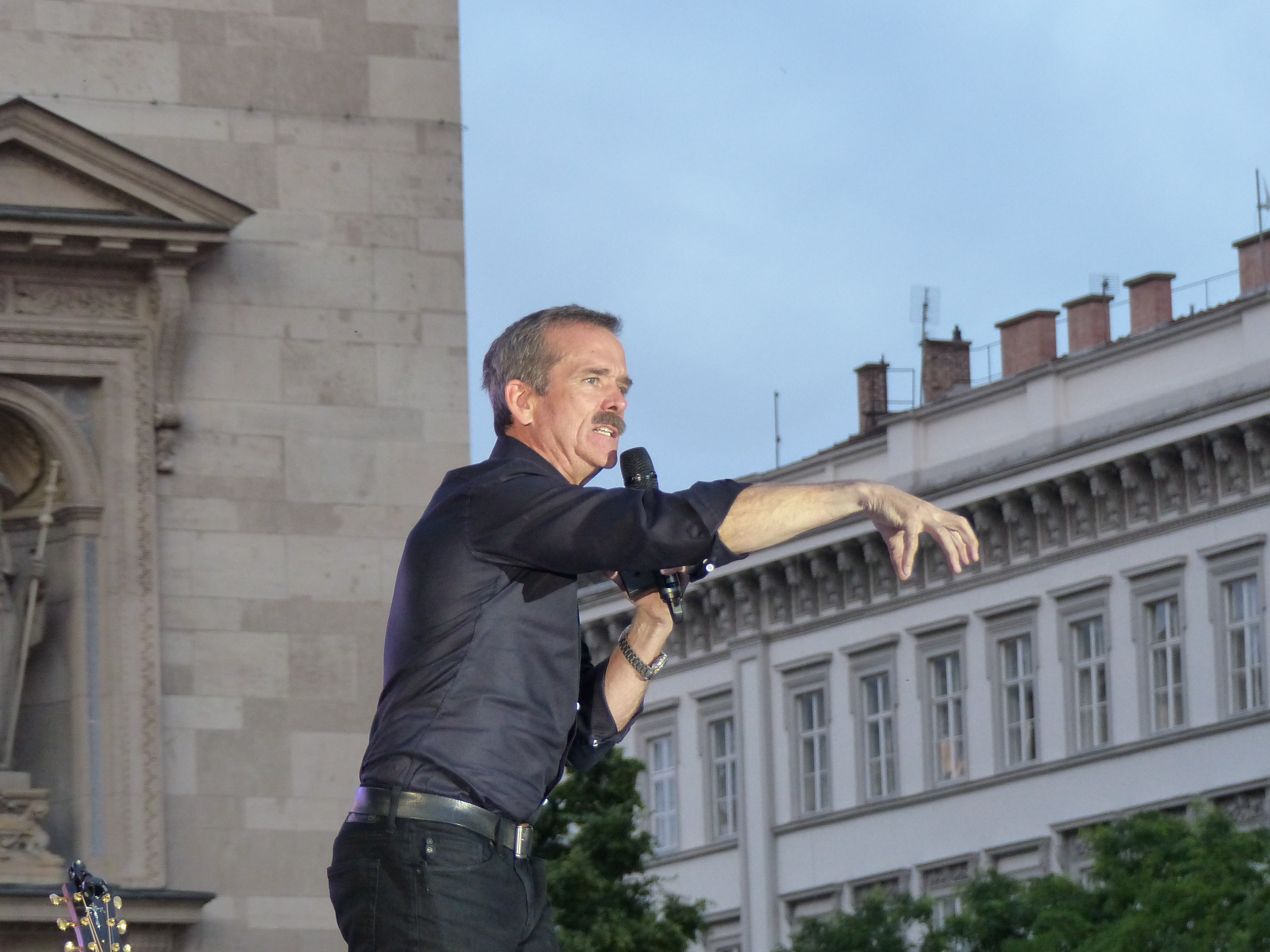
Hadfield at Brain Bar Budapest, 2016

Hadfield is the recipient of numerous awards and special honours. These include appointment to the Order of Ontario in 1996, as an Officer of the Order of Canada in 2014, receipt of the Vanier Award in 2001, NASA Exceptional Service Medal in 2002, the Queen's Golden Jubilee Medal in 2002, and the Queen's Diamond Jubilee Medal in 2012. He is also the only Canadian to have received both a military and civilian Meritorious Service Cross, the military medal in 2001 and the civilian one in 2013.

In 1988, Hadfield was granted the Liethen-Tittle Award (top pilot graduate of the USAF Test Pilot School) and was named US Navy Test Pilot of the Year in 1991. He was inducted into Canada's Aviation Hall of Fame in 2005. Eleven years later, he was recognized as a Genius 100 Visionary and contributed his vision of the future in the 3D publishing milestone '"Genius: 100 Visions of the Future."' Further, the Royal Military College granted Hadfield an honorary Doctorate of Engineering in 1996 and he was presented with an honorary Doctorate of Laws from Trent University three years later. In 2013, Hadfield was presented with an Honorary Diploma from Nova Scotia Community College.

Hadfield was commemorated on Royal Canadian Mint silver and gold coins for his spacewalk to install Canadarm2 on the International Space Station in 2001. In Sarnia, the city airport was renamed to Sarnia Chris Hadfield Airport in 1997 and there are two public schools named after him – one in Milton, Ontario, and the other in Bradford, Ontario. The asteroid 14143 Hadfield is also named after him. In 2005, the Royal Canadian Air Cadets 820 Milton Blue Thunder Squadron was renamed as the 820 Chris Hadfield Squadron in honour of Hadfield, who was a cadet there from 1971 to 1978. The Town of Milton also named a municipal park and street after Hadfield. His name was in 2014 added to the Wall of Honour at the Royal Military College of Canada in Kingston, Ontario, and, in 2020, the newly discovered Andrena hadfieldi, a species of bee, was named in his honour.

His affiliations include membership in the Royal Military College Club, Society of Experimental Test Pilots, Canadian Aeronautics and Space Institute, and serving as honorary patron of Lambton College, former trustee of Lakefield College School, board member of the International Space School Foundation, and executive with the Association of Space Explorers.

Upon his taking command of the International Space Station, Elizabeth II, Queen of Canada, sent Hadfield a personal message of congratulations, stating "I am pleased to transmit my personal best wishes, and those of all Canadians, to Colonel Christopher Hadfield as he takes command of the International Space Station". Elizabeth's successor, Charles III, held an audience with Hadfield at Buckingham Palace on February 9, 2023, to discuss sustainability in space.

== Bibliography ==
=== Books ===
- Hadfield, Chris (2013). An Astronaut's Guide to Life on Earth: What Going to Space Taught Me About Ingenuity, Determination, and Being Prepared for Anything. New York: Little, Brown and Company. ISBN 978-0-316-25301-7.
- Hadfield, Chris (2014). You Are Here: Around the World in 92 Minutes: Photographs from the International Space Station. New York: Little, Brown and Company. ISBN 978-0-316-37964-9.
- Hadfield, Chris (2016). The Darkest Dark. Illustrated by Terry and Eric Fan, contributions by Kate Fillion. New York: Little, Brown and Company. ISBN 978-0-316-39472-7.

The Apollo Murders series

- Hadfield, Chris (2021). The Apollo Murders. New York: Little, Brown and Company. ISBN 978-0-316-26473-0.
- Hadfield, Chris (2023). The Defector. New York: Little, Brown and Company. ISBN 978-0-316-56502-8.
- Hadfield, Chris (2025). Final Orbit. New York: Little, Brown and Company. ISBN 978-0-316-58170-7.

=== Essays and reporting ===
- Hadfield, Chris (November 2013). "We Should Treat Earth as Kindly as We Treat Spacecraft". Wired. Vol. 21, no. 12.

== Discography ==
=== Albums ===
| Title | Album details | Peak chart positions | Certifications |
| Title | Album details | CAN | Certifications |
|---|---|---|---|
| Space Sessions: Songs From A Tin Can | Released: October 31, 2015; Label: Warner Music; Formats: CD, DD, LP | 10 | |

=== Guest appearances ===
| Title | Year | Other artist(s) | Album |
|---|---|---|---|
| "So Easy" | 2014 | Emm Gryner | Torrential |
| "Re-Entry" | 2021 | TWRP | New & Improved |

Hadfield also participates as a vocalist and guitarist for the astronaut band Max Q.

== Personal life ==
On December 23, 1981, in Waterloo, Ontario, Hadfield married his high-school girlfriend Helene Hadfield (née Walter), with whom he has three children: Kyle, Evan, and Kristin Hadfield. Hadfield used to be a ski instructor at Glen Eden Ski Area before becoming a test pilot.

Hadfield is of northern English and southern Scottish descent. He is a devoted fan of the Toronto Maple Leafs, and wore a Leafs jersey under his spacesuit during his Soyuz TMA-07M re-entry in May 2013. After the 2012–13 NHL lock-out ended, Hadfield tweeted a photo of himself holding a Maple Leafs logo, and stated he was "ready to cheer [his team] on from orbit". He sang the Canadian National Anthem during the Toronto Maple Leafs and Montreal Canadiens game on January 18, 2014, at the Air Canada Centre in Toronto, Ontario. In November 2022, he was invited by coach John Herdman to speak to the Canada soccer team ahead of their first match in the FIFA World Cup in Qatar.

== See also ==
- List of University of Waterloo people

| Preceded by Kevin Ford | ISS Expedition Commander; March 13 to May 13, 2013 | Succeeded by Pavel Vinogradov |
