= An Astronaut's Guide to Life on Earth =

2013 autobiography by Chris Hadfield

- First edition cover
- Author: Chris Hadfield
- Language: English
- Subject: Human spaceflight
- Genre: Autobiography
- Publisher: Little, Brown and Company
- Publication date: October 29, 2013
- Publication place: Canada
- Media type: Hardback
- Pages: 304
- Award: Libris Award
- ISBN: 978-0-316-25301-7

An Astronaut's Guide to Life on Earth: What Going to Space Taught Me About Ingenuity, Determination, and Being Prepared for Anything is a 2013 autobiography by Canadian retired astronaut and writer Chris Hadfield. (Note: The cover of the United States edition of the book refers to Hadfield as Col. Chris Hadfield.) It is Hadfield's debut book and was first published in October 2013 in the United States by Little, Brown and Company, and in the United Kingdom by Pan Macmillan. Hadfield has since written two more non-fiction books, and three novels.

An Astronaut's Guide to Life on Earth won the 2014 CBA Libris Non-Fiction Book of the Year Award, and was a New York Times bestseller in December 2013.

== Background ==
Hadfield became a NASA astronaut in the early 1990s, and went on to become the first Canadian to perform a spacewalk in 2001 and command the International Space Station (ISS) in 2003. A good communicator, Hadfield garnered a following of nearly a million Twitter users when he posted images of Earth from the ISS and documented his experiences in space. In an interview with BBC News, Hadfield said, "Space was too good not to share it".

Hadfield told Space.com that he considered writing this book around 2003, and made some notes of what he could include, but it was not until 2011 that be began working on it. Hadfield said he never intended for it to be an autobiography, but rather a rundown of some of the talks he had presented over the previous twenty one years. When An Astronaut's Guide to Life on Earth was published on October 29, 2013, Hadfield began a three-month book tour in Canada, the United States, the United Kingdom and Ireland to promote the release of his memoir.

== Synopsis ==
In An Astronaut's Guide to Life on Earth, Hadfield recounts how, when he was a nine-year-old boy living on a farm in rural Canada, he watched the Apollo 11 Moon landing and decided he wanted to be an astronaut. While in high school, Hadfield joined the Royal Canadian Air Cadets and obtained his pilot's license at the age of 16. After school he went to military college and trained to become a Canadian fighter pilot. He entered the U.S. Air Force Test Pilot School at Edwards Air Force Base in 1987 and graduated to a test pilot in 1988. In 1992, Hadfield became an astronaut for the Canadian Space Agency, and joined NASA at their Johnson Space Center in Houston, Texas in the same year.

Hadfield's first space flight was aboard the Space Shuttle Atlantis in 1995, which docked with the Russian Space Station Mir. His first spacewalk was in 2001 when he flew to the International Space Station (ISS) aboard the Space Shuttle Endeavour to install the ISS Canadarm2 robotic arm. In 2012 and 2013 Hadfield spent almost five months aboard the ISS, and became the space station's commander during the latter months. It was during this period that Hadfield used social media to share his experiences in space with hundreds of thousands of follows on Earth.

In the autobiography Hadfield describes the daily activities in space, including exercising, eating, washing and visiting the bathroom. Work-related activities include space station maintenance, performing scheduled experiments, making observations, and attending to unscheduled problems that crop up from time to time. Hadfield emphasises the importance of attention to detail, and states, "every astronaut is essentially a perpetual student", and later, "our passion isn't for thrills but for the grindstone, and pressing our nose to it."

== Critical reception ==
Kirkus Reviews described An Astronaut's Guide to Life on Earth as a "page-turning memoir of life as a decorated astronaut". The reviewer stated that Hadfield's descriptions of his time in space are "lively", and called his "behind-the-scenes" glimpses of what means to be an astronaut, "satisfying" and "a useful corrective to the popular celebrity image."

A reviewer in The New York Times called the memoir "part fascinating ... part Boy Scout manual." They said while Hadfield's charm on Twitter surfaces from time to time in the book, he stresses how important it is to be "focused less on the magical than the mundane". The reviewer commented that considering how "naturally thrilling" the book's subject is, "Mr. Hadfield makes an overly earnest tour guide".

Writing in Nature, John Gilbey was "impress[ed]" by Hadfield's memoir and recommended it to secondary school students for "inspiration, motivation and a sense of belief in the future of humanity in space". Gilbey said this book deserves a place alongside those written by the Apollo 11 astronauts, and added, "I can think of no higher praise".

In a review in The Wall Street Journal, Adam Savage, co-producer and co-host of MythBusters, found the book "fascinating" and "more enjoyable than I expected". He said it is both "autobiographical and instructional", and differs from "most 'success' books" in the way it highlights the importance of dwelling on trivial detail and what can go wrong in space flight. Savage noted that the book is "a very human glimpse into a rarefied world", and concluded:

"The vacuum of space is unforgiving and brutal. Life on earth isn't easy, either. Mr. Hadfield has genuinely and refreshingly increased our understanding of how to thrive in both places."

== TV adaptation ==
Deadline announced in August 2014 that ABC, in association with Warner Bros. TV and 3 Arts Entertainment, has acquired the rights to a TV adaptation of Hadfield's book, An Astronaut's Guide to Life on Earth. Deadline stated that the script will be written by Justin Halpern and Patrick Schumacker, who will also executive produce with Erwin Stoff and Tom Lassally from 3 Arts. Hadfield will be the consulting producer. Deadline described the TV show as "a family comedy about an astronaut who is back from space and finds that re-entering domestic life might be the hardest mission he’s ever faced."

Hadfield said in an interview in October 2014 that Warner Brothers contacted him soon after his memoir was published in 2013 about a possible adaptation. Hadfield and his wife met with Warner Brother and several US TV networks, and ABC elected to undertake the production. Hadfield said he began working with the writers to create a pilot, but added that he did not know who will be in the cast.

As of April 2026 no further announcements have been made regarding the development or release of this TV series.

== Bibliography ==
- Hadfield, Chris (2013). An Astronaut's Guide to Life on Earth. Little, Brown and Company. ISBN 978-0-316-25301-7.
