= The Space Review =

American online magazine

- Website type: Online magazine
- Available in: English
- Creator: Jeff Foust
- Website: www.thespacereview.com
- Commercial: Yes
- Launched: February 2003; 23 years ago

The Space Review is a free online publication, published weekly with in-depth articles, essays, commentary and reviews on space exploration and development. It was founded in February 2003 by Jeff Foust, the current editor, publisher and regular writer.

Other regular writers include:

- John K. Strickland, National Space Society, Board of Directors
- Brian Weeden
- Dwayne A. Day
- Taylor Dinerman (deceased 2021)
- Sam Dinkin
- Anthony Young

The publication is known for its coverage of space tourism, as well as NASA and the satellite launch industry.
