= David A. Whelan =

American scientist and engineer

- Education: UCSD (BA); UCLA (MS) (PhD)
- Occupations: Senior Vice President and Chief Scientist
- Employer: Cubic Corporation

David A. Whelan is an American scientist and engineer. He currently serves as the Senior Vice President and Chief Scientist of Cubic Corporation. He is also a member of Virgin Galactic's Space Advisory Board. He is a Professor of the Practice, Electrical and Computer Engineering at the University of California, San Diego Jacobs School of Engineering.

== Education ==
Whelan received his Bachelors of Arts in Physics from UC San Diego in 1978. He went on to complete his Masters of Science in 1977 and Ph.D in 1983 from UCLA.

== Career ==
Whelan started his career at Northrop where he was one of the key designers of the B-2 Stealth Bomber and contributed to the YF-23 Advanced Tactical Fighter. Since his time at Northrop, he has moved on to positions at other organizations such as the Hughes Aircraft Company, Lawrence Livermore National Laboratory (LLNL), and DARPA. At Hughes, he assumed the role of Program Manager and Chief Scientist working on the B-2's air-to-air radar imaging. At the LLNL, he worked on X-ray lasers and the Advanced Nuclear Weapons program. While at DARPA, he took on the role of the director for the Tactical Technology Office (TTO) and also the acting director for the Sensor Technology Office (STO). He went on to serve as the vice president of engineering and chief technologist for Boeing. He left Boeing in January 2017. At this time became the Chairman Of The Board at AOSense, a position which he still holds. In October 2020, it was announced that Whelan would be joining Cubic as the Senior Vice President and Chief Scientist.

== Memberships ==
Whelan was elected to the National Academy of Engineering in 2007. He was elected for his "contributions to and leadership of the field of radar imaging and its application to stealth aircraft." He is a fellow of the American Physical Society, fellow of the AIAA and fellow of the IEEE.
