= Expedition 1 =

2000s expedition to the ISS

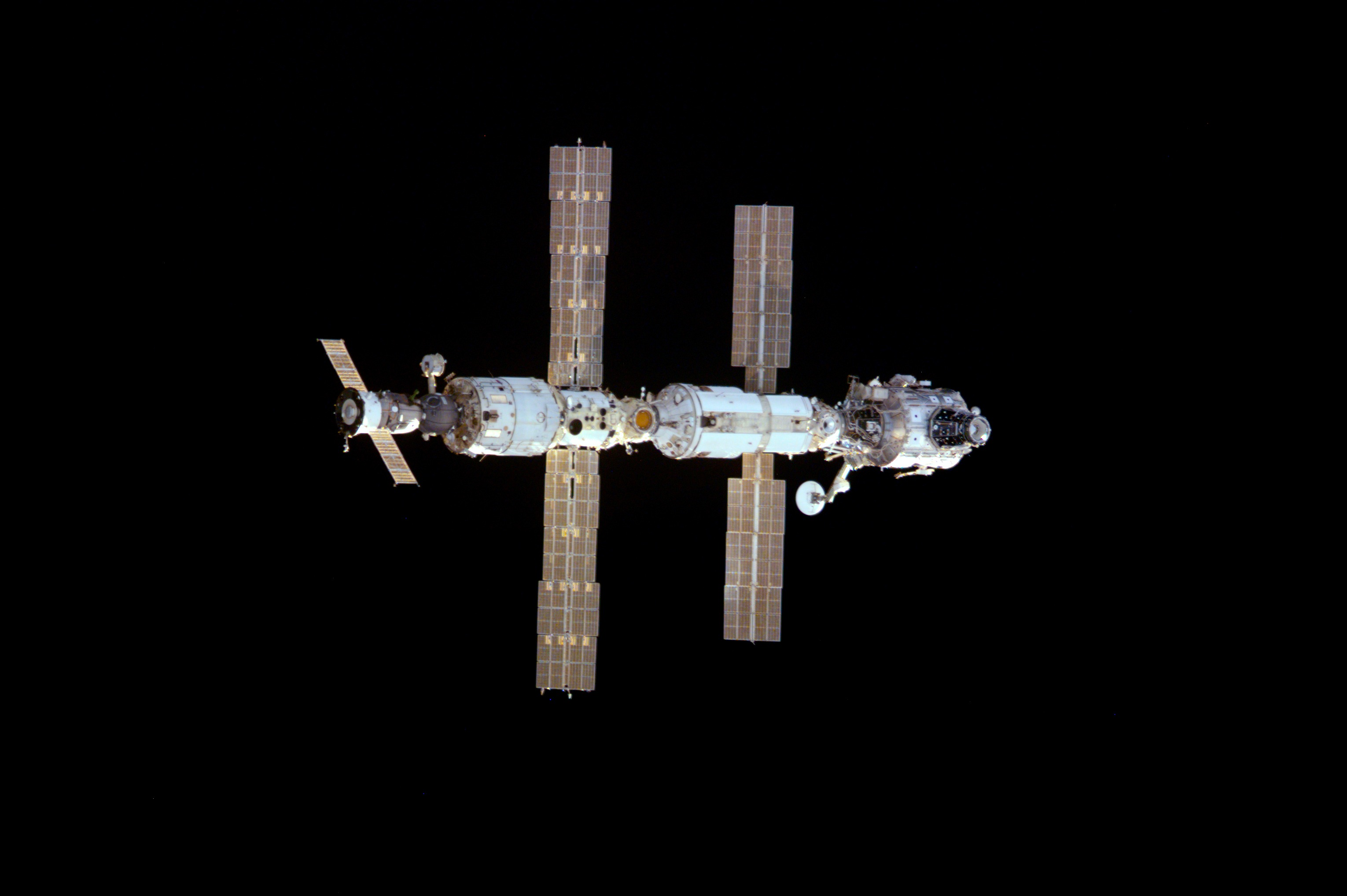
- The ISS during Expedition 1, seen during the approach of STS-97, the first Shuttle mission to visit the inhabited space station
- Mission type: Long-duration expedition
- Mission duration: 136 days, 14 hours, 7 minutes (at ISS) 140 days, 23 hours, 39 minutes (launch to landing)

Expedition
- Space station: International Space Station
- Began: 2 November 2000, 10:23 UTC
- Ended: 19 March 2001, 00:30 UTC
- Arrived aboard: Soyuz TM-31
- Departed aboard: STS-102

Crew
- Crew size: 3
- Members: William Shepherd; Yuri Gidzenko; Sergei Krikalev
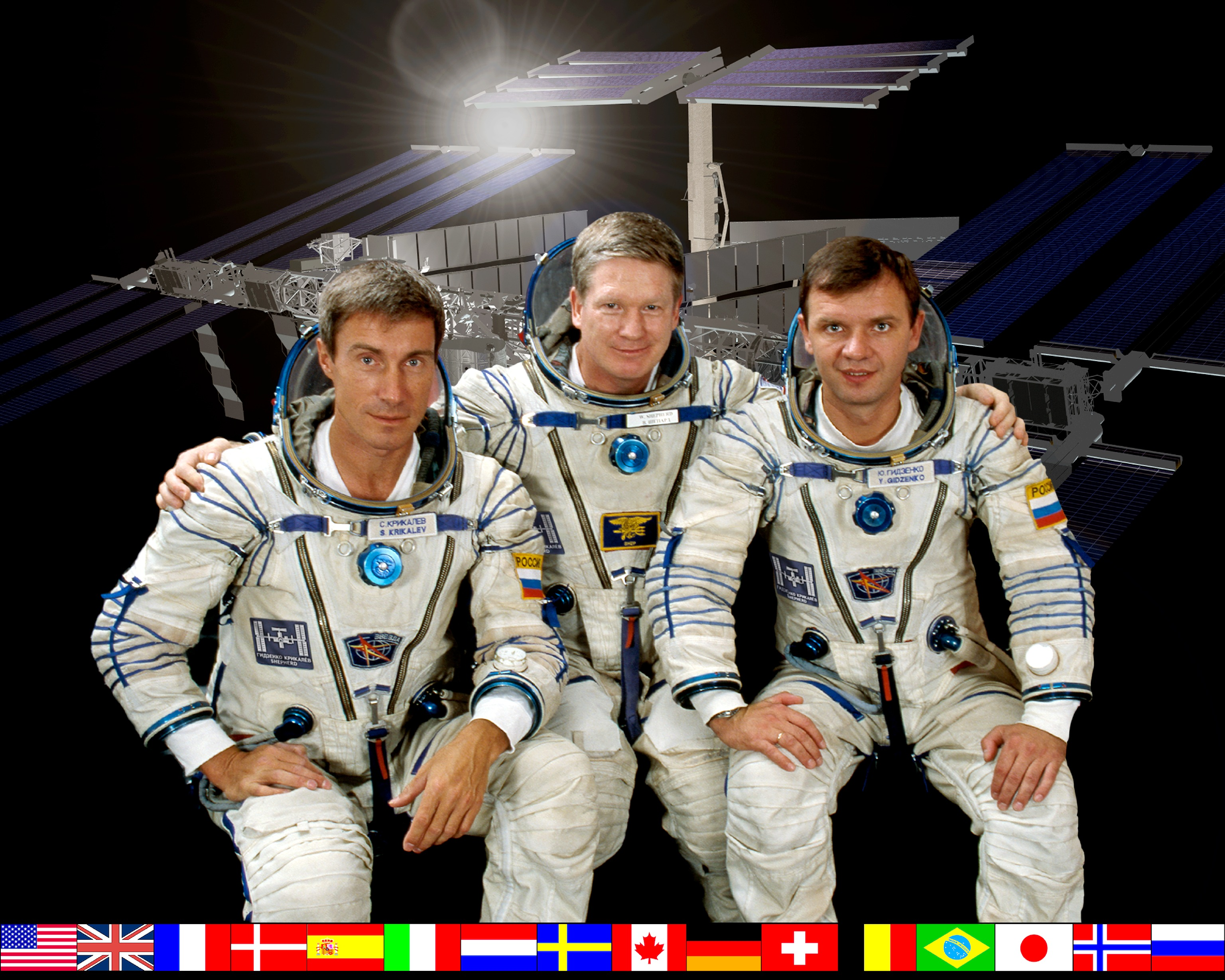
- Mission patch From left: Krikalev, Shepherd and Gidzenko ISS expeditions

Expedition 1 was the first long-duration expedition to the International Space Station (ISS). The three-person crew stayed aboard the station for 136 days, from 2 November 2000 to 19 March 2001. It was the beginning of an uninterrupted human presence on the station which continues as of 2026.

The official start of the expedition occurred when the crew docked to the station on 2 November 2000, aboard the Russian spacecraft Soyuz TM-31, which had launched on 31 October 2000 at the Baikonur Cosmodrome in Kazakhstan. During their mission, the Expedition 1 crew activated various systems on board the station, unpacked equipment that had been delivered, and hosted three visiting Space Shuttle crews and two uncrewed Russian Progress resupply vehicles. The crew was very busy throughout the mission, which was declared a success.

The three visiting Space Shuttles brought equipment, supplies, and key components of the space station. The first of these, STS-97, docked in early December 2000, and brought the first pair of large U.S. photovoltaic arrays, which increased the station's power capabilities fivefold. The second visiting shuttle mission was STS-98, which was docked in mid-February 2001 and delivered the US$1.4 billion research module Destiny, which increased the mass of the station beyond that of Mir for the first time. Mid-March 2001 saw the final shuttle visit of the expedition, STS-102, whose main purpose was to exchange the Expedition 1 crew with the next three-person long-duration crew, Expedition 2. The expedition ended when Discovery undocked from the station on 18 March 2001.

The Expedition 1 crew consisted of an American commander and two Russians. The commander, Bill Shepherd, had been in space three times before, all on shuttle missions which lasted at most a week. The Russians, Yuri Gidzenko and Sergei K. Krikalev, both had previous long-duration spaceflights on Mir, with Krikalev having spent over a year in space.

== Crew ==
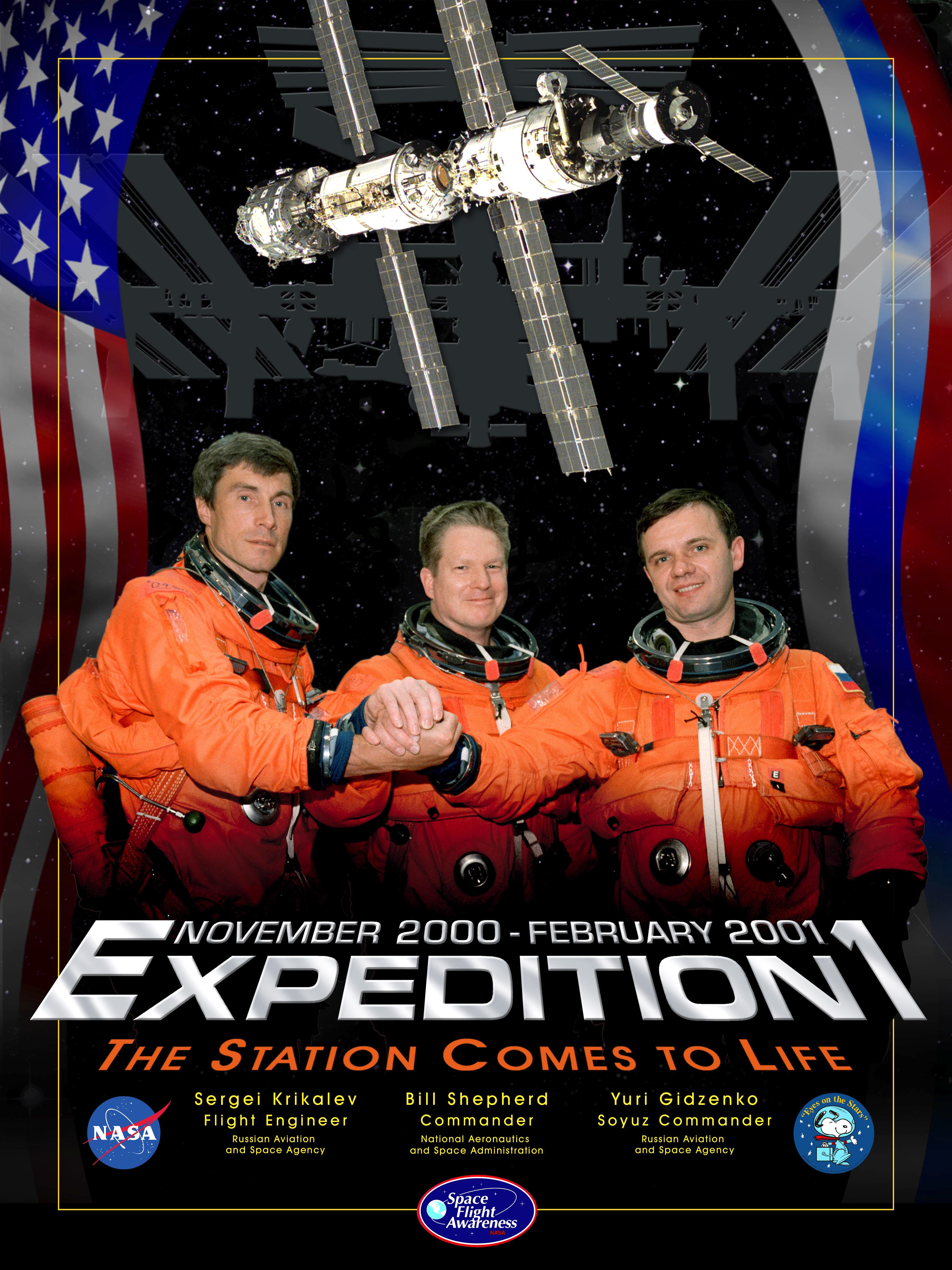
Expedition 1 promotional poster

The commander, Bill Shepherd, was a former Navy SEAL, whose only spaceflights were on shuttle missions, and at the beginning of the mission his total time in space was about two weeks. Questions had been raised by the Russian space agency about the choice of Shepherd as mission commander due to his lack of experience. Flight engineer Sergei Krikalev had spent over a year in orbit, mostly on Mir, and would become the first person to visit the ISS twice. He had felt excitement to have been one of the first people to enter the Zarya module (the first component of the space station) in 1998, during STS-88, and was looking forward to returning. Yuri Gidzenko was designated commander and pilot of the two-day Soyuz mission to the station, had one previous spaceflight, which was a 180-day stay aboard Mir.

Shepherd was only the second U.S. astronaut to be launched in a Russian spacecraft, the first being Norman Thagard, who launched on Soyuz TM-21 to visit Mir in 1995. Shepherd expected one of the biggest challenges for the ISS would be the compatibility of technologies between Russian and U.S.

Prime crew
Position	Crew
Commander	William Shepherd, NASA; Fourth and last spaceflight
Flight Engineer	Yuri Gidzenko, RSA; Second spaceflight
Flight Engineer	Sergei Krikalev, RSA; Fifth spaceflight

Backup crew
Position	Crew
Commander	Kenneth Bowersox, NASA
Flight Engineer	Vladimir Dezhurov, RSA
Flight Engineer	Mikhail Tyurin, RSA

== Background ==
The first component of the International Space Station was the Zarya module, which was launched uncrewed on 20 November 1998. Between this launch and the arrival of the first crew, five crewed Space Shuttle missions from the U.S. and two uncrewed Russian flights expanded the station and prepared it for human habitation.

Four of the five Shuttle flights focused primarily on delivering and unpacking substantial cargo for future crews. STS-88 launched on 4 December 1998, delivered the Unity module, the first component of the US Orbital Segment (USOS) during the mission, the crew spent several hours unpacking and setting up both Unity and Zarya. Krikalev, who would be a Flight Engineer on Expedition 1 flew on STS-88 and together with Shuttle Commander Robert D. Cabana became the first two people to jointly enter Unity and later Zarya.

STS-96, in May 1999, delivered 1,618 kilograms (3,567 lb) of pressurized cargo, 320 liters (84 U.S. gal) of water, and 300 kilograms (662 lb) of unpressurized cargo that was attached during a nearly eight hour EVA. Space Shuttle Atlantis visited the station during the STS-101 mission in May 2000. It delivered another 1,500 kilograms (3,300 lb) of pressurized cargo, and performed station maintenance. Near the end of the mission, they used Atlantis's thrusters to boost the ISS by 42 kilometres (26 mi) into a 380 kilometres (236 mi) orbit. Three of STS-101’s crew members — Yury V. Usachev, James S. Voss and Susan J. Helms — would visit the station the following year as the crew of Expedition 2.

The Zvezda module, the crew's living quarters, launched on 12 July 2000 and autonomously docked on the 26th. It was followed by the unmanned Progress M1-3 cargo spacecraft which docked on 8 August. STS-106, in September 2000, connected Zvezda to Zarya, delivered 2,700 kilograms (6,000 lb) of cargo including 140 kilograms (300 lb) of water, a vacuum cleaner, office supplies, and all of the food for the Expedition 1 crew. In total, the crew spent nearly five and a half days inside the station unloading both the Shuttle and the Progress and setting everything up for the Expedition 1 crew.

While not necessary to the mission of Expedition 1, the Space Shuttle did conduct one additional flight before the crew's arrival, STS-92 in October 2000, which delivered and installed the first piece of the Integrated Truss Structure along with an additional Pressurized Mating Adapter. This mission would enable future expansion of the USOS.

Prior to Expedition 1, Krikalev expected the ISS to be very similar to his experience on Mir ten years previous, due to the physical similarities of the stations' components.

The launch of the Expedition 1 crew occurred a week before the United States presidential election, so it got little attention in the United States. At the time of the mission, the station was expected to be completed in 2006, and be continuously inhabited until at least 2015. Due to several delays, including the fallout from the Space Shuttle Columbia disaster, the station was not completed until 2021, with the arrival of the Nauka laboratory.

== Mission highlights ==
The crew of three were on board the International Space Station for four and a half months, from early November 2000 to mid-March 2001. Major events during this time include the three-week-long Space Shuttle visits, which occurred in early December, mid-February, and at the end of the expedition in March.

=== Launch and docking ===
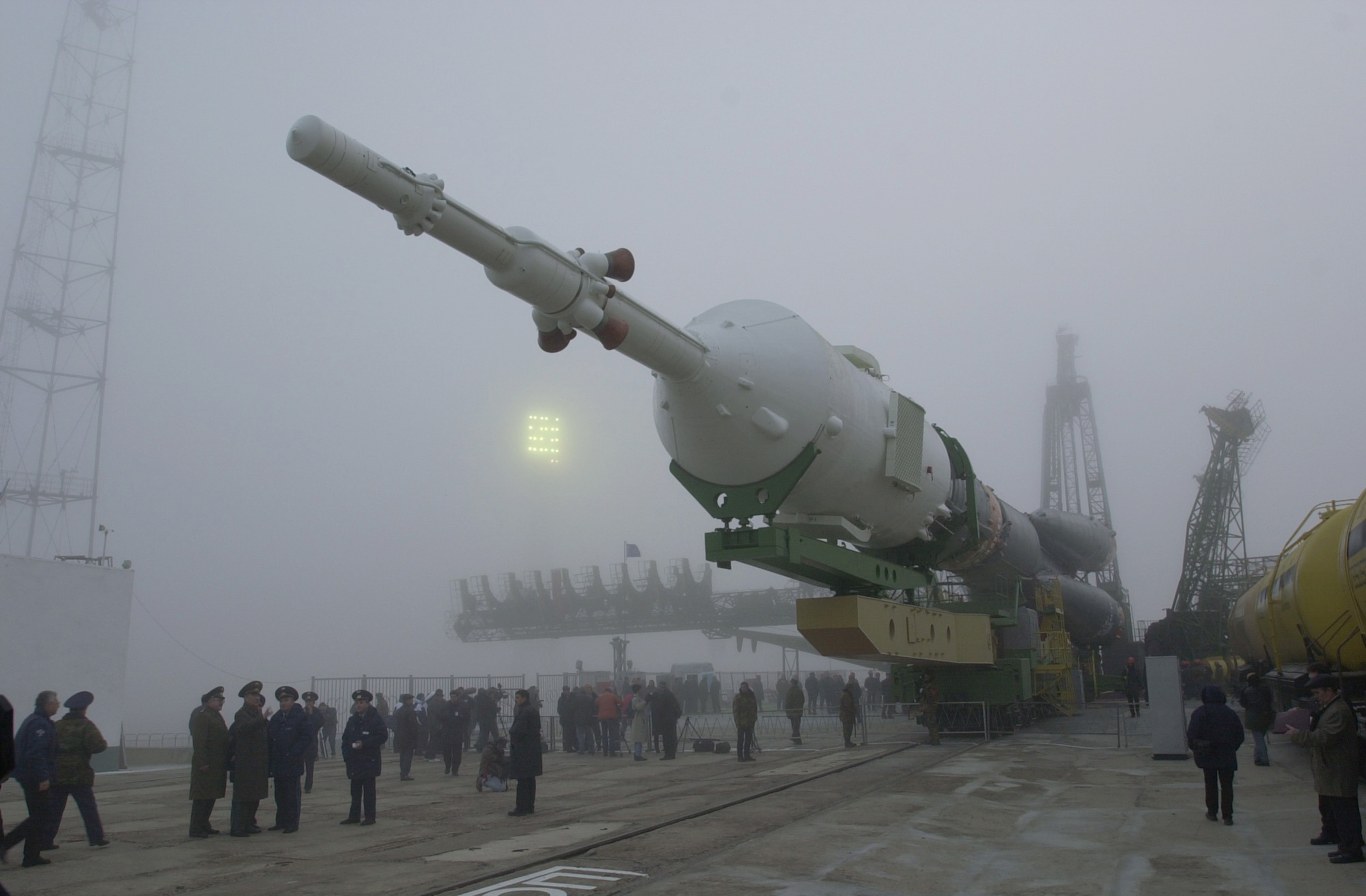
Expedition 1's Soyuz-U launch vehicle being transported to its launch pad on 29 October 2000

The three-member Expedition 1 crew successfully launched on 31 October 2000, at 07:52 UTC, atop a Soyuz-U rocket on Soyuz TM-31 from the Baikonur Cosmodrome in Kazakhstan; they used launch pad Gagarin's Start, from which the first human to fly in space, Yuri Gagarin, was launched in 1961. After 33 orbits of the Earth, and a series of rendezvous maneuvers performed by Gidzenko, they docked the Soyuz capsule to the aft port of the Zvezda Service Module on 2 November 2000, at 09:21 UTC. Ninety minutes after docking, Shepherd opened the hatch to Zvezda and the crew members entered the complex.

=== Alpha ===
At the end of the first day on the station, Shepherd requested the use of the radio call sign "Alpha", which he and Krikalev preferred to the more cumbersome "International Space Station". The name "Alpha" had previously been used for the station in the early 1990s, and following the request, its use was authorized for the whole of Expedition 1. Shepherd had been advocating the use of a new name to project managers for some time. Referencing a naval tradition in a pre-launch news conference he had said: "For thousands of years, humans have been going to sea in ships. People have designed and built these vessels, launched them with a good feeling that a name will bring good fortune to the crew and success to their voyage." Yuriy Semenov, the President of Russian Space Corporation Energia at the time, disapproved of the name "Alpha"; he felt that Mir was the first space station, and so he would have preferred the names "Beta" or "Mir 2" for the ISS.

=== First month ===
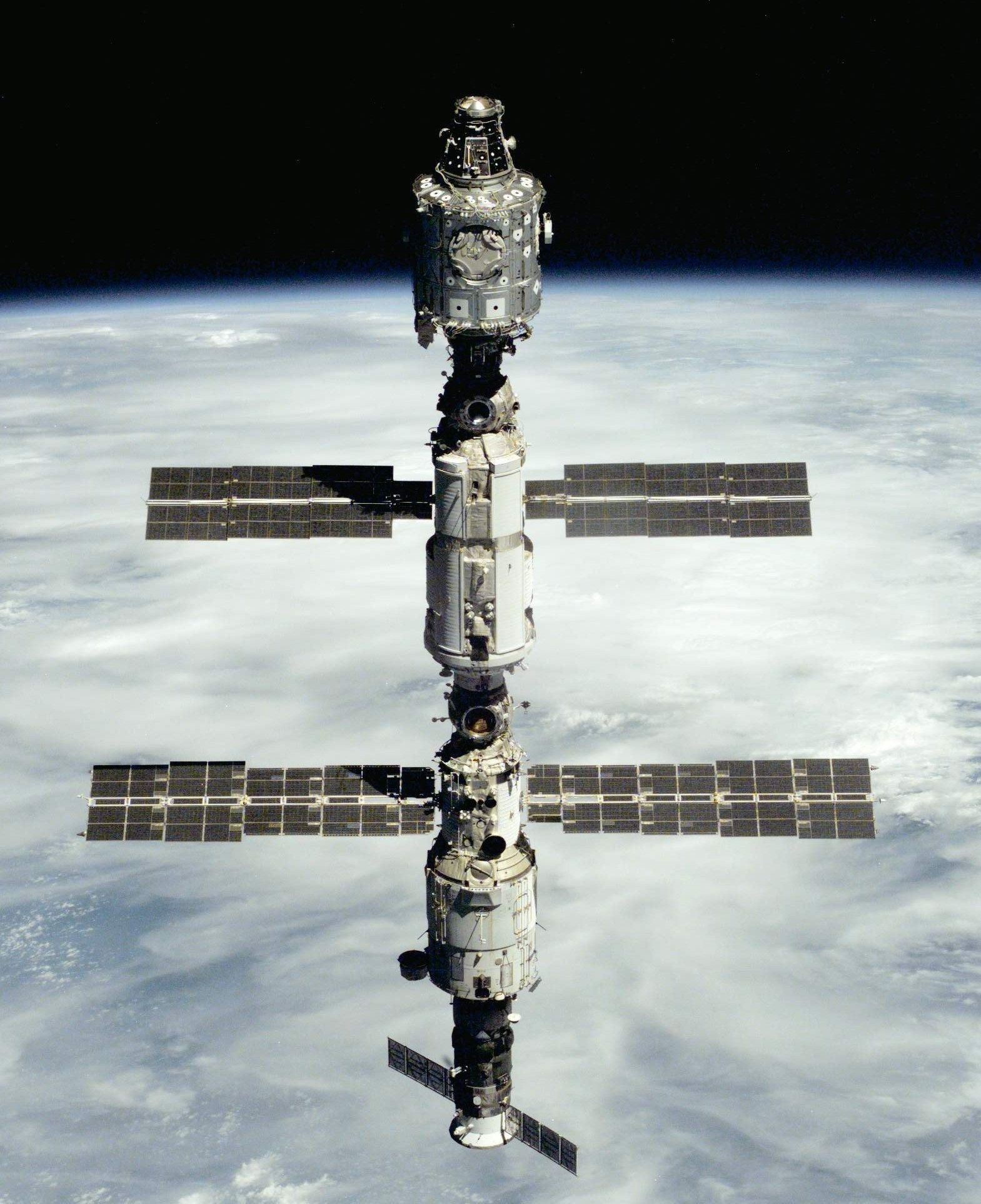
The configuration of the ISS at the start of Expedition 1. From top to bottom, the three modules are: Unity, Zarya and Zvezda.

In their first weeks on board, the Expedition 1 crew members activated critical life support systems and computer control, as well as unpacked supplies left behind for them by previous supply missions. At this time the station did not have enough electricity to heat all three pressurized modules, so Unity was left unused and unheated. Unity had been used for the past two years to allow U.S. flight controllers to command ISS systems and read station system data.

The Russian uncrewed resupply spacecraft Progress M1-4 docked to the station on 18 November. The Progress spacecraft's automatic docking system failed, necessitating a manual docking controlled by Gidzenko using the TORU docking system. Although manual dockings are routine, they have caused some concern among flight controllers since an attempt in 1997 which resulted in the spacecraft colliding with Mir, causing significant damage.

The astronauts had a heavy workload in the first month, as Shepherd told reporters in a space-to-ground interview: "To me, the biggest challenge is trying to pack 30 hours into an 18-hour work day." Some of the early tasks took longer than scheduled. For example, the activation of a food warmer in Zvezda's galley was scheduled for 30 minutes, but it took the astronauts a day and a half to turn it on.

=== STS-97 ===
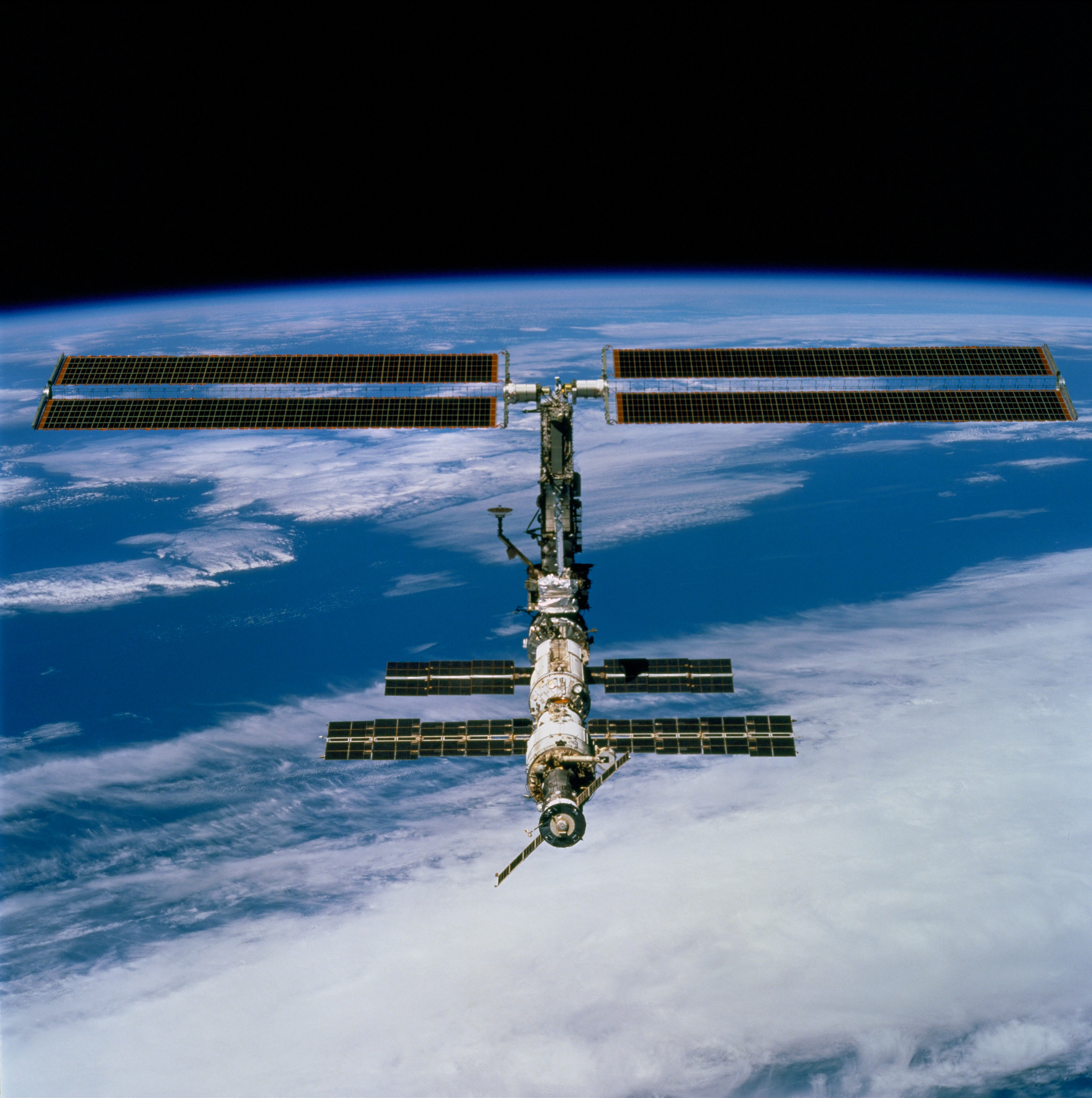
The ISS, taken from Endeavour on 9 December 2000 shortly after undocking. The new solar arrays are visible at the top.

Endeavour docked with the ISS on 2 December 2000, on mission STS-97, bringing four more Americans and a Canadian temporarily to the station. The shuttle also brought the first pair of U.S. provided photovoltaic arrays, which would provide crucial electricity for further development of the station. In total, STS-97 brought 17 tons of equipment to the ISS, which also included expandable metal girders, batteries, electronics and cooling equipment.

Three spacewalks were conducted by the crew of STS-97, all of which were completed prior to opening the hatch between shuttle and station. On 8 December, the hatch between the two was opened and the two crews greeted each other for the first time. It had remained closed to maintain their respective atmospheric pressures. The Expedition 1 crew took this opportunity to leave the station and tour the inside of the space shuttle, which was thought to be good for their psychological well-being.

=== Progress M1-4 ===
Prior to Endeavour docking, the Russian resupply spacecraft Progress M1-4, which came to the station in mid-November, was undocked to make room for the space shuttle. This Progress spacecraft remained undocked for the duration of STS-97, parked in orbit about 2,500 kilometers behind the station. It docked manually again with the station on 26 December by Gidzenko, after Endeavour left. The automatic docking system for this Progress spacecraft had failed on the first docking in November. The crew spent much of the following week unloading the Progress spacecraft.

=== Christmas and New Year ===
On Christmas Day, the Expedition 1 crew were given the day off work. They opened presents delivered by Endeavour and the Progress supply ship. They also each took turns speaking to their families. In the following days they did several video downlinks, some with Russian TV stations. The crew had a quiet New Year. Citing a Naval tradition, for the New Year's entry of the station's log, Shepherd provided a poem on behalf of the crew.

=== STS-98 ===
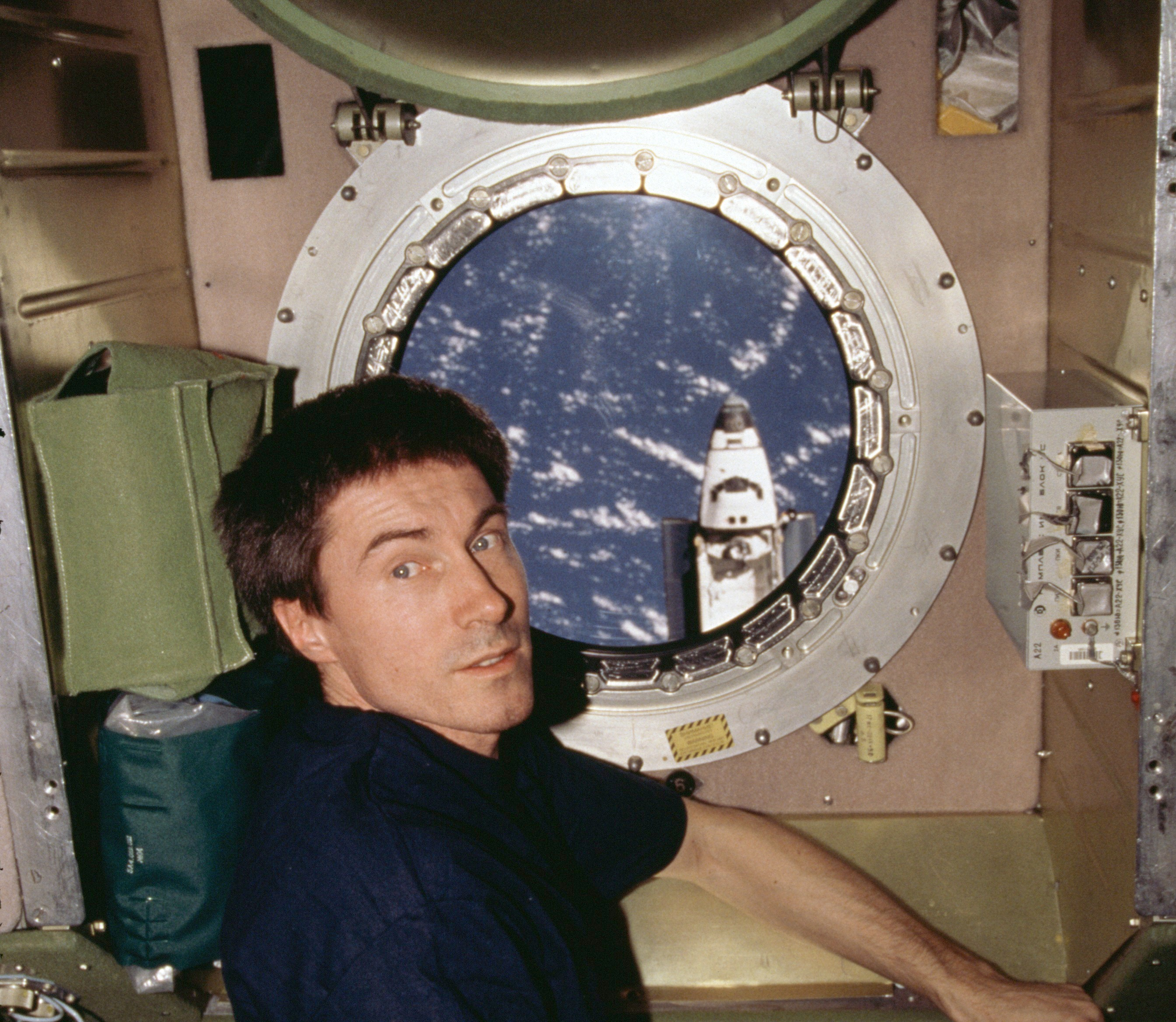
Krikalev in the Zvezda module. Atlantis is shown outside the window, flying mission STS-98.

On 9 February 2001, Space Shuttle Atlantis docked to the ISS, bringing the five American crew members of STS-98 temporarily to the station. The mission was originally planned for mid-January, but was delayed due to NASA's concerns about some cables on the shuttles. This mission brought the U.S. built Destiny laboratory, which has a mass of 16 short tons. It was installed with the use of the shuttle's robotic Canadarm, controlled by Marsha Ivins. Astronauts Thomas D. Jones and Robert L. Curbeam helped with the installation during a spacewalk. The Destiny module had a cost of US$1.4 billion, and would be used primarily for scientific research. During the spacewalk an ammonia coolant leak created a contamination scare, which happened when Curbeam was hooking up coolant lines to Destiny. The other two spacewalks went ahead without any problems. While the Shuttle was docked, the control of the station's orientation was switched from propellants to electrically powered gyroscopes, which had been installed in September 2000. The gyroscopes had not been used earlier due to the lack of key navigational electronics.

By the end of STS-98, the crew of Expedition 1 had been on the station for over three months, and Shepherd stated that he was "ready to come home". NASA used several techniques to prevent the three crew members from suffering the effects of the "three-month wall" psychological barrier, which had caused depression in previous astronauts. For example, they allowed more time for the crew to speak to their families via videophone, and they also encouraged them to watch movies and listen to music they like.

=== Progress M-44 ===
On 28 February the third Progress spacecraft to visit the ISS, Progress M-44, docked to the Zvezda module. It brought air, food, rocket fuel and other equipment. It remained docked until Expedition 2, when it was intentionally burnt up during atmospheric reentry, like all Progress spacecraft.

=== STS-102 ===
Space Shuttle Discovery docked on 10 March 2001, bringing to the ISS the new long-duration three-person crew of Expedition 2, as well as four short-term crew members of STS-102. A few hours after docking, the hatch opened, and all ten astronauts greeted each other, setting a new record for the number of people simultaneously in the ISS. The day after docking, American astronauts Jim Voss and Susan Helms began a spacewalk which ended up being nearly nine hours long, and still holds the record for the longest spacewalk ever performed, as of August 2010. The length of the spacewalk was partially due to some mistakes, including Voss accidentally releasing a small tool. Unable to retrieve it, NASA engineers tracked the tool, and decided to use Discovery's thrusters on 14 March to boost the station four kilometers higher, to ensure the ISS would not collide with the piece of space debris.

=== Transferring expedition crews ===
By 14 March, the expedition crews had completed the change over, but until the shuttle undocked, Shepherd officially remained commander of the station. The morning of the 14th the astronauts' wake-up call was the song "Should I Stay or Should I Go" by The Clash, at the request of Shepherd's wife. Shepherd, a former Navy SEAL, said during the change over ceremony: "May the good will, spirit and sense of mission we had enjoyed on board endure. Sail her well." The commander of Discovery, Jim Wetherbee, said "For Captain Shepherd and his crew, we hold you in admiration as we prepare to bring you home. This has been an arduous duty for you. This ship was not built in a safe harbor. It was built on the high seas."

At about 01:30 UTC, one hour before his departure, Expedition 1 Commander Bill Shepherd held a "change of command ceremony" to transfer control of the station to Expedition 2 Commander Yury Usachev.

=== Undocking and landing ===
The crew's four and a half-month tour aboard the ISS officially ended on 19 March 2001, when the hatch between Discovery and the ISS was closed at 02:32 UTC. At 04:32 UTC, Mission Specialist Andy Thomas sent a command that released the docking mechanism and springs within the mechanism gently pushed the shuttle away from the station. During the initial separation, steering jets on both the shuttle and station were disabled to avoid any inadvertent firings. Once Discovery was about 2 feet (0.61 m) away from the station, shuttle pilot James Kelly, standing at the aft flight deck controls turned the steering jets back on and fired them to begin slowly moving away.

The Expedition 1 crew returned home to Earth on STS-102, landing on 21 March 2001, on a rare night landing at 2:30 am local time. Two days after the landing, coincidentally, Mir was intentionally burned up during atmospheric reentry, ending its 15 years in orbit.

== Daily activities ==
In a typical day, each crew member divided his time between physical exercise, station assembly and maintenance, experiments, communications with ground personnel, personal time, and bio-needs activities (such as rest and eating). The crew's daily schedule usually operated on UTC; for example, a typical morning had been scheduled to begin with an electronic wake-up tone at about 05:00 UTC. But during the expedition, a more typical wake-up time was actually between 06:00 and 07:00 UTC. The crew's sleep habits were sometimes shifted to accommodate the schedules of visiting shuttles or resupply vehicles.

Following the wake-up call, the crew was given some time to clean up, have breakfast, and read e-mail which had been uplinked to them from flight controllers. Their work day included a lunch break at midday (UTC), and ended with a mid-afternoon planning session with flight controllers, regarding the next day's activities. Most days ended with some entertainment, with the crew watching all or part of a movie; this was thought to be good for crew bonding as well as their psychological well-being. After watching 2010, the sequel to 2001: A Space Odyssey, Shepherd commented, "[There is] something strange about watching a movie about a space expedition when you're actually on a space expedition".

An important part of the crew's schedule was regular exercise. They had three pieces of equipment for this: a stationary bicycle, a treadmill (TVIS), and a resistance device (IRED) for weight-lifting. The bicycle malfunctioned in mid-December 2000, and wasn't fixed until March. The treadmill, which used bungee cords to keep the crew member in place, was designed to reduce the vibrations caused by running. A normal treadmill would have produced enough vibrations to shake the station, and potentially affect the sensitive science experiments on board. The treadmill malfunctioned near the end of February, but some in-flight maintenance fixed the problem within a week.

=== Ground communications ===
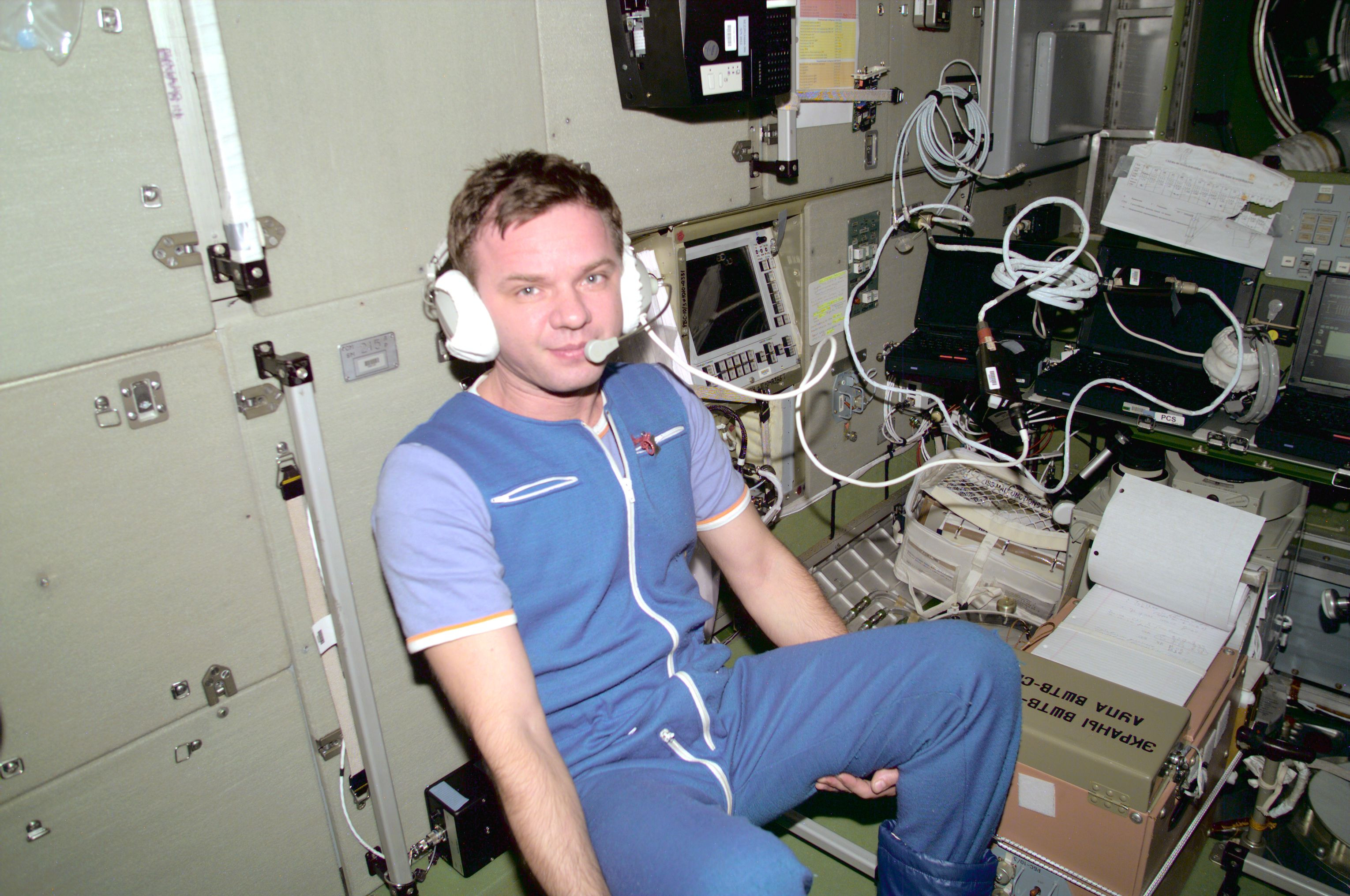
Yuri Gidzenko, in the Zvezda Service Module, communicates with ground controllers

Until the Unity module was available for use a month into the mission, the astronauts used the Russian VHF communications gear (also called the "Regul radio link") in Zvezda and the Zarya module to communicate with the Russian Mission Control Center (known as "TsUP") in Korolev, outside Moscow. The Russian technology didn't have the use of satellites, so they were restricted to ground passes (called a "comm pass") which lasted for only 10–20 minutes. With the arrival of the solar arrays on STS-97, they activated the S-band Early Communication gear in the Unity Module, allowing for more continuous communication with Mission Control in Houston via NASA's network of Tracking and Data Relay Satellites.

During STS-106 in September 2000, the equipment for a ham radio was delivered to the station. The first 'ham' contact with the ground by the Expedition 1 crew was on 13 November 2000 on a pass over Moscow, shortly followed by contact with Goddard Space Flight Center in Greenbelt, Maryland. The crew reported that "Voice quality of ham radio continues to be well above any of our other links."

The Amateur Radio on the International Space Station project had the crew of the station to make brief windows to radio contact with schools and clubs on the ground. The first school to be contacted by the ISS was Luther Burbank School in southwest Chicago. The contact had been planned for 19 December 2000, but due to technical problems, it was delayed to 21 December 2000. Due to the speed of the space station, the window of radio contact only lasted for 5–10 minutes, which was usually enough for 10 to 20 questions.

=== Science activities ===
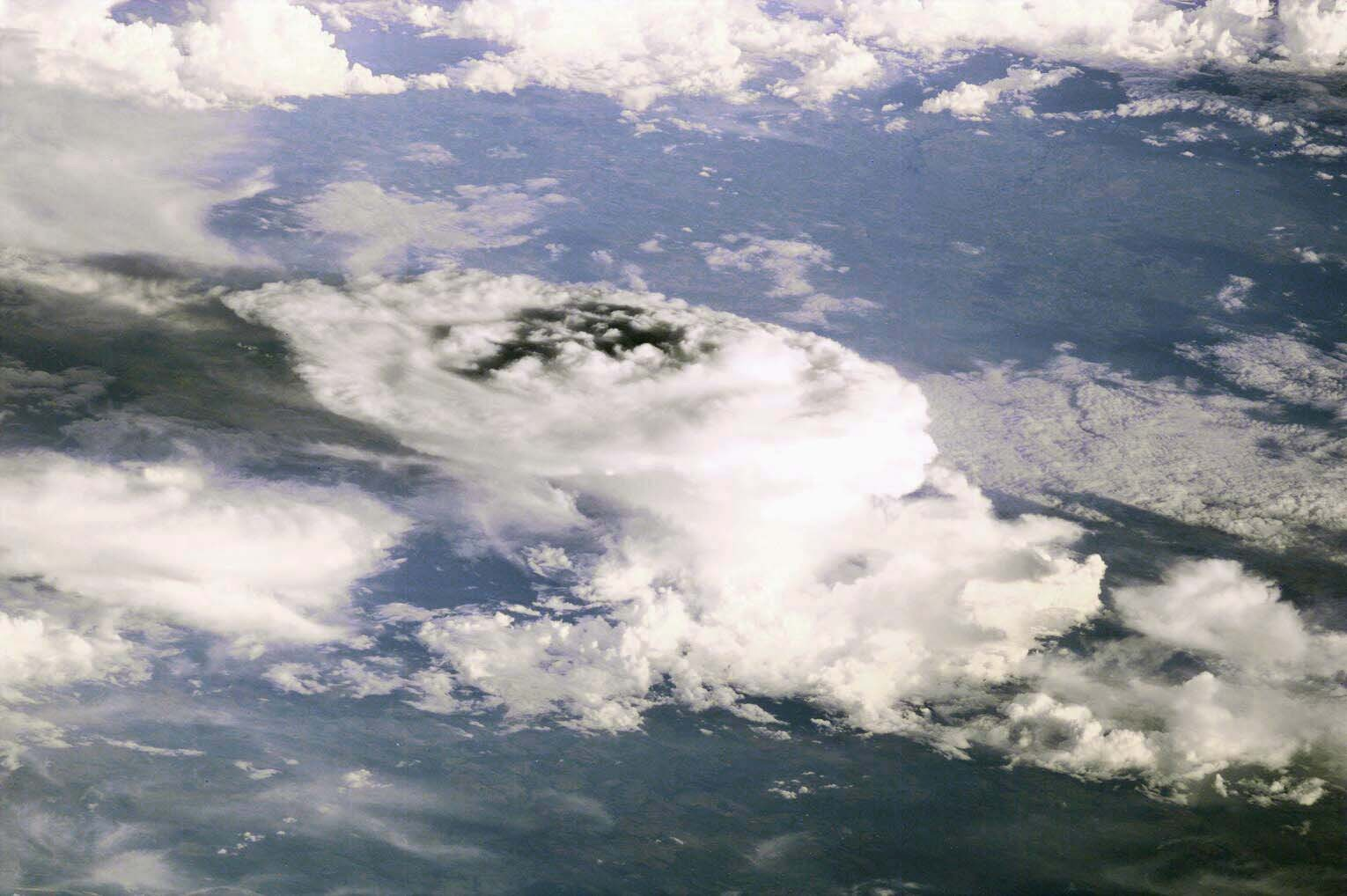
First image of the Earth downlinked from the ISS in November 2000, taken with a Kodak DCS 460.

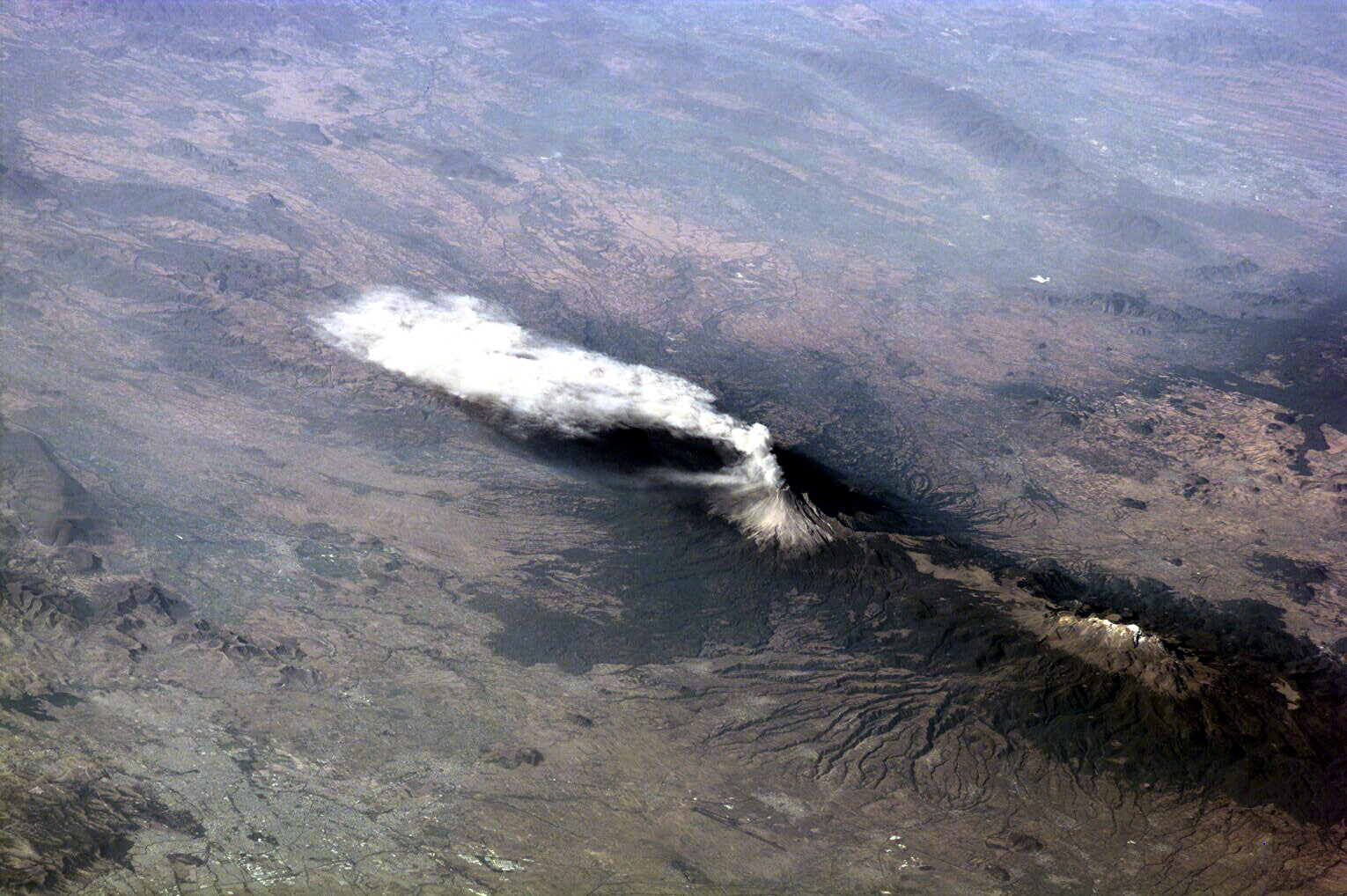
On 23 January 2001 the crew photographed a plume of volcanic ash from Popocatépetl volcano, Mexico.

The crew of Expedition 1 had fewer science experiments to conduct than subsequent expeditions, due to the priority placed on station construction. The plasma crystal experiment, known as PKE-Nefedov, was one of the first natural science experiments conducted on the space station. It was a collaboration between the Max Planck Institute for Extraterrestrial Physics in Germany, and the Institute for High Energy Densities (part of the Russian Academy of Sciences).

Like previous missions, the astronauts took many photos of Earth from the station, over 700 in total, which have been made freely available. These Crew Earth Observations, are intended to record dynamic events on the Earth's surface such as storms, fires, or volcanoes. For example, a photo of 1 January 2001 shows Mount Cleveland, Alaska, with a plume of smoke, prior to its eruption the following month. On 23 January 2001, the crew observed a unique perspective of a plume of volcanic ash coming from Popocatépetl, an active volcano 70 kilometres southeast of Mexico City.

An example of a low-maintenance experiment was the protein crystal growth experiment, which had also been flown on previous shuttle missions. The goal was to produce better protein crystallizations than those produced on the Earth, and hence allowing for a more accurate model of protein structures. Of the 23 proteins and viruses attempted during Expedition 1, only four resulted in successful crystallizations, which was a lower success rate than predicted. Of those successful was the low-calorie sweetener Thaumatin, whose crystals diffracted at a higher resolution than Earth-grown crystal, which resulted in a more accurate protein structure model.

Another research activity was measuring the crew's heart rates and the station's carbon dioxide levels to determine the effect of exercise on the station.

=== IMAX filming ===
Throughout the mission the Expedition 1 crew filmed footage for use in the IMAX documentary film, Space Station 3D. Highlights of the footage include the first entry into the Destiny module, during STS-98; the Expedition 1 crew showering and shaving in zero gravity; and the docking of STS-102, followed by the change over to the Expedition 2 crew.
