= Yuri Gidzenko =

Russian cosmonaut (born 1962)

- Юрий Гидзенко
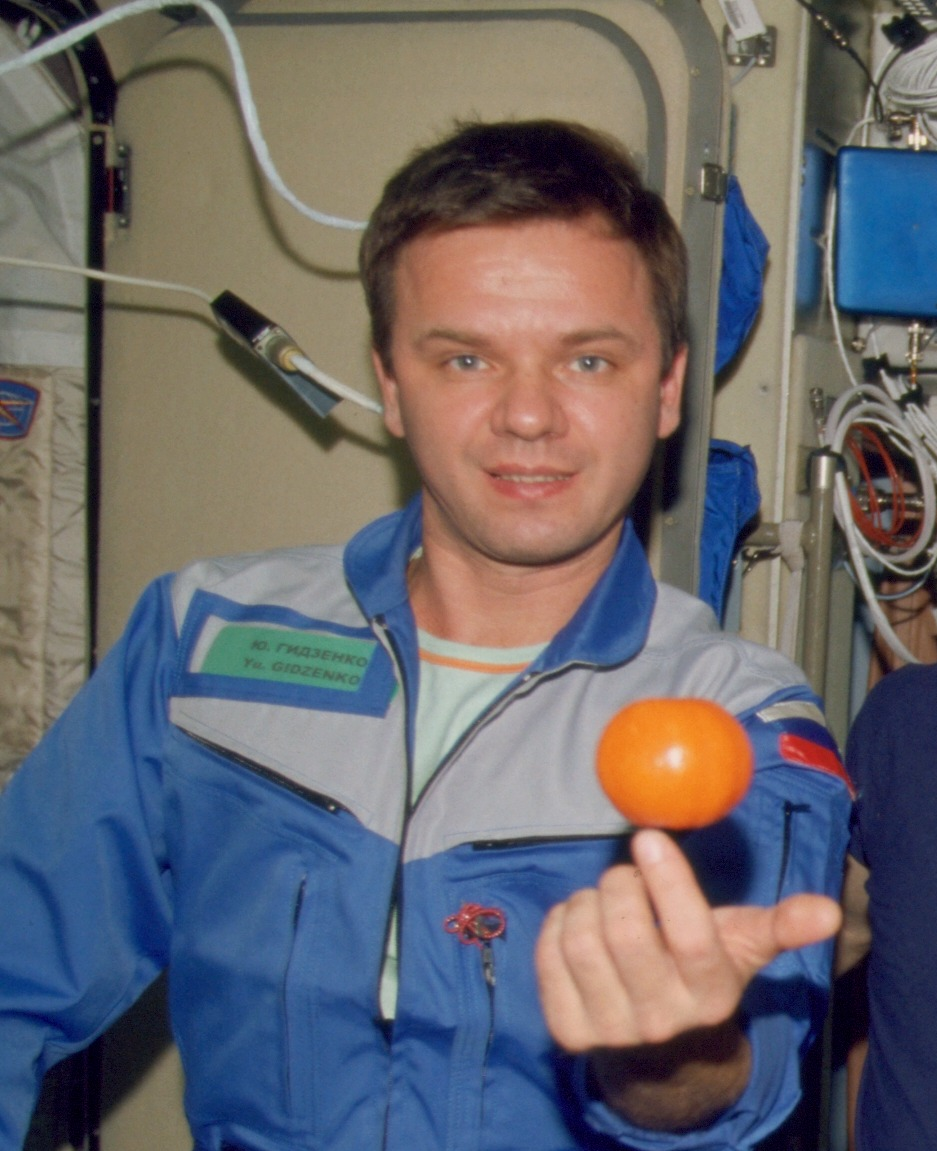
- Born: March 26, 1962 (age 64); Yelanets, Ukrainian SSR, Soviet Union
- Occupation: Pilot
- Awards: Hero of the Russian Federation
- Space career

Roscosmos cosmonaut
- Status: Retired
- Time in space: 329d 22h 44min
- Selection: 1987
- Total EVAs: 2
- Total EVA time: 3 hours 43 minutes
- Missions: Soyuz TM-22 (Mir EO-20), Soyuz TM-31/STS-102 (Expedition 1), Soyuz TM-34/Soyuz TM-33 (ISS EP-3)
- Retired: July 15, 2001

Yuri Pavlovich Gidzenko (Russian: Юрий Павлович Гидзенко; born March 26, 1962) is a former Russian cosmonaut. He was a test cosmonaut of the Yuri Gagarin Cosmonaut Training Center (TsPK). Gidzenko has flown into space three times and has lived on board the Mir and the International Space Station. He has also conducted two career spacewalks. Although he retired on July 15, 2001, he continued his employment by a special contract until Soyuz TM-34 concluded. Since 2004 to May 2009, Gidzenko was the Director of the 3rd department within the TsPK. Since May 2009 he has served as the Deputy Chief of Cosmonaut Training Center TsPK.

== Personal ==
Gidzenko was born on March 26, 1962, Elanets, Mykolaiv Oblast, Ukraine (then in the Soviet Union). Gidzenko is married to Olga Vladimirovna Shapovalova. They have two sons, Sergei, born in 1986 and Alexander, born in 1988. His father, Pavel Vasilyevich Gidzenko, and mother, Galina Mikhailovna Gidzenko, live in Berezovka-2, Odessa area. Gidzenko's hobbies include football, swimming, reading of literature, photography, and walks in forests.

== Education ==
Gidzenko graduated from the Higher Military Pilot School in Kharkiv in 1983. Gidzenko graduated from the Moscow State University of Geodesy and Cartography (MIIGAiK) in 1994 specializing in geodesy and cartography.

== Experience ==
Upon graduation from the pilot school in 1983, Gidzenko served as a pilot and as a senior pilot in the RAir Force units of the Odessa military district. He was a 3rd class military pilot. Gidzenko was trained to fly three types of aircraft and has logged a total flying time of 850 hours. He is also a parachute-landing training instructor and has made 170 jumps.

== Cosmonaut career ==
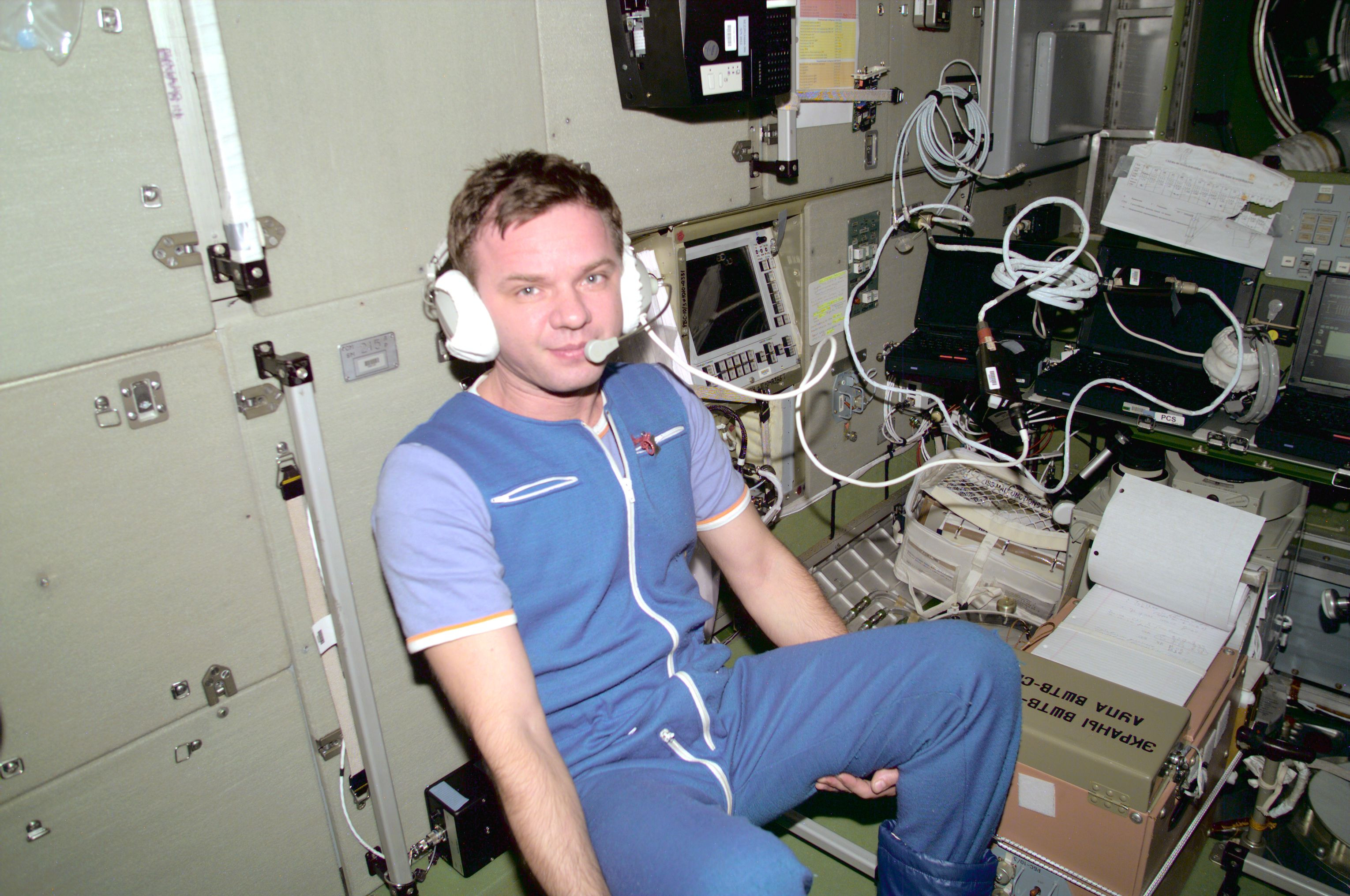
Gidzenko on board the Zvezda Service Module of the ISS communicates with ground controllers.

From December 1987 to June 1989, Gidzenko attended basic space training as a test cosmonaut candidate. Since September 1989 he attended advanced training as a test cosmonaut candidate. From March to October 1994 he trained for a space flight as a back-up crew commander (17th Primary Expedition/Euro-Mir-94 Program). From November 1994 to August 1995 he attended training for a space flight aboard the Soyuz TM transport vehicle/Mir orbital complex as the Expedition 20 Primary Crew Commander (Euro-Mir-95 Program).

=== Mir EO-20 (Euromir 95) ===
Yuri Gidzenko served aboard Mir as the commander of the long duration Mir EO-20 (Euromir 95) expedition from September 3, 1995, to February 29, 1996, and logged 179 days in space. One of the crewmembers on this mission was the ESA astronaut, Thomas Reiter. The Soyuz TM-22 carrying Gidzenko, cosmonaut Sergei Avdeyev and Reiter lifted off from the Baikonour cosmodrome on September 3, 1995, at 9:00 UTC. After a two-day autonomous flight the Soyuz spacecraft docked automatically with the Mir space station's -X docking port on September 5. The three member crew became the 20th Mir resident crew. During the first week after docking, Euromir 95 crew and the resident Mir EO-19 crew of cosmonauts Anatoly Solovyev and Nikolai Budarin conducted joint work. Gidzenko and his crewmembers used this time to get familiarize with the status of the onboard systems and experiments. The scientific objectives of Euromir 95 were to study effects of microgravity on the human body, to experiment with the development on new materials in a space environment, to capture samples of cosmic dust and man-made particles in low Earth orbit, and to test new space equipment. During the next months joint Russian-German research work were performed on board the Mir in the fields of life sciences (18 experiments), astrophysics (5 experiments), materials science (8 experiments) and technology (10 experiments). The crew also performed common work with the crew of STS-74. They cooperated in medical experiments and environmental investigations designed as part of International Space Station (ISS) Phase I research.

During Euromir 95, an uncrewed cargo spacecraft, Progress M-29 visited the Mir on October 10. Progress M-29 brought about 2.5 tons of fresh supplies and equipment for the Mir EO-20 crew. On October 17, 1995, Russian and ESA officials decided to add another 44 days to the originally planned 135 days of the mission duration. On December 20, Progress M-30 docked at the Kvant port of Mir. It delivered 2300 kg of fuel, crew supplies, and research and medical equipment for use on the extended Euromir 95 mission

On February 29, 1996, Gidzenko returned to Earth on board the Soyuz TM-22 capsule which landed at 10:42 UTC, 105 km northeast of Arkalyk.

=== Expedition 1 ===
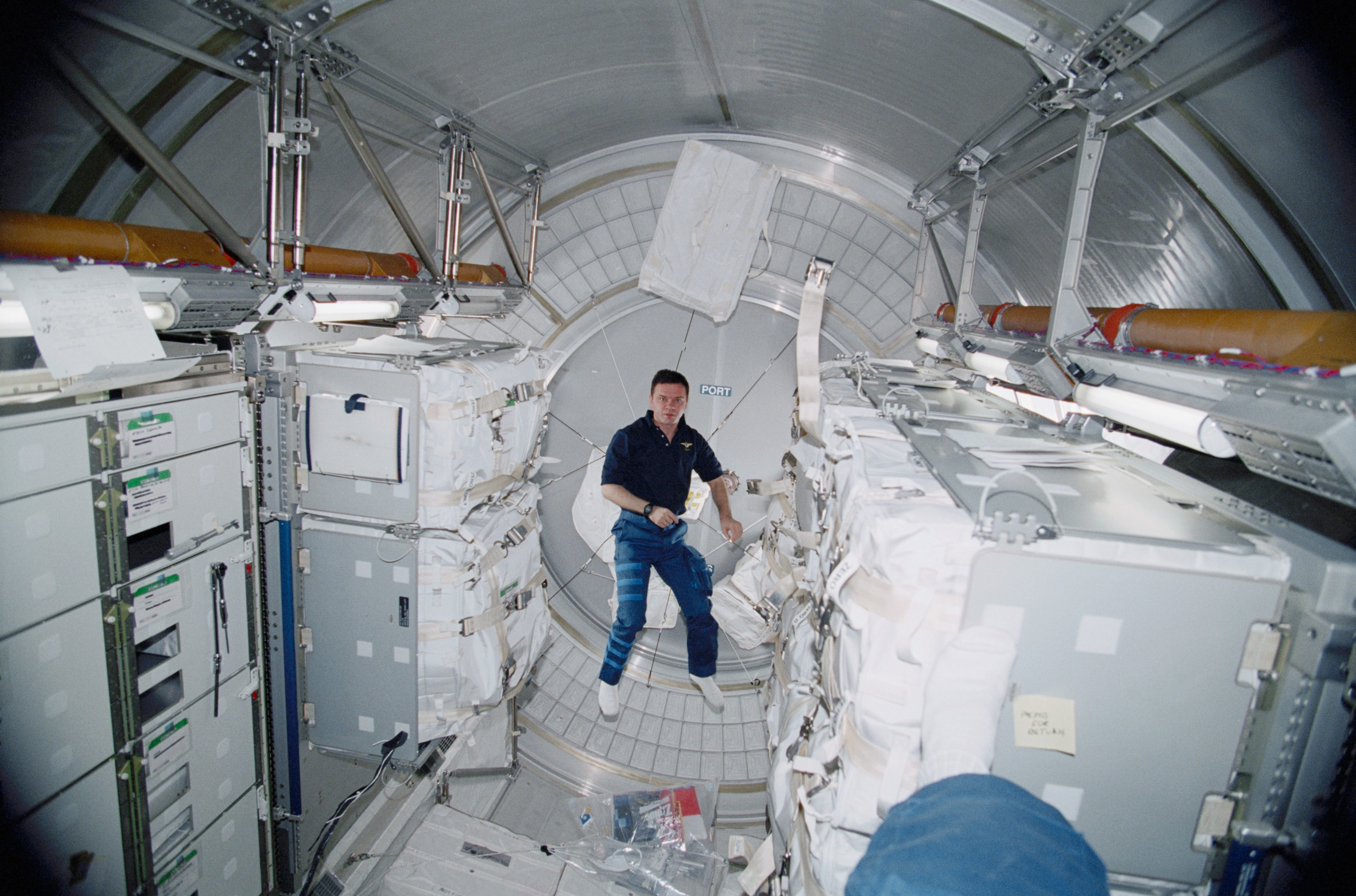
Yuri Gidzenko, Expedition 1 flight engineer aboard the Multipurpose Logistics Module (MPLM), Leonardo.

From November 2000 to March 2001, Gidzenko was part of the first permanent ISS resident crew, the Expedition 1. He along with cosmonaut Sergei Krikalev and NASA astronaut William Shepherd was launched into space on board the Soyuz TM-31 spacecraft which lifted off from the Baikonour cosmodrome on October 31, 2000, at 07:52:47 UTC. Gidzenko served as the Soyuz commander. After two days of solo flight, on November 2, the Soyuz spacecraft docked with the aft port the Zvezda Service Module at 09:21 UTC. Gidzenko joined the Expedition 1 crew as a flight engineer. The crew were on board the ISS for over four months. They helped with assembly tasks as new elements, including the U.S. Destiny Laboratory, were added to the orbiting outpost. In their first weeks on board, Gidzenko, Shepherd and Krikalev activated critical life support systems and unpacked Station components, clothing, laptop computers, office equipment, cables and electrical gear left behind for them by previous Shuttle crews which conducted logistic supply flights to the new complex over the past two years.

Expedition 1 crew hosted three visiting Shuttle crews, STS-97, STS-98 and STS-102. Gidzenko helped to unload two uncrewed Russian Progress resupply vehicles.

In March 2001, Expedition 1 crewmembers returned to Earth aboard the Space Shuttle Discovery at the completion of the STS-102. Discovery landed at the Kennedy Space Center's Runway 15, on March 21 at 02:33:06 EST. On board Soyuz/shuttle and ISS, Gidzenko logged 140 days in space.

=== Soyuz TM-34/Soyuz TM-33 ===
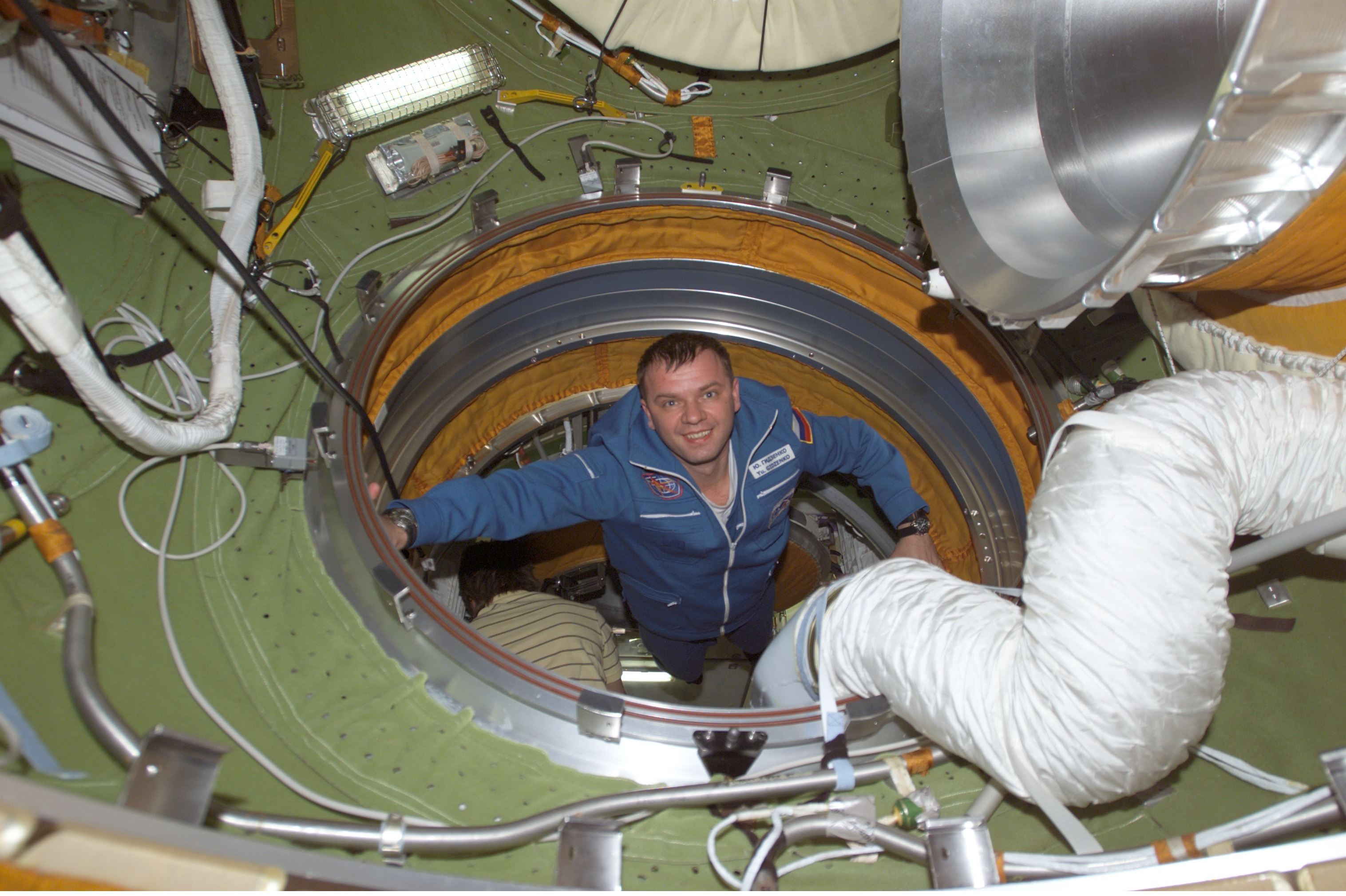
Soyuz 4 taxi commander Gidzenko enters the Zarya's pressurized adapter on the ISS.

He was launched on April 25, 2002, on the Soyuz TM-34 (Soyuz 4 taxi crew) mission along with ESA astronaut Roberto Vittori and South African Space Tourist Mark Shuttleworth. The Soyuz TM-34 lifted off from the Baikonour cosmodrome at 06:26:35 UTC. Gidzenko served as the Soyuz commander for the flight. After two days of solo flight, the Soyuz docked with the nadir port of the Zarya module at 07:55 UTC. Once there at the ISS, Gidzenko, Vittori and Shuttleworth conducted joint operations with the ISS resident Expedition 4 crew, performed educational and science activities and exchanged seat liners from the Soyuz TM-34 to the old Soyuz TM-33.

On May 5, Gidzenko returned to Earth onboard the Soyuz TM-33 spacecraft. Soyuz TM-33 undocked from the Pirs Docking Compartment and landed 26 km south east of Arkalyk at 03:51:53 UTC. On board Soyuz TM-33/TM-34 and the ISS, Gidzenko logged 9 days in space.

=== Spacewalks ===
Gidzenko has performed two career spacewalks during his stay on board the Mir space station.

On December 8, 1995, Gizenko performed his first career spacewalk. He and cosmonaut Avedeyev began the spacewalk at 19:23 UTC. The two spacewalkers reconfigured the docking unit at the front of the Mir base block to prepare it for arrival of the Priroda module. From inside the depressurized docking unit, the two cosmonauts moved the Konus docking unit from the +Z to the -Z docking port, where the Priroda module was docked. The spacewalk lasted 37 minutes.

On February 8, 1996, Gidzenko performed his second career spacewalk. He and ESA astronaut Thomas Reiter began the spacewalk at 14:03 UTC. At the beginning, they moved a maneuvering unit stored inside the Kvant 2 airlock and attached it to the exterior of the module. The spacewalkers then climbed out the Kvant 2 hatch and again used the Strela boom to maneuver to the forward end of Spektr, where they retrieved the two cassettes they had deployed in October 1995. They installed a new cassette in the facility and, with Adeyev's assistance from inside the station, verified that it would operate. Although originally scheduled to last about 5 hours and 30 minutes, the spacewalking activity was shortened to 3 hours and 6 minutes by an aborted task on a Kristall antenna. The Russian officials canceled the antenna work when the cosmonauts were unable to loosen the bolts on a joint of the antenna.

== Filmography ==
- Space Station 3D

== Honours and awards ==
- Hero of the Russian Federation (April 1, 1996) – for the successful implementation of spaceflight on the orbital scientific research complex Mir and displaying courage and heroism
- Order of Merit for the Fatherland;
  - 3rd class (August 2, 2004) – for outstanding contribution to space exploration, strengthening friendship and cooperation between nations
  - 4th class (April 5, 2002) – for their courage and professionalism shown during the implementation of long-duration space flight on the International Space Station
- Order of Military Merit (March 2, 2000) – a great service to the state in the development of crewed space flight
- Medal "For Merit in Space Exploration" (April 12, 2011) – for the great achievements in the field of research, development and use of outer space, many years of diligent work, public activities
- NASA Distinguished Public Service Medal – "For outstanding public services" (2003)
- Pilot-Cosmonaut of the Russian Federation (April 1, 1996)

== See also ==
- List of Heroes of the Russian Federation
