= Soyuz TM-31 =

First crewed spaceflight to the ISS

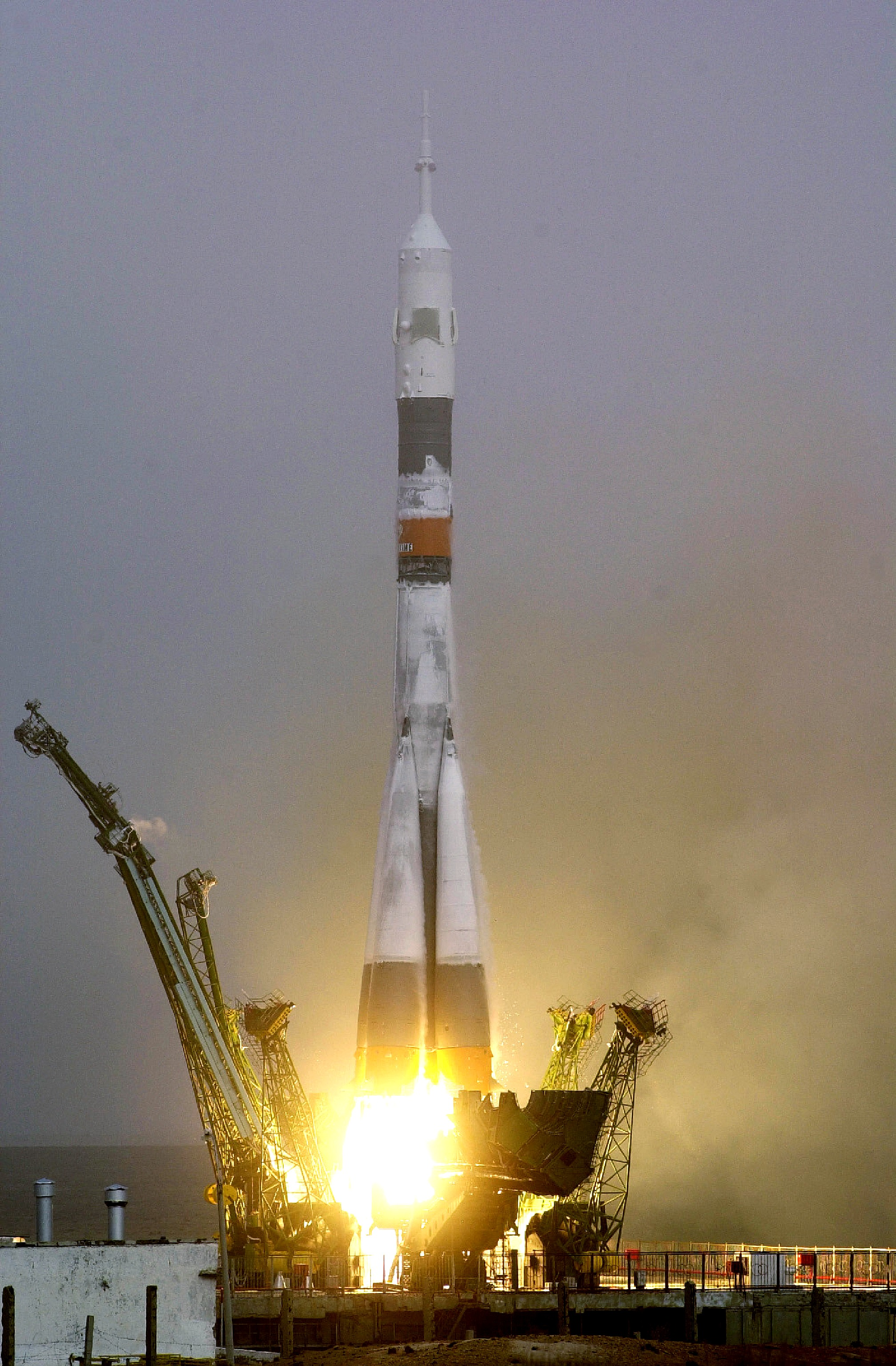
- Soyuz TM-31 launch
- Mission type: ISS crew transport
- Operator: Russian Space Agency
- COSPAR ID: 2000-070A
- SATCAT no.: 26603
- Mission duration: 186 days, 21 hours, 48 minutes, 41 seconds
- Orbits completed: ~3,040

Spacecraft properties
- Spacecraft: Soyuz 7K-STM No.205
- Spacecraft type: Soyuz-TM
- Manufacturer: Energia

Crew
- Crew size: 3
- Launching: Yuri Gidzenko; Sergei Krikalev; William Shepherd
- Landing: Talgat Musabayev; Yuri Baturin; Dennis Tito
- Callsign: Uran

Start of mission
- Launch date: October 31, 2000, 07:52:47 UTC
- Rocket: Soyuz-U
- Launch site: Baikonur, Site 1/5
- Contractor: Progress

End of mission
- Landing date: May 6, 2001, 05:41:28 UTC
- Landing site: 90 kilometres (56 mi) NE of Arkalyk (50°38′42″N 66°43′54″E)

Orbital parameters
- Reference system: Geocentric
- Regime: Low Earth
- Perigee altitude: 190 kilometres (120 mi)
- Apogee altitude: 249 kilometres (155 mi)
- Inclination: 51.57°
- Period: 88.6 minutes

Docking with ISS
- Docking port: Zvezda aft
- Docking date: 2 November 2000, 09:21:03 UTC
- Undocking date: 24 February 2001, 10:06 UTC
- Time docked: 114 days, 44 minutes

Docking with ISS (relocation)
- Docking port: Zarya nadir
- Docking date: 24 February 2001, 10:37 UTC
- Undocking date: 18 April 2001, 12:40 UTC
- Time docked: 53 days, 2 hours, 3 minutes

Docking with ISS (relocation)
- Docking port: Zvezda aft
- Docking date: 18 April 2001, 13:01 UTC
- Undocking date: 6 May 2001, 02:21:09 UTC
- Time docked: 17 days, 13 hours, 20 minutes
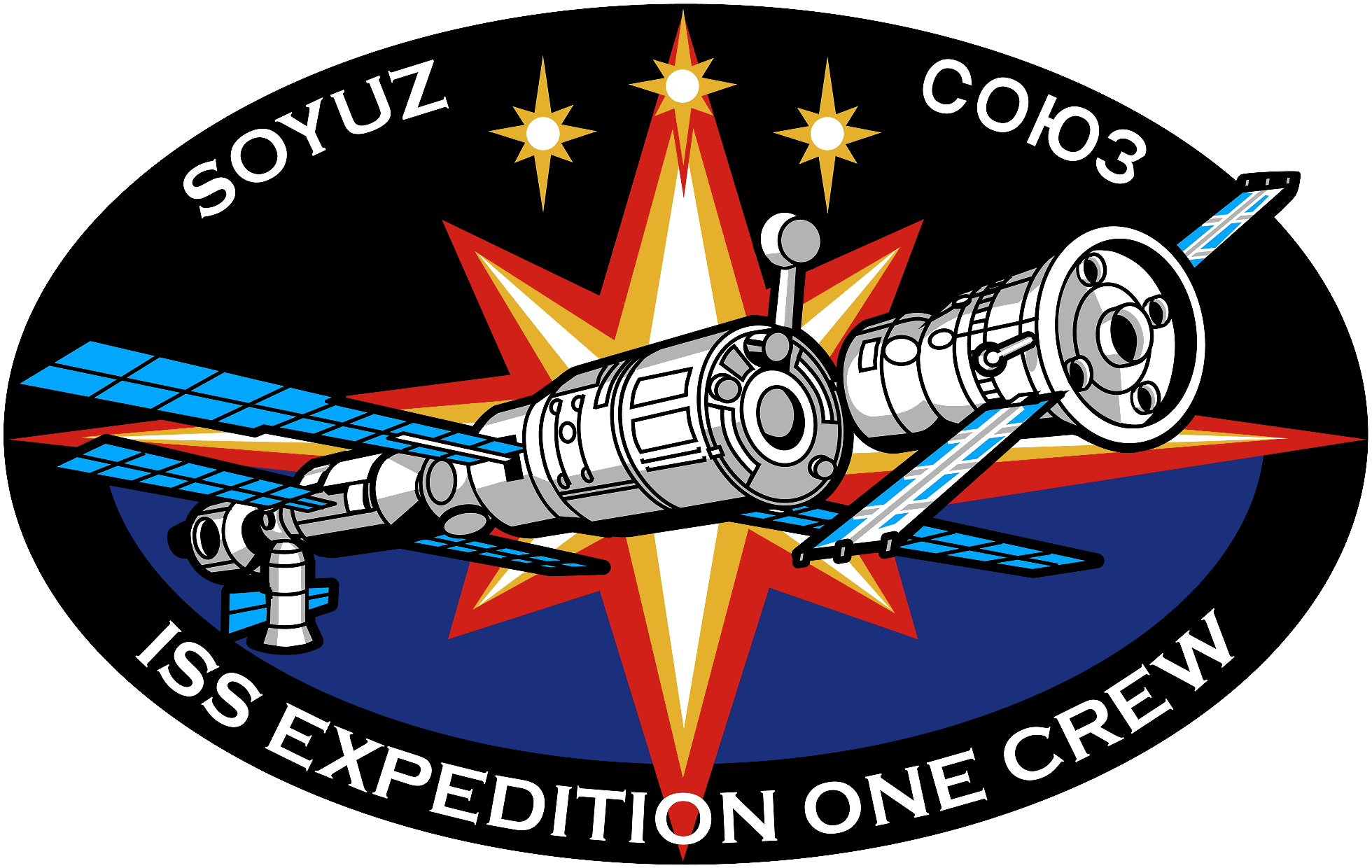
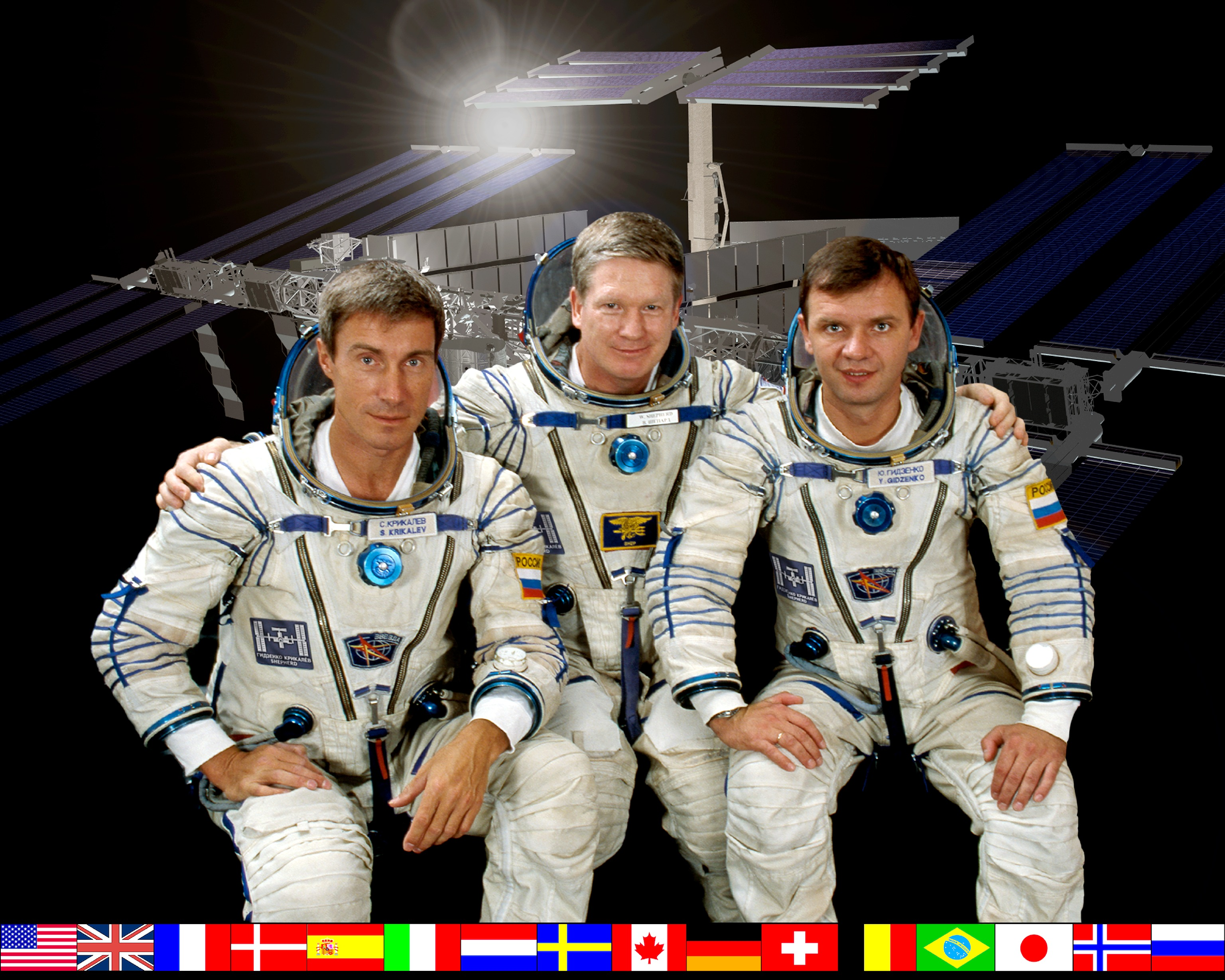
- Crew launching, from left: Krikalev, Shepherd and Gidzenko Soyuz programme (Crewed missions)

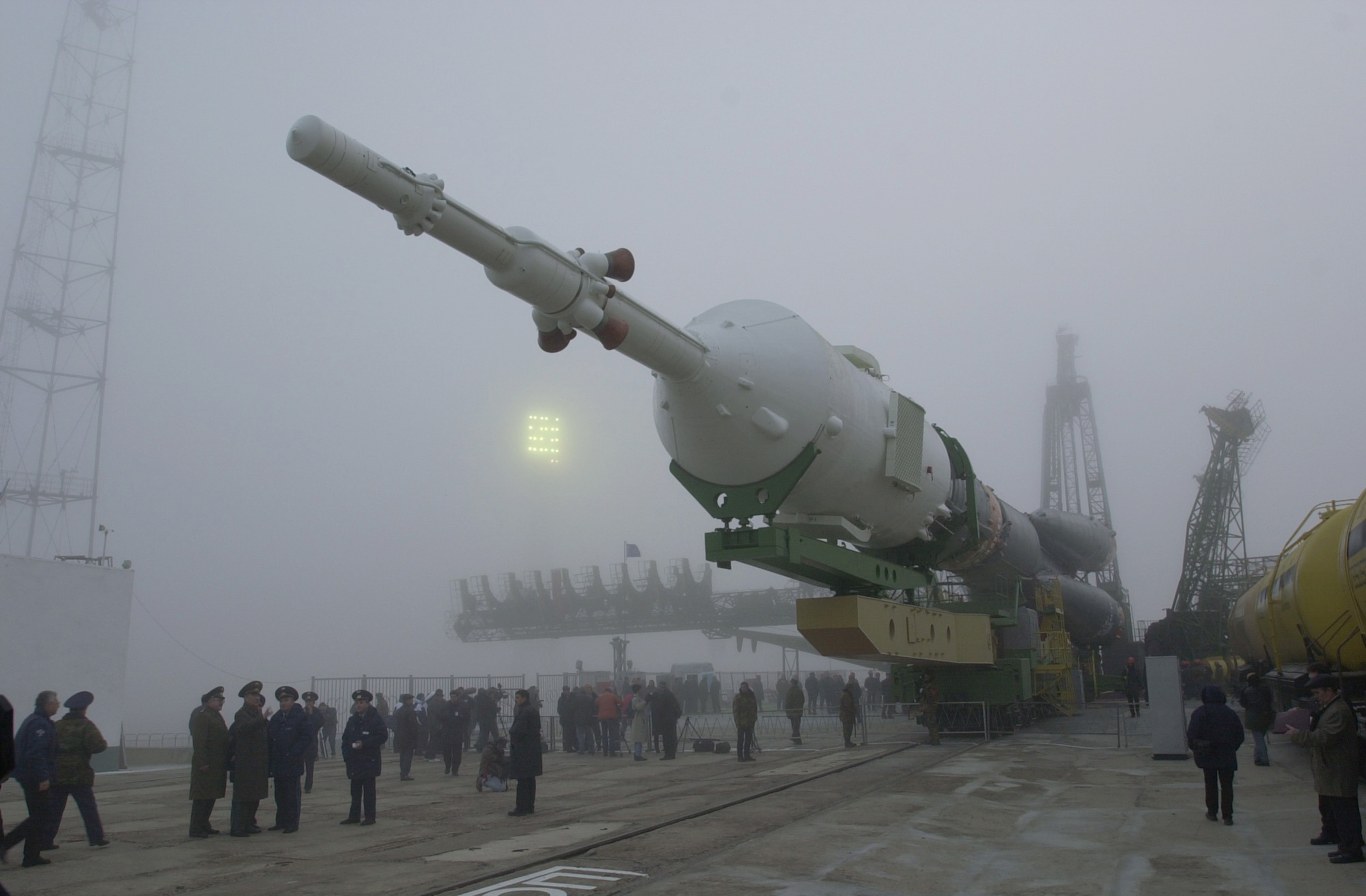
Soyuz TM-31 is transported to the Launch Pad at the Baikonur complex, 29 October 2000

Soyuz TM-31 was the first Soyuz spaceflight to dock with the International Space Station (ISS). The spacecraft carried the members of Expedition 1, the first long-duration ISS crew. It was launched from Baikonur Cosmodrome in Kazakhstan at 07:52 UT on October 31, 2000, by a Soyuz-U rocket.

The crew consisted of Russian cosmonauts Yuri Gidzenko and Sergei Krikalev, and American astronaut William Shepherd. Gidzenko was commander of the flight up, but once aboard the station, Shepherd became commander of the long-duration mission Expedition 1. It is notable for beginning the continuous occupation of space from October 31, 2000 to the present.

== Crew ==
Position	Launching crew	Landing crew
Commander	(Russia) Yuri Gidzenko, RSA; Expedition 1 Second spaceflight	(Russia) Talgat Musabayev, RSA; ISS EP-1; Third and last spaceflight
Flight Engineer	(Russia) Sergei Krikalev, RSA; Expedition 1 Fifth spaceflight	(Russia) Yuri Baturin, RSA; ISS EP-1; Second and last spaceflight
Flight Engineer/Spaceflight Participant	(United States) William Shepherd, NASA; Expedition 1 Fourth and last spaceflight	(United States) Dennis Tito, SA; ISS EP-1; Only spaceflight Space Tourist
