= William Shepherd =

American astronaut (born 1949)

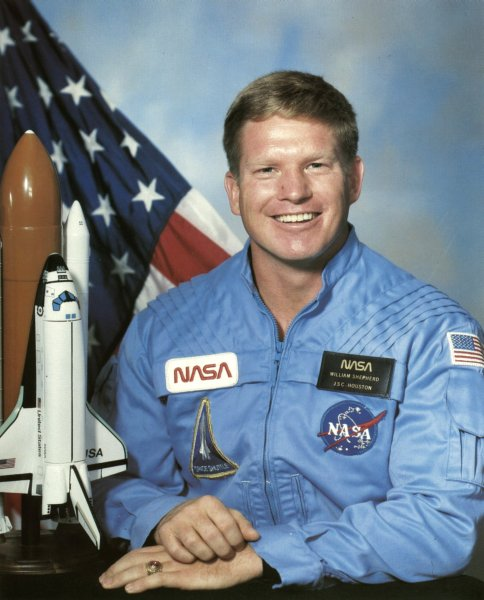
- Born: William McMichael Shepherd; July 26, 1949 (age 77); Oak Ridge, Tennessee, U.S.
- Education: United States Naval Academy (BS); Massachusetts Institute of Technology (Eng, MS)
- Awards: Congressional Space Medal of Honor; Medal "For Merit in Space Exploration"
- Space career

NASA astronaut
- Rank: Captain, USN
- Time in space: 159d 7h 49min
- Selection: NASA Group 10 (1984)
- Missions: STS-27; STS-41; STS-52; Soyuz TM-31/STS-102 (Expedition 1)
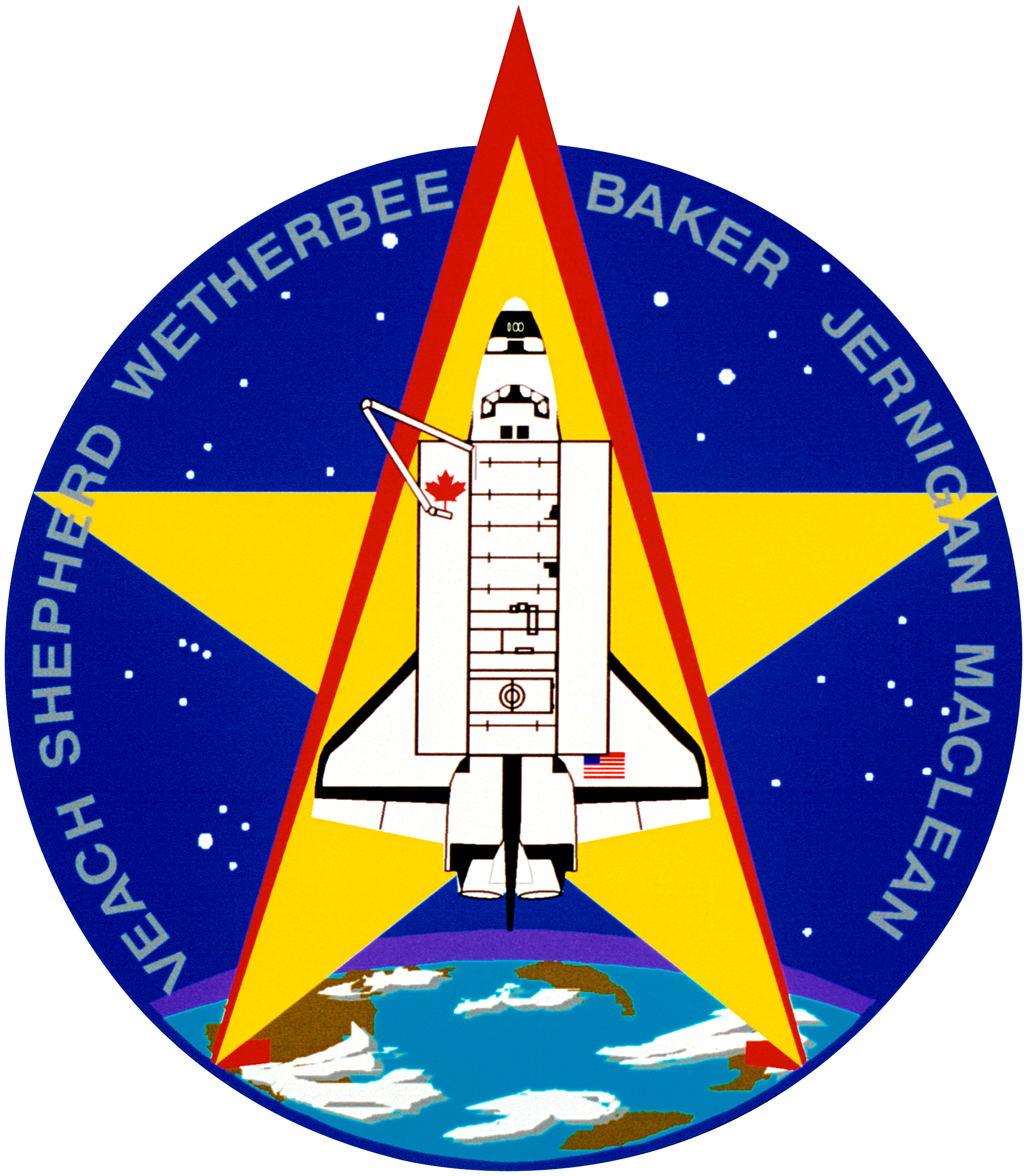
- Mission insignia
- Retired: August 14, 2002

William McMichael Shepherd (born July 26, 1949), (Capt, USN, Ret.), is an American former Navy SEAL, aerospace, ocean, and mechanical engineer, and NASA astronaut, who served as commander of Expedition 1, the first crew on the International Space Station. He is a recipient of the Congressional Space Medal of Honor.

== Education and training ==
Shepherd was born on July 26, 1949, to George R. Shepherd and Barbara Shepherd in Oak Ridge, Tennessee, but he considers Babylon, New York, his hometown. He is married to Beth Stringham of Batavia, New York. He graduated from Arcadia High School in Phoenix, Arizona in 1967, and received a Bachelor of Science degree in Aerospace Engineering from the United States Naval Academy in Annapolis, Maryland in 1971. He completed Basic Underwater Demolition/SEAL (BUD/S) training in 1972, then joined the United States Naval Special Warfare Command and qualified as a Navy SEAL. He served with the Navy's Underwater Demolition Team ELEVEN, SEAL Teams ONE and TWO, and Special Boat Unit TWENTY. He obtained an Engineer's degree in Ocean Engineering and a Master of Science degree in Mechanical Engineering, both in 1978, from the Massachusetts Institute of Technology (MIT).

== NASA career ==
When I was little I used to cut up two-by-fours and make little boats. I'm still in the boat-building business. It's just in orbit.

— William M. Shepherd.

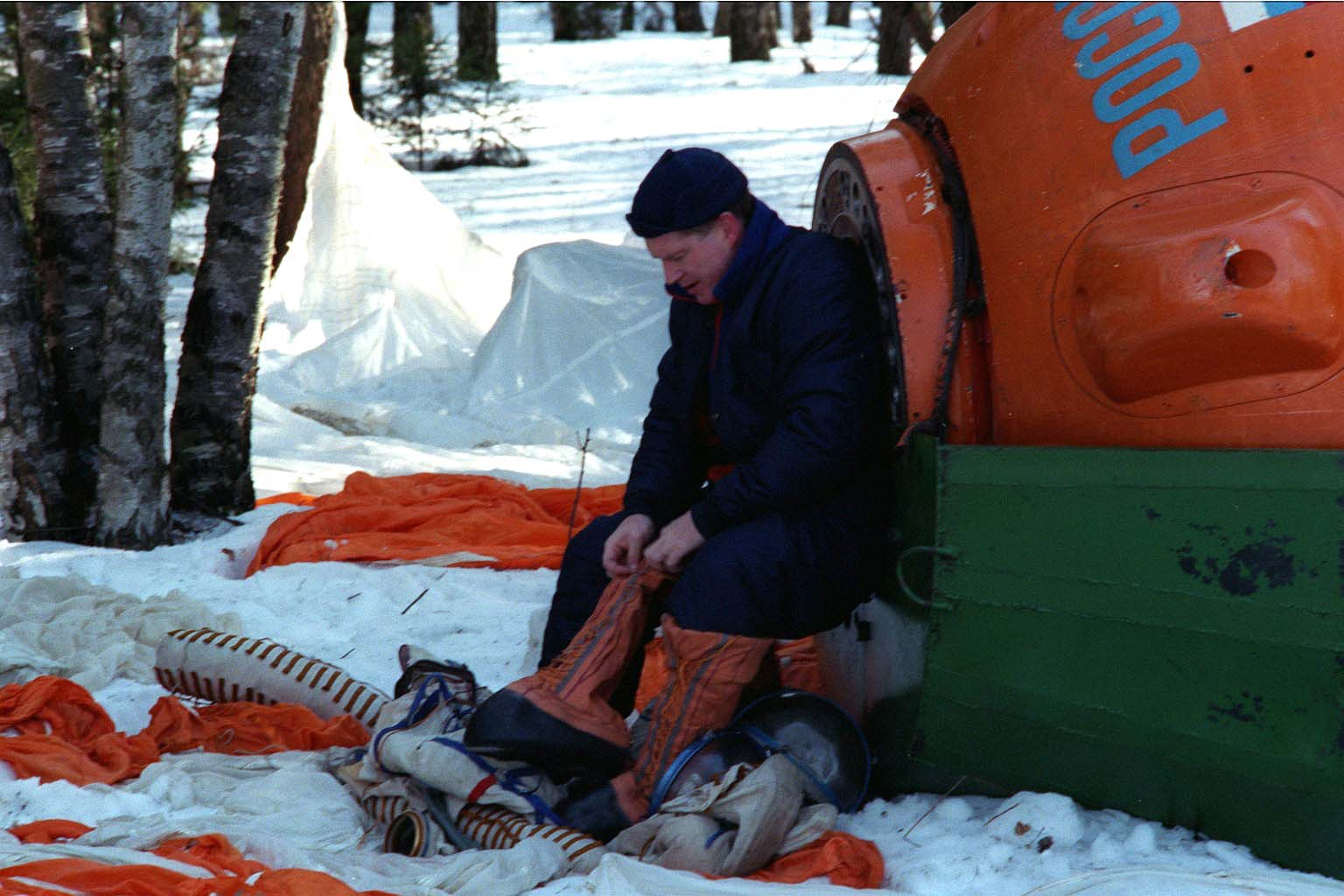
Shepherd during Soyuz winter survival training in March 1998 near Star City, Russia

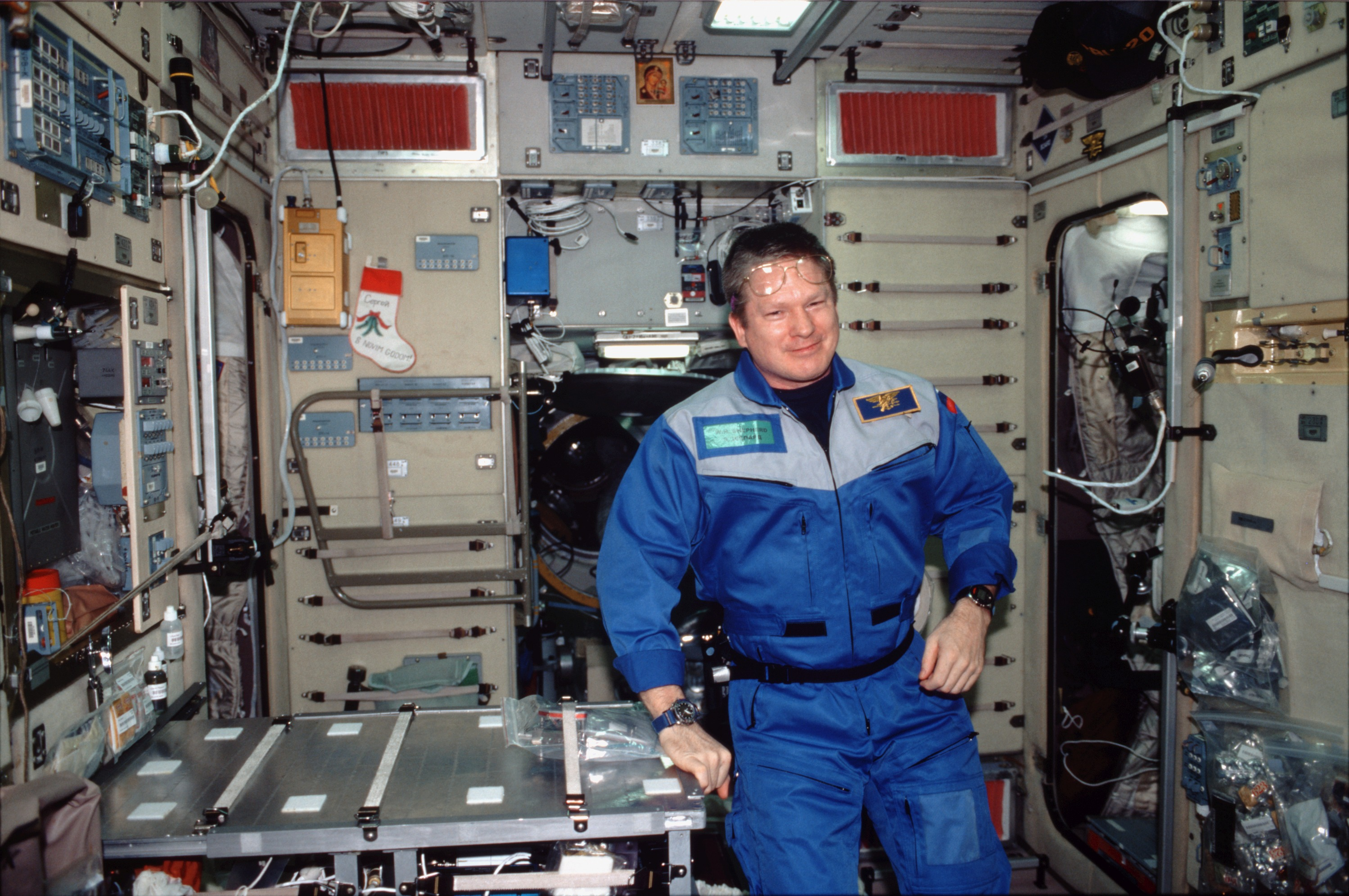
William Shepherd on the ISS as commander of Expedition 1

After Shepherd was selected for NASA Astronaut Group 10 in 1984, rumors spread that he had answered a standard interview question about what he did best by saying, "kill people with knives" but he later refused to confirm or deny the account, commenting "it's too good a story". He was the first military non-aviator in astronaut training, following his unsuccessful application for NASA Astronaut Group 9 in 1980. In 1986, Shepherd's Navy SEAL training proved unexpectedly useful to NASA as he helped to direct the underwater salvage operations of the Space Shuttle Challenger after its destruction. Shepherd then served as a mission specialist on three Space Shuttle flights: mission STS-27 in 1988, mission STS-41 in 1990, which deployed the Ulysses probe, and mission STS-52 in 1992. He was the first member of NASA Astronaut Group 10 to fly a space mission.

From March 1993 to January 1996, he was assigned to the International Space Station Program, serving as Program Manager and Deputy Program Manager. In November 1995 he was selected to command the first crew of the International Space Station (ISS). The mission was supposed to launch in 1997, but a long series of political, financial, and technical problems caused significant delays. Although sixteen nations would participate in the ISS program, Russia, along with the United States would bear the majority of the station's costs.

=== Spaceflight experience ===
STS-27: Atlantis (December 2–6, 1988) Shepherd served with his crewmates on a mission that lasted 105 hours and carried Department of Defense payloads. The mission is noteworthy due to the severe damage Atlantis sustained to its critical heat-resistant tiles during ascent.

STS-41: Discovery (October 6–10, 1990) during 66 orbits of the Earth, the crew aboard the Orbiter successfully deployed the Ulysses, starting it on a four-year journey (via Jupiter) to investigate the polar regions of the Sun.

STS-52: Columbia (October 22 to November 1, 1992) was the 10-day mission deployed the Laser Geodynamic Satellite (LAGEOS), and conducted U.S. microgravity payload experiments.

Expedition 1: From October 31, 2000, to March 21, 2001, he and Russian cosmonauts Yuri Gidzenko and Sergey Krikalev launched from Baikonur on Soyuz TM 31 and served as Expedition 1, the first crew on board ISS. The crew returned to Earth on the Space Shuttle Discovery, STS 102.

Shepherd has logged over 159 days in space.

== Post-NASA career ==
Shepherd was next assigned to the staff of Commander, Naval Special Warfare Command, to assist with the development of new capabilities and programs for the Navy's SEAL and Special Boat units. He retired from the U.S. Navy in January 2002. CAPT Shepherd also served as U.S. Special Operations Command's first Science Advisor from 2008–2011.

== Organizations ==
- American Institute of Aeronautics and Astronautics (AIAA)

== Awards and honors ==
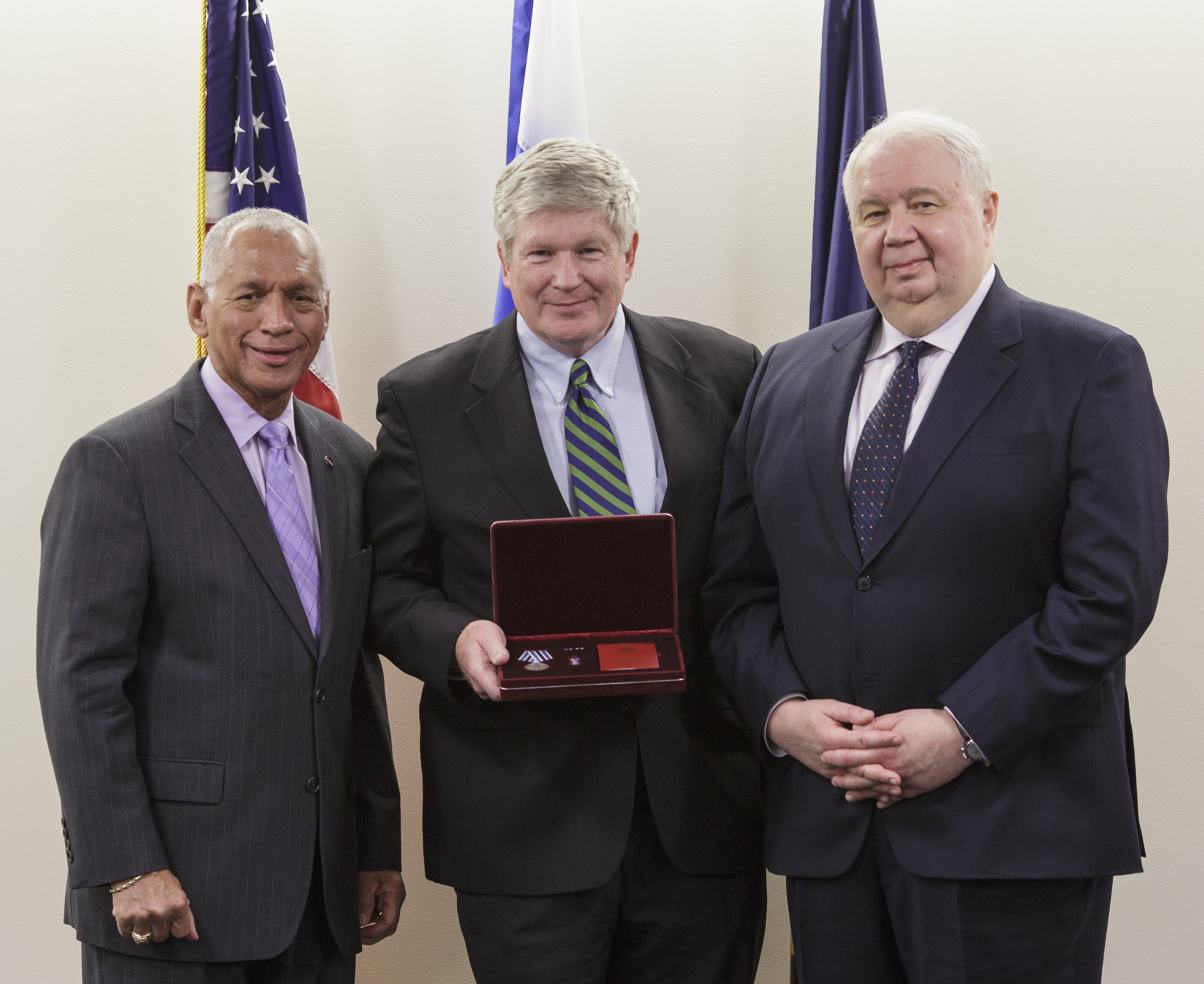
Shepherd, NASA Administrator Charles Bolden and Russian Ambassador Sergey Kislyak after Shepherd was awarded the Russian Medal "For Merit in Space Exploration", December 2, 2016

- Congressional Space Medal of Honor
- NASA's "Steve Thorne" Aviation Award
- 2004 inductee into the International Space Hall of Fame
- 2009 inductee into the U.S. Astronaut Hall of Fame.
- Honorary Naval Aviator
- Fédération Aéronautique Internationale V. M. Komarov Diploma
- Fédération Aéronautique Internationale (FAI) Yuri Gagarin Gold Medal
- Spirit of St Louis Medal
- NDIA Lt. Col. George M. Chinn Award
- Dr. Robert H. Goddard Memorial Trophy
- Medal "For Merit in Space Exploration"
- International Space Station Program, which Capt. Shepherd led both on the ground, and in space, was awarded the 2009 Collier Trophy.
