= Progress M-29 =

Russian cargo spacecraft

- A Progress-M spacecraft
- Mission type: Mir resupply
- COSPAR ID: 1995-053A
- SATCAT no.: 23678

Spacecraft properties
- Spacecraft: Progress (No.229)
- Spacecraft type: Progress-M
- Manufacturer: RKK Energia

Start of mission
- Launch date: 8 October 1995, 18:50:40 UTC
- Rocket: Soyuz-U
- Launch site: Baikonur, Site 1/5

End of mission
- Disposal: Deorbited
- Decay date: 19 December 1995, 16:15 UTC

Orbital parameters
- Reference system: Geocentric
- Regime: Low Earth
- Perigee altitude: 197 km
- Apogee altitude: 242 km
- Inclination: 51.6°
- Period: 88.6 minutes
- Epoch: 8 October 1995

Docking with Mir
- Docking port: Kvant-1 aft
- Docking date: 10 October 1995, 20:32:40 UTC
- Undocking date: 19 December 1995, 09:15:05 UTC

Progress M-29 (Russian: Прогресс M-29) was a Russian unmanned Progress cargo spacecraft, which was launched in October 1995 to resupply the Mir space station.

== Launch ==
Progress M-29 launched on 8 October 1995 from the Baikonur Cosmodrome in Kazakhstan. It used a Soyuz-U rocket.

== Docking ==
Progress M-29 docked with the aft port of the Kvant-1 module of Mir on 10 October 1995 at 20:32:40 UTC, and was undocked on 19 December 1995 at 09:15:05 UTC.

== Decay ==
It remained in orbit until 19 December 1995, when it was deorbited. The deorbit burn occurred at 15:26 UTC and the mission ended at 16:15 UTC.

== See also ==
- 1995 in spaceflight
- List of Progress missions
- List of uncrewed spaceflights to Mir
