= Progress M-30 =

Russian cargo spacecraft

- A Progress-M spacecraft
- Mission type: Mir resupply
- COSPAR ID: 1995-070A
- SATCAT no.: 23744

Spacecraft properties
- Spacecraft: Progress (No.230)
- Spacecraft type: Progress-M
- Manufacturer: RKK Energia

Start of mission
- Launch date: 18 December 1995, 14:31:35 UTC
- Rocket: Soyuz-U
- Launch site: Baikonur, Site 1/5

End of mission
- Disposal: Deorbited
- Decay date: 22 February 1996, 11:02:36 UTC

Orbital parameters
- Reference system: Geocentric
- Regime: Low Earth
- Perigee altitude: 194 km
- Apogee altitude: 316 km
- Inclination: 51.6°
- Period: 89.6 minutes
- Epoch: 18 December 1995

Docking with Mir
- Docking port: Kvant-1 aft
- Docking date: 20 December 1995, 16:10:15 UTC
- Undocking date: 22 February 1996, 07:24:00 UTC

Progress M-30 (Russian: Прогресс M-30) was a Russian unmanned Progress cargo spacecraft, which was launched in December 1995 to resupply the Mir space station.

== Launch ==
Progress M-30 launched on 8 December 1995 from the Baikonur Cosmodrome in Kazakhstan. It used a Soyuz-U rocket.

== Docking ==
Progress M-30 docked with the aft port of the Kvant-1 module of Mir on 20 December 1995 at 16:10:15 UTC, and was undocked on 22 February 1996 at 07:24:00 UTC.

== Decay ==
It remained in orbit until 22 February 1996, when it was deorbited. The deorbit burn occurred at 11:02:36 UTC.

== See also ==
- 1995 in spaceflight
- List of Progress missions
- List of uncrewed spaceflights to Mir
