= List of astronauts by name =

This is an alphabetical list of astronauts, people selected to train for a human spaceflight program to command, pilot, or serve as a crew member of a spacecraft.

For a list of everyone who has flown in space, see List of space travelers by name.

More than 600 people have been trained as astronauts. Until recently, astronauts were sponsored and trained exclusively by governments, either by the military or by civilian space agencies. However, with the advent of suborbital flight starting with privately funded SpaceShipOne in 2004, a new category of astronaut was created: the commercial astronaut.

While the term astronaut is sometimes applied to anyone who trains for travel into space—including scientists, politicians, journalists, and tourists—this article lists only professional astronauts, those who have been selected to train professionally. This includes national space programs, industry and commercial space programs which train and/or hire their own professional astronauts.

The flags indicate the astronaut's primary citizenship during their time as an astronaut. The symbol identifies female astronauts. The symbol △ indicates astronauts who have left low Earth orbit. The symbol ▲ indicates astronauts who have walked on the Moon. The symbol † indicates astronauts who have died in incidents related to a space program.

== A ==
- (United States) Joseph M. Acaba (1967–) — STS-119, Soyuz TMA-04M, Soyuz MS-06
- (United States) Loren Acton (1936–) — STS-51-F
- (United States) Mike Adams (1930–1967) † — Died during X-15 Flight 191 when he lost control and his aircraft broke up.
- (United States) James Adamson (1946–) — STS-28, STS-43
- (Soviet Union) (Russia) Viktor M. Afanasyev — Soyuz TM-11, Soyuz TM-18, Soyuz TM-29, Soyuz TM-33/32
- (Kazakhstan) Aydyn Aimbetov — Soyuz TMA-18M
- (United States) Thomas Akers — STS-41, STS-49, STS-61, STS-79
- (Soviet Union) Vladimir Aksyonov — Soyuz 22, Soyuz T-2
- (United States) Buzz Aldrin △▲ — Gemini 12, Apollo 11. Second person to walk on the Moon.
- (Bulgaria) Aleksandar Panayotov Aleksandrov — Soyuz TM-5
- (Soviet Union) Aleksandr Pavlovich Aleksandrov — Soyuz T-9, Soyuz TM-3
- (Saudi Arabia) Ali AlQarni — Axiom Mission 2
- (United States) Andrew M. Allen — STS-46, STS-62, STS-75
- (United States) Joseph P. Allen — STS-5, STS-51-A
- (United States) Michael Alsbury † — Commercial astronaut, died when the VSS Enterprise broke up during a test flight.
- (United States) Christopher Altman — NASA-trained commercial astronaut, Association of Spaceflight Professionals 2011
- (United States) Scott Altman — STS-90, STS-106, STS-109, STS-125
- (Spain) Pablo Álvarez Fernández — No flights. 2022 ESA Astronaut group.
- (United States) William Anders (1933–2024) △ — Apollo 8
- (United States) Clayton Anderson — STS-117/120, STS-131
- (United States) Michael P. Anderson (1959–2003) † — STS-89. Died in the Space Shuttle Columbia disaster when it disintegrated during re-entry (STS-107).
  - (Claudie André-Deshays – see Claudie Haigneré)
- (United States) Dominic A. Antonelli — STS-119, STS-132
- (United States) Jerome Apt — STS-37, STS-47, STS-59, STS-79
- (United States) Lee Archambault — STS-117, STS-119
- (United States) Neil Armstrong (1930–2012) △▲ — Gemini 8, Apollo 11. First person to walk on the Moon.
- (Iran) (United States) Anousheh Ansari — Soyuz TMA-9
- (United States) Hayley Arceneaux — Inspiration4
- (Russia) Oleg Artemyev — Soyuz TMA-12M, Soyuz MS-08, Soyuz MS-21
- (United States) Richard R. Arnold — STS-119, Soyuz MS-08
- (Soviet Union) Anatoly Artsebarsky — Soyuz TM-12
- (Soviet Union) Yuri Artyukhin (1930–1998) — Soyuz 14
- (United States) Jeffrey Ashby — STS-93, STS-100, STS-112
- (Soviet Union) Oleg Atkov — Soyuz T-10/11
- (Soviet Union) Toktar Aubakirov — Soyuz TM-13/12
- (United States) Serena M. Auñón-Chancellor — Soyuz MS-09, Expedition 56/57
- (Russia) Sergei Avdeyev — Soyuz TM-15, Soyuz TM-22
- (United States) Nichole Ayers — SpaceX Crew-10

== B ==
- (United States) James P. Bagian, M.D. — STS-29, STS-40
- (United States) Ellen S. Baker, M.D. — STS-34, STS-50, STS-71
- (United States) Michael Baker — STS-43, STS-52, STS-68, STS-81
- (Soviet Union) Aleksandr Balandin — Soyuz TM-9
- (United States) Michael R. Barratt, M.D. — Soyuz TMA-14, STS-133, SpaceX Crew-8
- (Saudi Arabia) Rayyanah Barnawi — Axiom Mission 2
- (United States) Kayla Barron— SpaceX Crew-3
- (United States) Daniel Barry — STS-72, STS-96, STS-105
- (United States) John-David F. Bartoe — STS-51-F
- (United States) Charlie Bassett (1931–1966) — No flights. Originally assigned to Gemini 9.
- (Russia) Yuri Baturin — Soyuz TM-28/27, Soyuz TM-32/31
- (France) Patrick Baudry — STS-51-G
- (United States) Alan Bean (1932–2018) △▲ — Apollo 12, Skylab 3
- (United States) Robert L. Behnken — STS-123, STS-130, Crew Dragon Demo-2
- (Slovakia) Ivan Bella — Soyuz TM-29/28
- (Soviet Union) Pavel Belyayev (1925–1970) — Voskhod 2
- (Australia) Katherine Bennell-Pegg — No flights
- (Soviet Union) Georgi Beregovoi (1921–1995) — Soyuz 3
- (Soviet Union) Anatoli Berezovoy (1942–2014) — Soyuz T-5/7
- (United States) Brian Binnie — SpaceShipOne flight 17P
- (United States) John Blaha — STS-29, STS-33, STS-43, STS-58, STS-79/81
- (United States) Michael J. Bloomfield — STS-86, STS-97, STS-110
- (United States) Guion Bluford — STS-8, STS-61-A, STS-39, STS-53
- (United States) Karol Bobko (1937–2023) — STS-6, STS-51-D, STS-51-J
- (United States) Eric A. Boe — STS-126, STS-133
- (United States) Charles Bolden — STS-61-C, STS-31, STS-45, STS-60
- (Canada) Roberta Bondar, M.D. — STS-42
- (Soviet Union) Valentin Bondarenko (1937–1961) † — No flights. Died from a training-related fire accident.
- (Russia) Andrei Borisenko — Soyuz TMA-21, Soyuz MS-02
- (Russia) Konstantin Borisov — SpaceX Crew-7
- (United States) Frank Borman (1928–2023) △ — Gemini 7, Apollo 8
- (United States) Stephen G. Bowen — STS-126, STS-132, STS-133, SpaceX Crew-6
- (United States) Kenneth Bowersox — STS-50, STS-61, STS-73, STS-82, STS-113/Soyuz TMA-1
- (United States) Charles E. Brady Jr., M.D. (1951–2006) — STS-78
- (United States) Vance Brand — Apollo–Soyuz Test Project, STS-5, STS-41-B, STS-35
- (United States) Daniel Brandenstein — STS-8, STS-51-G, STS-32, STS-49
- (United States) Randolph Bresnik — STS-129, Soyuz MS-05
- (United States) Roy Bridges — STS-51-F
- (United States) Curtis Brown — STS-47, STS-66, STS-77, STS-85, STS-95, STS-103
- (United States) David M. Brown (1956–2003) † — Died in the Columbia reentry disintegration (STS-107)
- (United States) Mark Brown — STS-28, STS-48
- (United States) James Buchli — STS-51-C, STS-61-A, STS-29, STS-48
- (United States) Jay C. Buckey, M.D. — STS-90
- (Russia) Nikolai Budarin — STS-71/Soyuz TM-21, Soyuz TM-27, STS-113/Soyuz TMA-1
- (United States) John S. Bull (1934–2008) — No flights.
- (United States) Daniel Burbank — STS-106, STS-115, Soyuz TMA-22
- (United States) Daniel Bursch — STS-51, STS-68, STS-77, STS-108/111
- (Soviet Union) Valery Bykovsky (1934–2019) — Vostok 5, Soyuz 22, Soyuz 31/29

== C ==
- (United States) Robert D. Cabana — STS-41, STS-53, STS-65, STS-88
- (United States) Yvonne Cagle, M.D. — No flights.
- (China) Cai Xuzhe — Shenzhou 14, Shenzhou 19
- (United States) Fernando Caldeiro (1958–2009) — No flights.
- (United States) Charles Camarda — STS-114
- (United States) Kenneth D. Cameron — STS-37, STS-56, STS-74
- (United States) Zena Cardman — SpaceX Crew-11
- (United States) Duane G. Carey — STS-109
- (United States) Scott Carpenter (1925–2013) — Mercury 7
- (United States) Gerald Carr (1932–2020) — Skylab 4
- (United States) Sonny Carter, M.D. (1947–1991) — STS-33
- (United States) John Casper — STS-36, STS-54, STS-62, STS-77
- (United States) Josh Cassada — SpaceX Crew-5
- (United States) Christopher Cassidy — STS-127, Soyuz TMA-08M, Soyuz MS-16
- (United States) Robert J. Cenker — STS-61-C
- (United States) Eugene Cernan (1934–2017) △▲ — Gemini 9A, Apollo 10, Apollo 17
- (United States) Roger B. Chaffee (1935–1967) † — Died in the Apollo 1 fire accident.
- (United States) Gregory Chamitoff — STS-124/126, STS-134
- (Costa Rica) (United States) Franklin Chang-Diaz — STS-61-C, STS-34, STS-46, STS-60, STS-75, STS-91, STS-111
- (Australia) (United States) Philip K. Chapman — No flights.
- (United States) Raja Chari — SpaceX Crew-3
- (India) (United States) Kalpana Chawla (1961–2003) † — STS-87. Died in the Columbia reentry disintegration (STS-107).
- (Italy) Maurizio Cheli — STS-75
- (China) Chen Dong — Shenzhou 11, Shenzhou 14, Shenzhou 20.
- (China) Chen Quan — No flights. Backup for Shenzhou 7.
- (China) Chen Zhongrui — Shenzhou 20
- (United States) Leroy Chiao — STS-65, STS-72, STS-92, Soyuz TMA-5
- (United States) Kevin P. Chilton — STS-49, STS-59, STS-76
- (France) Jean-Loup Chrétien — Soyuz T-6, Soyuz TM-7/6, STS-86
- (Russia) Nikolai Chub — Soyuz MS-24/MS-25
- (United States) Laurel B. Clark, M.D. (1961–2003) † — Died in the Columbia reentry disintegration (STS-107)
- (United States) Mary L. Cleave (1947–2023) — STS-61-B, STS-30
- (France) Jean-François Clervoy, EAC — STS-66, STS-84, STS-103
- (United States) Michael R. Clifford (1952–2021) — STS-53, STS-59, STS-76
- (United States) Michael Coats — STS-41-D, STS-29, STS-39
- (United States) Kenneth Cockrell — STS-56, STS-69, STS-80, STS-98, STS-111
- (United States) Catherine Coleman — STS-73, STS-93, Soyuz TMA-20
- (United States) Eileen Collins — STS-63, STS-84, STS-93, STS-114
- (United States) Michael Collins (1930–2021) △ — Gemini 10, Apollo 11
- (United States) Charles "Pete" Conrad (1930–1999) △▲ — Gemini 5, Gemini 11, Apollo 12, Skylab 2
- (United States) Gordon Cooper (1927–2004) — Mercury 9, Gemini 5
- (United States) Richard O. Covey — STS-51-I, STS-26, STS-38, STS-61
- (United States) Timothy Creamer — Soyuz TMA-17
- (United States) John O. Creighton — STS-51-G, STS-36, STS-48
- (United States) Robert Crippen — STS-1, STS-7, STS-41-C, STS-41-G
- (Italy) Samantha Cristoforetti — Soyuz TMA-15M, SpaceX Crew-4
- (United States) Roger K. Crouch — STS-83, STS-94
- (United States) Frank L. Culbertson Jr. — STS-38, STS-51, STS-105/108
- (United States) Walter Cunningham (1932–2023)— Apollo 7
- (United States) Robert Curbeam — STS-85, STS-98, STS-116
- (United States) Nancy J. Currie — STS-57, STS-70, STS-88, STS-109

== D ==
- (United States) Bill Dana (1930–2014) — X-15 flights 174 and 197
- (United States) Nancy Jan Davis — STS-47, STS-60, STS-85
- (United States) Lawrence J. DeLucas — STS-50
- (Belgium) Frank De Winne — Soyuz TMA-1/TM-34, Soyuz TMA-15
- (China) Deng Qingming — Shenzhou 15
- (Russia) Vladimir N. Dezhurov — Soyuz TM-21/STS-71
- (Soviet Union) Georgi Dobrovolski (1928–1971) † — Died in the Soyuz 11 reentry depressurisation
- (Japan) Takao Doi — STS-87, STS-123
- (United States) Matthew Dominick — SpaceX Crew-8
- (United States) B. Alvin Drew — STS-118, STS-133
- (Russia) Pyotr Dubrov — Soyuz MS-18, Soyuz MS-19
- (United States) Brian Duffy — STS-45, STS-57, STS-72, STS-92
- (United States) Charles Duke △▲ — Apollo 16
- (United States) Bonnie J. Dunbar — STS-61-A, STS-32, STS-50, STS-71, STS-89
- (United States) Alexander Dunlap — APS STS-90
- (Spain) Pedro Duque — STS-95, Soyuz TMA-3/2
- (United States) Samuel T. Durrance (1943–2023) — STS-35, STS-67
- (United States) James Dutton — STS-131
- (Soviet Union) Lev Dyomin (1926–1998) — Soyuz 15
- (United States) Tracy Caldwell Dyson — STS-118, Soyuz TMA-18, Soyuz MS-25
- (Soviet Union) Vladimir Dzhanibekov — Soyuz 27/26, Soyuz 39, Soyuz T-6, Soyuz T-12, Soyuz T-13

== E ==
- (United States) Joe Edwards — STS-89
- (United States) Donn F. Eisele (1930–1987) — Apollo 7
- (United States) Anthony W. England — STS-51-F
- (United States) Joe H. Engle (1932–2024) — X-15 flights 138, 143, and 153, STS-2, STS-51-I
- (United States) Jeanette J. Epps — SpaceX Crew-8
- (United States) Ronald Evans (1933–1990) △ — Apollo 17
- (Germany) Reinhold Ewald — Soyuz TM-25/24
- (France) Léopold Eyharts, EAC — Soyuz TM-27/26, STS-122/123
- (Iran) / (United States) Eiman Jahangir—Sub-orbital spaceflight

== F ==
- (United States) John Fabian — STS-7, STS-51-G
- (Syria) Muhammed Faris — Soyuz TM-3/2
- (Hungary) Bertalan Farkas — Soyuz 36/35
- (France) Jean-Jacques Favier — STS-78
- (Russia) Andrey Fedyaev — SpaceX Crew-6
- (China) Fei Junlong — Shenzhou 6, Shenzhou 15
- (Soviet Union) Konstantin Feoktistov (1926–2009) — Voskhod 1
- (United States) Christopher Ferguson — STS-115, STS-126, STS-135
- (United States) Martin J. Fettman — STS-58
- (United States) Andrew J. Feustel — STS-125, STS-134, Soyuz MS-08
- (Soviet Union) Anatoly Filipchenko — Soyuz 7, Soyuz 16
- (United States) Michael Fincke — Soyuz TMA-4, Soyuz TMA-13, STS-134, SpaceX Crew-11
- (United States) John L. Finley (1935–2006) — No flights. Trained for the MOL program.
- (United States) Jack D. Fischer — Soyuz MS-04
- (United States) Anna Lee Fisher, M.D. — STS-51-A
- (United States) William Frederick Fisher, M.D. — STS-51-I
- (Germany) Klaus-Dietrich Flade — Soyuz TM-14/13
- (United Kingdom) (United States) Michael Foale — STS-45, STS-56, STS-63, STS-84/86, STS-103, Soyuz TMA-3
- (United States) Kevin A. Ford — STS-128, Soyuz TMA-06M
- (United States) Michael Foreman — STS-123, STS-129
- (United States) Patrick Forrester — STS-105, STS-117, STS-128
- (United States) Michael Fossum — STS-121, STS-124, Soyuz TMA-02M
- (United States) Ted Freeman (1930–1964) — No flights
- (United States) Stephen Frick — STS-110, STS-122
- (Belgium) Dirk Frimout — STS-45
- (Sweden) Christer Fuglesang — STS-116, STS-128
- (United States) Gordon Fullerton (1936–2013) — STS-3, STS-51-F
- (Germany) Reinhard Furrer (1940–1995) — STS-61-A
- (Japan) Satoshi Furukawa — Soyuz TMA-02M, SpaceX Crew-7

== G ==
- (United States) F. Drew Gaffney, M.D. — STS-40
- (Soviet Union) Yuri Gagarin (1934–1968)† — Vostok 1. First person in space. Died in a training flight.
- (United States) Ronald Garan — STS-124, Soyuz TMA-21
- (United States) Dale Gardner (1948–2014) — STS-8, STS-51-A
- (United States) Guy Gardner — STS-27, STS-35
- (Spain) Sara García Alonso — No flights. 2022 ESA Astronaut group.
- (Canada) Marc Garneau — STS-41-G, STS-77, STS-97
- (United States) Owen Garriott (1930–2019) — Skylab 3, STS-9
- (United States) Charles Gemar — STS-38, STS-48, STS-62
- (United States) Michael Gernhardt — STS-69, STS-83, STS-94, STS-104
- (Germany) Alexander Gerst — Soyuz TMA-13M, Soyuz MS-09
- (Turkey) Alper Gezeravcı — Axiom Mission 3
- (United States) Edward Gibson — Skylab 4
- (United States) Robert L. Gibson — STS-41-B, STS-61-C, STS-27, STS-47, STS-71
- (Russia) Yuri Gidzenko — Soyuz TM-22, Soyuz TM-31/STS-102, Soyuz TM-34/Soyuz TM-33
- (United States) Sarah Gillis — Polaris Dawn
- (United States) Ed Givens (1930–1967) — No flights. NASA group 5.
- (Soviet Union) Yuri Glazkov (1939–2008) — Soyuz 24
- (United States) John Glenn (1921–2016) — Mercury 6, STS-95
- (United States) Victor Glover △ — SpaceX Crew-1, Artemis II
- (United States) Linda Godwin — STS-37, STS-59, STS-76, STS-108
- (United States) Michael T. Good — STS-125, STS-132
- (Soviet Union) Viktor Gorbatko — Soyuz 7, Soyuz 24, Soyuz 37/36
- (Russia) Aleksandr Gorbunov — SpaceX Crew-9
- (United States) Richard Gordon (1929–2017) △ — Gemini 11, Apollo 12
- (United States) Dominic Gorie — STS-91, STS-99, STS-108, STS-123
- (United States) Ronald Grabe — STS-51-J, STS-30, STS-42, STS-57
- (United States) Duane Graveline, M.D. (1931–2016) — No flights
- (Russia) Alexander Grebenkin — SpaceX Crew-8
- (Soviet Union) Georgi Grechko (1931–2017) — Soyuz 17, Soyuz 26/27, Soyuz T-14/13
- (United States) Frederick Gregory — STS-51-B, STS-33, STS-44
- (United States) William Gregory — STS-67
- (United States) David Griggs (1939–1989) — STS-51-D
- (United States) Virgil I. "Gus" Grissom (1926–1967) † — Mercury-Redstone 4, Gemini 3. Died in the Apollo 1 fire accident.
- (United States) John Grunsfeld — STS-67, STS-81, STS-103, STS-109, STS-125
- (Soviet Union) Aleksei Gubarev — Soyuz 17, Soyuz 28
- (China) Gui Haichao — Shenzhou 16
- (Italy) Umberto Guidoni — STS-75, STS-100
- (Mongolia) Jügderdemidiin Gürragchaa — Soyuz 39
- (United States) Sidney Gutierrez — STS-40, STS-59

== H ==
- (Canada) Chris Hadfield — STS-74, STS-100, Expedition 34, Expedition 35, Soyuz TMA-07M
- (United States) Nick Hague — Soyuz MS-10, Soyuz MS-12, SpaceX Crew-9
- (France) Claudie Haigneré, EAC — Soyuz TM-24/23, Soyuz TM-33/32
- (France) Jean-Pierre Haigneré, EAC — Soyuz TM-17/16, Soyuz TM-29
- (United States) Fred Haise △ — Apollo 13
- (United States) James Halsell — STS-65, STS-74, STS-83, STS-94, STS-101
- (United States) Kenneth Ham — STS-124, STS-132
- (United States) Christina Hammock Koch △ — Soyuz MS-12/Soyuz MS-13 (Expedition 59/60/61), Artemis II. A member of the first all-female EVA team. First female to leave low Earth orbit.
- (United States) Lloyd Hammond — STS-39, STS-64
- (Canada) Jeremy Hansen △ — Artemis II
- (United States) Gregory Harbaugh — STS-39, STS-54, STS-71, STS-82
- (United States) Bernard A. Harris Jr. — STS-55, STS-63
- (United States) Terry Hart — STS-41-C
- (United States) Henry Hartsfield (1933–2014) — STS-4, STS-41-D, STS-61-A
- (United States) Frederick Hauck — STS-7, STS-51-A, STS-26
- (United States) Steven Hawley — STS-41-D, STS-61-C, STS-31, STS-82, STS-93
- (United States) Susan Helms — STS-54, STS-64, STS-78, STS-101, STS-102/105
- (United States) Karl Henize (1926–1993) — STS-51-F
- (United States) Thomas Hennen — STS-44
- (United States) Terence Henricks — STS-44, STS-55, STS-70, STS-78
- (Poland) Mirosław Hermaszewski — Soyuz 30
- (United States) José M. Hernández — STS-128
- (United States) John Herrington — STS-113
- (United States) Richard Hieb — STS-39, STS-49, STS-65
- (United States) Joan Higginbotham — STS-116
- (United States) David Hilmers — STS-51-J, STS-26, STS-36, STS-42
- (United States) Robert Hines — SpaceX Crew-4 (2022)
- (United States) Kathryn Hire — STS-90, STS-130
- (United States) Charles Hobaugh — STS-104, STS-118, STS-129
- (United States) Warren Hoburg — SpaceX Crew-6
- (United States) Jeffrey Hoffman — STS-51-D, STS-35, STS-46, STS-61, STS-75
- (United States) Donald Holmquest, M.D. — No flights
- (United States) Michael S. Hopkins — Soyuz TMA-10M, SpaceX Crew-1
- (United States) Scott Horowitz — STS-75, STS-82, STS-101, STS-105
- (Japan) Akihiko Hoshide — STS-124, Soyuz TMA-05M, SpaceX Crew-2
- (United States) Millie Hughes-Fulford — STS-40
- (United States) Douglas G. Hurley — STS-127, STS-135, Crew Dragon Demo-2
- (United States) Rick Husband (1957–2003) † — STS-96. Died in the Columbia reentry disintegration (STS-107).

== I ==
- (United States) James Irwin (1930–1991) △▲ — Apollo 15
- (Soviet Union) Aleksandr Ivanchenkov — Soyuz 29/31
- (Russia) Anatoli Ivanishin — Soyuz TMA-22, Soyuz MS-01, Soyuz MS-16
- (Bulgaria) Georgi Ivanov — Soyuz 33
- (United States) Marsha Ivins — STS-32, STS-46, STS-62, STS-81, STS-98
- (United States) Jared Isaacman — Inspiration4, Polaris Dawn

== J ==
- (East Germany) Sigmund Jähn (1937–2019) — Soyuz 31/29
- (Canada) Jameel Janjua — Galactic 07
- (United States) Mae Jemison, M.D. — STS-47
- (United States) Tamara E. Jernigan — STS-40, STS-52, STS-67, STS-80, STS-96
- (United States) Brent W. Jett Jr. — STS-72, STS-81, STS-97, STS-115
- (China) Jing Haipeng — Shenzhou 7, Shenzhou 9, Shenzhou 11, Shenzhou 16
- (China) Jiang Xinlin — Shenzhou 17
- (United States) Gregory Jarvis — STS-51-L
- (United States) Gregory C. Johnson — STS-125
- (United States) Gregory H. Johnson — STS-123, STS-134
- (United States) Thomas D. Jones — STS-59, STS-68, STS-80, STS-98
- (Poland) Zenon Jankowski — Soyuz 30 Backup

== K ==
- (Ukraine) Leonid Kadeniuk (1951–2018) — STS-87
- (Russia) Alexander Kaleri — Soyuz TM-14, Soyuz TM-24, Soyuz TM-30, Soyuz TMA-3, Soyuz TMA-01M
- (Japan) Norishige Kanai — Soyuz MS-07
- (United States) Janet L. Kavandi — STS-91, STS-99, STS-104
- (Hungary) Tibor Kapu — Axiom Mission 4
- (United States) James M. Kelly — STS-102, STS-114
- (United States) Mark Kelly — STS-108, STS-121, STS-124, STS-134
- (United States) Scott Kelly — STS-103, STS-118, Soyuz TMA-01M, Soyuz TMA-16M/18M
- (United States) Joseph Kerwin, M.D. — Skylab 2
- (Soviet Union) Yevgeny Khrunov (1933–2000) — Soyuz 5/4
- (Russia) Anna Kikina — SpaceX Crew-5
- (United States) Jonny Kim — Soyuz MS-27
- (United States) Robert S. Kimbrough — STS-126, Soyuz MS-02, SpaceX Crew-2.
- (Soviet Union) Leonid Kizim (1941–2010) — Soyuz T-3, Soyuz T-10/11, Soyuz T-15
- (Soviet Union) Petr Klimuk — Soyuz 13, Soyuz 18, Soyuz 30
- (United States) Pete Knight (1929–2004) — X-15 flight 190
- (United States) Christina Koch — Soyuz MS-12/13, Artemis II
- (Soviet Union) Pyotr Kolodin — No flights, backup for several missions.
- (Soviet Union) Vladimir Komarov (1927–1967) † — Voskhod 1. Died during Soyuz 1 reentry crash.
- (Russia) Yelena Kondakova — Soyuz TM-20/STS-84
- (Russia) Dmitri Kondratyev — Soyuz TMA-20
- (Russia) Oleg Kononenko — Soyuz TMA-12, Soyuz TMA-03M, Soyuz TMA-17M, Soyuz MS-11, Soyuz MS-24/MS-25
- (United States) Timothy L. Kopra — STS-127/128, Soyuz TMA-19M
- (Russia) Mikhail Korniyenko — Soyuz TMA-18, Soyuz TMA-16M/18M
- (Russia) Sergey Korsakov — Soyuz MS-21
- (Russia) Valery Korzun — Soyuz TM-24, STS-111/113
- (Russia) Oleg Kotov — Soyuz TMA-10, Soyuz TMA-17, Soyuz TMA-10M
- (Soviet Union) Vladimir Kovalyonok — Soyuz 25, Soyuz 29/31, Soyuz T-4
- (Russia) Konstantin Kozeyev — Soyuz TM-33/32
- (United States) Kevin Kregel — STS-70, STS-78, STS-87, STS-99
- (Soviet Union) (Russia) Sergei Krikalev — Soyuz TM-7, Soyuz TM-12/Soyuz TM-13, STS-60, STS-88, Soyuz TM-31/STS-102, Soyuz TMA-6
- (Soviet Union) Valeri Kubasov (1935–2019) — Soyuz 6, Soyuz 19, Soyuz 36/35
- (Russia) Sergey Kud-Sverchkov — Soyuz MS-17
- (Netherlands) André Kuipers — Soyuz TMA-4/3, Soyuz TMA-03M
- (United States) Robb Kulin — No flights. Resigned as an astronaut candidate in 2018.

== L ==
- (United States) Kelly Latimer — Galactic 02, Galactic 04, Galactic 05
- (Soviet Union) Aleksandr Laveykin — Soyuz TM-2
- (United States) Robert Lawrence (1935–1967) — No flights. Trained for MOL program.
- (United States) Wendy Lawrence — STS-67, STS-86, STS-91, STS-114
- (Soviet Union) Vasili Lazarev (1928–1990) — Soyuz 12, Soyuz 18a
- (Russia) Aleksandr Lazutkin — Soyuz TM-25
- (Soviet Union) Valentin Lebedev — Soyuz 13, Soyuz T-5/7
- (United States) Mark C. Lee — STS-30, STS-47, STS-64, STS-82
- (United States) David Leestma — STS-41-G, STS-28, STS-45
- (United States) William B. Lenoir (1939–2010) — STS-5
- (Soviet Union) Alexei Leonov (1934–2019) — Voskhod 2, Soyuz 19. First space walk.
- (United States) Frederick W. Leslie — STS-73
- (Soviet Union) Anatoli Levchenko (1941–1988) — Soyuz TM-4/3
- (United States) Byron Lichtenberg — STS-9, STS-45
- (United States) Don Lind — STS-51-B
- (United States) Kjell N. Lindgren — Soyuz TMA-17M, SpaceX Crew-4 (2022)
- (United States) Steven Lindsey — STS-87, STS-95, STS-104, STS-121, STS-133
- (United States) Jerry Linenger — STS-64, STS-81/84
- (China) Song Lingdong — Shenzhou 19
- (United States) Richard Linnehan — STS-78, STS-90, STS-109, STS-123
- (United States) Gregory Linteris — STS-83, STS-94
- (China) Li Cong — Shenzhou 18
- (China) Li Guangsu — Shenzhou 18
- (China) Liu Boming — Shenzhou 7, Shenzhou 12
- (China) Liu Wang — Shenzhou 9
- (China) Liu Yang — Shenzhou 9, Shenzhou 14
  - (Yáng Lìwěi – see Yáng Lìwěi)
- (United States) Anthony Llewellyn — No flights
- (United States) Paul Lockhart — STS-111, STS-113
- (Russia) Yuri Lonchakov — STS-100, Soyuz TMA-1/TM-34, Soyuz TMA-13
- (United States) Michael Lopez-Alegria — STS-73, STS-92, STS-113, Soyuz TMA-9, Axiom Mission 1, Axiom Mission 3
- (United States) Christopher Loria — No flights
- (United States) John Lounge — STS-51-I, STS-26, STS-35
- (United States) Jack Lousma — Skylab 3, STS-3
- (United States) Stanley G. Love — STS-122
- (United States) Jim Lovell △ — Gemini 7, Gemini 12, Apollo 8, Apollo 13
- (United States) G. David Low (1956–2008) — STS-32, STS-43, STS-57
- (United States) Edward Lu — STS-84, STS-106, Soyuz TMA-2
- (United States) Shannon Lucid — STS-51-G, STS-34, STS-43, STS-58, STS-76/79.
- (Soviet Union) Vladimir Lyakhov — Soyuz 32/34, Soyuz T-9, Soyuz TM-6/5

== M ==
- (United Kingdom) David Mackay — VSS Unity VF-01
- (Canada) Steven MacLean — STS-52, STS-115
- (United States) Sandra Magnus — STS-112, STS-126/119, STS-135
- (Soviet Union) Oleg Makarov (1933–2003) — Soyuz 12, Soyuz 18a, Soyuz 27/26, Soyuz T-3
- (Russia) Yuri Malenchenko — Soyuz TM-19, STS-106, Soyuz TMA-2, Soyuz TMA-11, Soyuz TMA-05M, Soyuz TMA-19M
- (Italy) Franco Malerba — STS-46
- Ravish Malhotra — No flights. India's backup cosmonaut for the Intercosmos program.
- (Soviet Union) Yuri Malyshev (1941–1999) — Soyuz T-2, Soyuz T-11/10
- (Soviet Union) (Russia) Gennadi Manakov — Soyuz TM-10, Soyuz TM-16
- (Soviet Union) (Azerbaijan) Musa Manarov — Soyuz TM-4/6, Soyuz TM-11
- (United States) Nicole Aunapu Mann — SpaceX Crew-5
- (United Arab Emirates) Hazza Al Mansouri — Soyuz MS-15/MS-12
- (United States) Thomas Marshburn, M.D. — STS-127, Soyuz TMA-07M, SpaceX Crew-3
- (United States) Michael Massimino — STS-109, STS-125
- (United States) Richard Mastracchio — STS-106, STS-118, STS-131, Soyuz TMA-11M
- (Russia) Denis Matveev — Soyuz MS-21
- (United States) Matthias Maurer — SpaceX Crew-3
- (United States) Michael Masucci — VSS Unity VF-01, Virgin Galactic Unity 22, Virgin Galactic Unity 25, Galactic 01, Galactic 03, Galactic 05
- (United States) Thomas Kenneth "Ken" Mattingly II (1936–2023) △ — Apollo 16, STS-4, STS-51-C.
- (United States) K. Megan McArthur — STS-125, SpaceX Crew-2
- (United States) William S. McArthur — STS-58, STS-74, STS-92, Soyuz TMA-7
- (United States) Christa McAuliffe (1948–1986)† — Died in the Challenger liftoff disintegration
- (United States) Jon McBride — STS-41-G
- (United States) Bruce McCandless II (1937–2017) — STS-41-B, STS-31
- (United States) Anne McClain — Soyuz MS-11, SpaceX Crew-10
- (United States) William C. McCool (1961–2003) † — Died in the Columbia reentry disintegration (STS-107)
- (United States) Michael J. McCulley — STS-34
- (United States) John B. McKay (1922–1975) — X-15 Flight 150 (awarded posthumously). Died from long-term complications of the Flight 74 accident in 1962.
- (United States) James McDivitt (1929–2022) — Gemini 4, Apollo 9
- (United States) Donald McMonagle — STS-39, STS-54, STS-66
- (United States) Ronald McNair (1950–1986) † — STS-41-B. Died in the Challenger liftoff disintegration (STS-51L).
- (United States) Carl Meade — STS-38, STS-50, STS-64
- (United States) Jessica Meir — Soyuz MS-15 (Expedition 61/62). A member of the first all-female EVA team.
- (United States) Bruce Melnick — STS-41, STS-49
- (United States) Pamela Melroy — STS-92, STS-112, STS-120
- (United States) Mike Melvill — SpaceShipOne flight 15P and 16P
- (United States) Leland D. Melvin — STS-122, STS-129
- (Germany) Ulf Merbold — STS-9, STS-42, Soyuz TM-20/19
- (Germany) Ernst Messerschmid — STS-61-A
- (United States) Dorothy M. Metcalf-Lindenburger — STS-131
- (United States) Anna Menon — Polaris Dawn
- (United States) Curt Michel (1934–2015) — No flights
- (Norway) Jannicke Mikkelsen — Fram2
- (Russia) Aleksandr Misurkin — Soyuz TMA-08M, Soyuz MS-06, Soyuz MS-20
- (United States) Edgar Mitchell (1930–2016) △▲ — Apollo 14
- (Denmark) Andreas Mogensen — Soyuz TMA-18M, SpaceX Crew-7
- (United States) Jasmin Moghbeli — SpaceX Crew-7
- (Afghanistan) Abdul Ahad Mohmand — Soyuz TM-6/5
- (Japan) Mamoru Mohri — STS-47, STS-99
- (United States) Andrew R. Morgan — Soyuz MS-13/MS-15
- (United States) Barbara Morgan — STS-118
- (United States) Lee Morin — STS-110
- (Russia) Boris Morukov (1950–2015) — STS-106
- (United States) Beth Moses — VSS Unity VF-01
- (Japan) Chiaki Mukai, M.D. — STS-65, STS-95
- (United States) Richard Mullane — STS-41-D, STS-27, STS-36
- (Soviet Union) (Kazakhstan) Talgat Musabayev — Soyuz TM-19, Soyuz TM-27, Soyuz TM-32/31
- (United States) Story Musgrave, M.D. — STS-6, STS-51-F, STS-33, STS-44, STS-61, STS-80

== N ==
- (United States) Steven R. Nagel (1946–2014) — STS-51-G, STS-61-A, STS-37, STS-55
- (United States) George Nelson — STS-41-C, STS-61-C, STS-26
- (Soviet Union) Grigori Nelyubov (1934–1966) — No flights. Vostok backup.
- (Mexico) Rodolfo Neri Vela — STS-61-B
- (Italy) Paolo A. Nespoli — STS-120, Soyuz TMA-20, Soyuz MS-05
- (United States) James H. Newman — STS-51, STS-69, STS-88, STS-109
- (United Arab Emirates) Sultan Al Neyadi — SpaceX Crew-6
- (Switzerland) Claude Nicollier — STS-46, STS-61, STS-75, STS-103
- (China) Nie Haisheng — Shenzhou 6, Shenzhou 10, Shenzhou 12
- (Soviet Union) Andriyan Nikolayev (1929–2004) — Vostok 3, Soyuz 9
- (Japan) Soichi Noguchi — STS-114, Soyuz TMA-17, SpaceX Crew-1
- (Peru) (United States) Carlos I. Noriega — STS-84, STS-97
- (Russia) Oleg Novitskiy — Soyuz TMA-06M, Soyuz MS-03, Soyuz MS-18, Soyuz MS-25/MS-24
- (United States) Lisa Nowak — STS-121
- (United States) Karen Nyberg — STS-124, Soyuz TMA-09M

== O ==
- (United States) Bryan O'Connor — STS-61-B, STS-40
- (United States) Ellen Ochoa — STS-56, STS-66, STS-96, STS-110
- (Netherlands) Wubbo Ockels (1946–2014) — STS-61-A
- (United States) William Oefelein — STS-116
- (United States) Loral O'Hara — Soyuz MS-24
- (United States) Brian O'Leary (1940–2011) — No flights
- (United States) John D. Olivas — STS-117, STS-128
- (Japan) Takuya Onishi — Soyuz MS-01, Expedition 48/49, SpaceX Crew-10
- (United States) Ellison Onizuka (1946–1986) † — STS-51-C. Died in the Challenger liftoff disintegration (STS-51L).
- (Russia) Yuri Onufrienko — Soyuz TM-23, STS-108/111
- (United States) Stephen Oswald — STS-42, STS-56, STS-67
- (Russia) Aleksey Ovchinin — Soyuz TMA-20M, Soyuz MS-10, Soyuz MS-12, Soyuz MS-26
- (United States) Robert Overmyer (1936–1996) — STS-5, STS-51-B

== P ==
- (Russia) Gennady Padalka — Soyuz TM-28, Soyuz TMA-4, Soyuz TMA-14, Soyuz TMA-04M, Soyuz TMA-16M
- (United States) William Pailes — STS-51-J
- (United States) Scott Parazynski, M.D. — STS-66, STS-86, STS-95, STS-100, STS-120
- (United States) Ronald A. Parise (1951–2008) — STS-35, STS-67
- (United States) Robert Parker — STS-9, STS-35
- (Italy) Luca Parmitano — Soyuz TMA-09M, Soyuz MS-13
- (United Kingdom) (United States) Nicholas Patrick — STS-116, STS-130
- (Soviet Union) Viktor Patsayev (1933–1971) † — Died in the Soyuz 11 reentry depressurisation.
- (United States) James Pawelczyk — STS-90
- (Canada) Julie Payette — STS-96, STS-127
- (United States) Gary Payton — STS-51-C
- (United Kingdom) Timothy Peake — Soyuz TMA-19M
- (Italy) Nicola Pecile -- Galactic 01, Galactic 03, Galactic 06, Galactic 07
- (France) Philippe Perrin, EAC — STS-111
- (Russia) Kirill Peskov — SpaceX Crew-10
- (France) Thomas Pesquet — Soyuz MS-03, SpaceX Crew-2
- (United States) Donald Peterson — STS-6
- (Russia) Dmitry Petelin — Soyuz MS-22/MS-23
- (United States) Donald Pettit — STS-113/Soyuz TMA-1, STS-126, Soyuz TMA-03M, Soyuz MS-26
- (United States) John Phillips — STS-100, Soyuz TMA-6, STS-119
- (Russia) Oleg Platonov — SpaceX Crew-11
- (United States) William Pogue (1930–2014) — Skylab 4
- (United States) Alan G. Poindexter (1961–2012) — STS-122, STS-131
- (United States) Mark Polansky — STS-98, STS-116, STS-127
- (Russia) Alexander Poleshchuk — Soyuz TM-16
- (Soviet Union) (Russia) Valeri Polyakov, M.D. (1942–2022) — Soyuz TM-6/7, Soyuz TM-18/20
- (Brazil) Marcos Pontes — Soyuz TMA-8
- (Soviet Union) Leonid Popov — Soyuz 35/37, Soyuz 40, Soyuz T-7/5
- (Soviet Union) Pavel Popovich (1930–2009) — Vostok 4, Soyuz 14
- (United States) Scott Poteet — Polaris Dawn
- (United States) Charles Precourt — STS-55, STS-71, STS-84, STS-91
- (United States) Sian Proctor — Inspiration4
- (Russia) Sergey Prokopyev — Soyuz MS-09, Soyuz MS-22/MS-23
- (Socialist Republic of Romania) Dumitru Prunariu — Soyuz 40

== R ==
- (Israel) Ilan Ramon (1954–2003)† — Died in the Columbia reentry disintegration (STS-107)
- (United States) William Readdy — STS-42, STS-51, STS-79
- (United States) Kenneth Reightler — STS-48, STS-60
- (United States) James F. Reilly — STS-89, STS-104, STS-117
- (United States) Garrett Reisman — STS-123/124, STS-132
- (Germany) Thomas Reiter — Soyuz TM-22, STS-121/116 Expedition 13
- (Czechoslovakia) Vladimír Remek — Soyuz 28
- (United States) Judith Resnik (1949–1986)† — STS-41D. Died in the Challenger liftoff disintegration (STS-51L)
- (Russia) Sergei Revin — Soyuz TMA-04M
- (United States) Paul W. Richards — STS-102
- (United States) Richard N. Richards — STS-28, STS-41, STS-50, STS-64
- (United States) Sally Ride (1951–2012) — STS-7, STS-41-G. First American woman in space.
- (United States) Patricia Robertson, M.D. (1963–2001) — No flights
- (United States) Stephen Robinson — STS-85, STS-95, STS-114, STS-130
- (United States) Russell L. Rogers (1928–1967) — No flights. Assigned to the Dyna Soar project.
- (Russia) Roman Romanenko — Soyuz TMA-15 Soyuz TMA-07M
- (Soviet Union) Yuri Romanenko — Soyuz 26/27, Soyuz 38, Soyuz TM-2/3
- (United States) Kent Rominger — STS-73, STS-80, STS-85, STS-96, STS-100
- (United States) Stuart Roosa (1933–1994) △ — Apollo 14
- (United States) Jerry L. Ross — STS-61-B, STS-27, STS-37, STS-55, STS-74, STS-88, STS-110
- (Soviet Union) Valery Rozhdestvensky — Soyuz 23
- (United States) Kathleen Rubins — Soyuz MS-01, ISS Expedition 48, Expedition 49, Soyuz MS-17
- (United States) Francisco Rubio — Soyuz MS-22/MS-23
- (Soviet Union) Nikolay Rukavishnikov (1932–2002) — Soyuz 10, Soyuz 16, Soyuz 33
- (United States) Mario Runco Jr. — STS-44, STS-54, STS-77
- (Russia) Sergei Ryazanski — Soyuz TMA-10M, Soyuz MS-05
- (Soviet Union) (Russia) Valery Ryumin (1939–2022) — Soyuz 25, Soyuz 32/34, Soyuz 35/37, STS-91
- (Russia) Sergey Ryzhikov — Soyuz MS-02, Soyuz MS-17, Soyuz MS-27

== S ==
- (United States) Albert Sacco — STS-73
- (Canada) David Saint-Jacques — Soyuz MS-11.
- (Russia) Aleksandr Samokutyayev — Soyuz TMA-21, Soyuz TMA-14M
- (Soviet Union) Gennadi Sarafanov (1942–2005) — Soyuz 15
- (United States) Robert Satcher, M.D. — STS-129
- (Saudi Arabia) Sultan bin Salman bin Abdulaziz Al Saud — STS-51-G
- (Pakistan) Namira Salim — Galactic 04
- (Soviet Union) Viktor Savinykh — Soyuz T-4, Soyuz T-13/14
- (Soviet Union) Svetlana Savitskaya — Soyuz T-7/5, Soyuz T-12
- (United States) Wally Schirra (1923–2007) — Mercury 8, Gemini 6A, Apollo 7
- (Germany) Hans Schlegel — STS-55, STS-122
- (United States) Harrison Schmitt △▲ — Apollo 17
- (United States) Rusty Schweickart — Apollo 9
- (United States) Dick Scobee (1939–1986) † — STS-41-C. Died in the Challenger liftoff disintegration (STS-51L).
- (United States) David Scott △▲ — Gemini 8, Apollo 9, Apollo 15
- (United States) Winston Scott — STS-72, STS-87
- (Australia) (United States) Paul Scully-Power — STS-41-G
- (United States) Richard Searfoss (1956–2018) — STS-58, STS-76, STS-90
- (United States) Rhea Seddon, M.D. — STS-51-D, STS-40, STS-58
- (United States) Elliot See (1927–1966) — No flights
- (United States) Ronald Sega — STS-60, STS-76
- (United Kingdom) (United States) Piers Sellers (1955–2016) — STS-112, STS-121, STS-132
- (United States) Christopher Sembroski — Inspiration4
- (Soviet Union) (Russia) Aleksandr Serebrov (1944–2013) — Soyuz T-7/5, Soyuz T-8, Soyuz TM-8, Soyuz TM-17
- (Russia) Yelena Serova — Soyuz TMA-14M
- (Soviet Union) Vitali Sevastyanov (1935–2010) — Soyuz 9, Soyuz 18
- (United States) Doug Shane — Commercial astronaut, SpaceShipOne 2003
- (Russia) Yuri Shargin — Soyuz TMA-5/4
- (Russia) Salizhan Sharipov — STS-89, Soyuz TMA-5
- (India) Rakesh Sharma — Soyuz T-11/10
- (United Kingdom) Helen Sharman — Soyuz TM-12, Soyuz TM-11
- (Soviet Union) Vladimir Shatalov (1927–2021) — Soyuz 4, Soyuz 8, Soyuz 10
- (United States) Brewster Shaw — STS-9, STS-61-B, STS-28
- (United States) Alan Shepard △▲ (1923–1998) — Mercury-Redstone 3, Apollo 14. First American in space.
- (United States) William Shepherd — STS-27, STS-41, STS-52, Soyuz TM-31/STS-102
  - (Nancy Sherlock – see Nancy Currie)
- (Russia) Anton Shkaplerov — Soyuz TMA-22, Soyuz TMA-15M, Soyuz MS-07, Soyuz MS-19
- (Soviet Union) Georgi Shonin (1935–1997) — Soyuz 6
- (United States) Loren Shriver — STS-51-C, STS-31, STS-46
- (India) Shubhanshu Shukla — Axiom Mission 4 (Ax-4)
- (Malaysia) Sheikh Muszaphar Shukor, M.D. — Soyuz TMA-11/10
- (United States) Peter Siebold — Commercial astronaut, SpaceShipOne 2003
- (Russia) Oleg Skripochka — Soyuz TMA-01M, Soyuz TMA-20M, Soyuz MS-15
- (Russia) Aleksandr Skvortsov — Soyuz TMA-18, Soyuz TMA-12M, Soyuz MS-13
- (United States) Donald "Deke" Slayton (1924–1993) — Apollo–Soyuz Test Project
- (United States) Michael J. Smith (1945–1986) † — Died in the Challenger liftoff disintegration (STS-51L)
- (United States) Steven Smith — STS-68, STS-82, STS-103, STS-110
- (Soviet Union) (Russia) Anatoly Solovyev — Soyuz TM-5/4, Soyuz TM-9, Soyuz TM-15, STS-71/Soyuz TM-21, Soyuz TM-26
- (Soviet Union) Vladimir Solovyov — Soyuz T-10/11, Soyuz T-15
- (United States) Sherwood Spring — STS-61-B
- (United States) Robert Springer — STS-29, STS-38
- (United States) Thomas Patten Stafford △ — Gemini 6A, Gemini 9A, Apollo 10, Apollo–Soyuz Test Project
- (United States) Heidemarie Stefanyshyn-Piper — STS-115, STS-126
- (United States) Robert Stewart — STS-41-B, STS-51-J
- (Israel) Eytan Stibbe — Axiom Mission 1
- (United States) Susan Still Kilrain — STS-83, STS-94
- (United States) Nicole Marie Passonno Stott — STS-128, STS-133
- (Bulgaria) Krasimir Stoyanov-Soyuz TM-5 — No flights.
- (Soviet Union) (Russia) Gennady Strekalov (1940–2004) — Soyuz T-3, Soyuz T-8, Soyuz T-11/10, Soyuz TM-10, Soyuz TM-21/STS-71
- (United States) Mark Stucky — VSS Unity VP-03
- (United States) Frederick Sturckow — STS-88, STS-105, STS-117, STS-128, VSSUnity VP-03, Unity 21, Unity 25, Galactic 02, Galactic 04, Galactic 06
- (United States) Kathryn Sullivan, — STS-41-G, STS-31, STS-45
- (Russia) Maksim Surayev — Soyuz TMA-16, Soyuz TMA-13M
- (United States) Steven Swanson — STS-117, STS-119, Soyuz TMA-12M
- (United States) John "Jack" Swigert (1931–1982) △ — Apollo 13

== T ==
- (Cuba) Arnaldo Tamayo Méndez — Soyuz 38
- (Japan) Akiyama Toyohiro — Soyuz TM-11
- (United States) Daniel Tani — STS-108, STS-120/122
- (United States) Joseph Tanner — STS-66, STS-82, STS-97, STS-115
- (Russia) Evgeny Tarelkin — Soyuz TMA-06M
- (United States) James M. Taylor (1930–1970) — No flights. Assigned to MOL project.
- (Soviet Union) Valentina Tereshkova — Vostok 6. First woman in space.
- (United States) Norman Thagard, M.D. — STS-7, STS-51-B, STS-30, STS-42, Soyuz TM-21/STS-71
- (Germany) Gerhard Thiele — STS-99
- (Canada) Robert Thirsk, M.D. — STS-78, Soyuz TMA-15
- (Australia) (United States) Andrew Thomas — STS-77, STS-89/91, STS-102, STS-114
- (United States) Donald Thomas — STS-65, STS-70, STS-83, STS-94
- (United States) Stephen Thorne (1953–1986) — No flights. Died in a stunt plane accident before completing training.
- (United States) Kathryn Thornton — STS-33, STS-49, STS-61, STS-73
- (United States) William E. Thornton, M.D. (1929–2021) — STS-8, STS-51-B
- (United States) Pierre Thuot — STS-36, STS-49, STS-62
- (Soviet Union) Gherman Titov (1935–2000) — Vostok 2
- (Soviet Union) (Russia) Vladimir Titov — Soyuz T-8, Soyuz TM-4/6, STS-63, STS-86
- (China) Tang Hongbo — Shenzhou 12, Shenzhou 17
- (China) Tang Shengjie — Shenzhou 17
- (United States) Scott D. Tingle — Soyuz MS-07
- (France) Michel Tognini, EAC — Soyuz TM-15/14, STS-93
- (Russia) Valery Tokarev — STS-96, Soyuz TMA-7
- (Russia) Sergei Treshchov — STS-111/113
- (United States) Eugene Trinh — STS-50
- (United States) Richard Truly (1937–2024) — STS-2, STS-8
- (Iceland) (Canada) Bjarni Tryggvason (1945–2022) — STS-85
- (Russia) Vasili Tsibliyev — Soyuz TM-17, Soyuz TM-25
- (Vietnam) Phạm Tuân — Soyuz 37/36
- (Russia) Mikhail Tyurin — STS-105/108, Soyuz TMA-9, Soyuz TMA-11M

== U ==
- (Russia) Yuri Usachov — Soyuz TM-18, Soyuz TM-23, STS-101, STS-102/STS-105
- (Poland) Sławosz Uznański-Wiśniewski — Axiom Mission 4

== V ==
- (Netherlands) (United States) Lodewijk van den Berg (1932–2022) — STS-51-B
- (United States) James "Ox" van Hoften — STS-41-C, STS-51-I
- (United States) Mark Vande Hei — Soyuz MS-06, Soyuz MS-18, Soyuz MS-19
- (Russia) Ivan Vagner — Soyuz MS-16, Soyuz MS-26
- (Soviet Union) Vladimir Vasyutin (1952–2002) — Soyuz T-14
- (United States) Charles Veach (1944–1995) — STS-39, STS-52
- (Austria) Franz Viehböck — Soyuz TM-13/12
- (Soviet Union) (Russia) Alexander Viktorenko — Soyuz TM-3/2, Soyuz TM-8, Soyuz TM-14, Soyuz TM-20
- (Russia) Pavel Vinogradov — Soyuz TM-26, Soyuz TMA-8, Soyuz TMA-08M
- (United States) Terry Virts — STS-130, Soyuz TMA-15M
- (Italy) Roberto Vittori — Soyuz 34/33, Soyuz TMA-6/5, STS-134
- (Soviet Union) Igor Volk — Soyuz T-12
- (Soviet Union) (Russia) Alexander Volkov — Soyuz T-14, Soyuz TM-7, Soyuz TM-13
- (Russia) Sergey Volkov — Soyuz TMA-12, Soyuz TMA-02M, Soyuz TMA-18M
- (Soviet Union) Vladislav Volkov (1935–1971) † — Soyuz 7. Died in the Soyuz 11 reentry depressurisation.
- (Soviet Union) Boris Volynov — Soyuz 5, Soyuz 21
- (United States) James Voss — STS-44, STS-53, STS-69, STS-101, STS-102/105
- (United States) Janice Voss (1956–2012) — STS-57, STS-63, STS-83, STS-94, STS-99

== W ==
- (Japan) Koichi Wakata — STS-72, STS-92, STS-119/127, Soyuz TMA-11M, SpaceX Crew-5
- (United States) Rex Walheim — STS-110, STS-122, STS-135
- (United States) Charles D. Walker — STS-41-D, STS-51-D, STS-61-B
- (United States) David M. Walker (1944–2001) — STS-51-A, STS-30, STS-53, STS-69
- (United States) Joseph A. Walker (1921–1966) — X-15 flights 77, 90, 91
- (United States) Shannon Walker — Soyuz TMA-19, SpaceX Crew-1
- (Germany) Ulrich Walter — STS-55
- (Italy) Walter Villadei — Axiom Mission 3
- (United States) Carl Walz — STS-51, STS-65, STS-79, STS-108/111
- (Sweden) / (Norway) Marcus Wandt — Axiom Mission 3; fastest-trained astronaut in history after selection to fly into orbit
- (China) Wang Haoze — Shenzhou 19
- (China) Wang Jie — Shenzhou 20
- (United States) Taylor Wang — STS-51-B
- (China) Wang Yaping — Shenzhou 10, Shenzhou 13
- (United States) Jessica Watkins — SpaceX Crew-4 (2022)
- (United States) Mary Weber — STS-70, STS-101
- (United States) Paul Weitz (1932–2017) — Skylab 2, STS-6
- (United States) James Wetherbee — STS-32, STS-52, STS-63, STS-86, STS-102, STS-113
- (United States) Douglas Wheelock — STS-120, Soyuz TMA-19
- (United States) Ed White (1930–1967) † — Gemini 4. Died in the Apollo 1 fire accident.
- (United States) Robert Michael White (1924–2010) — X-15 flight 62
- (United States) Peggy Whitson — STS-111/113, Soyuz TMA-11, Soyuz MS-03/MS-04, Axiom Mission 2, Axiom mission 4
- (United States) Terrence Wilcutt — STS-68, STS-79, STS-89, STS-106
- (United States) Clifton "C.C." Williams (1932–1967) † — No flights. Died in a plane crash during training.
- (Canada) Dafydd Williams, M.D. — STS-90, STS-118
- (United States) Donald Williams (1942–2016) — STS-51-D, STS-34
- (United States) Jeffrey Williams — STS-101, Soyuz TMA-8, Soyuz TMA-16, Soyuz TMA-20M
- (United States) Sunita "Suni" Williams — STS-116/117, Soyuz TMA-05M, Boeing CFT/SpaceX Crew-9
- (United States) Barry Wilmore — STS-129, Soyuz TMA-14M, Boeing CFT/SpaceX Crew-9
- (United States) Stephanie Wilson — STS-121, STS-120, STS-131
- (United States) Reid Wiseman △ — Soyuz TMA-13M, Artemis II
- (United States) Peter Wisoff — STS-57, STS-68, STS-81, STS-92
- (United States) David Wolf, M.D. — STS-58, STS-86/89, STS-112, STS-127
- (United States) Neil Woodward — No flights
- (United States) Alfred Worden (1932–2020) △ — Apollo 15

== Y ==
- (Japan) Naoko Yamazaki — STS-131
- (China) Yang Liwei — Shenzhou 5
- (China) Ye Guangfu — Shenzhou 13, Shenzhou 18
- (Soviet Union) Boris Yegorov, M.D. (1937–1994) — Voskhod 1
- (Soviet Union) Aleksei Yeliseyev — Soyuz 5/4, Soyuz 8, Soyuz 10
- (South Korea) Yi So-yeon — Soyuz TMA-12/11
- (United States) John Young (1930–2018) △▲ — Gemini 3, Gemini 10, Apollo 10, Apollo 16, STS-1, STS-9
- (Japan) Kimiya Yui — Soyuz TMA-17M, SpaceX Crew-11
- (Russia) Fyodor Yurchikhin — STS-112, Soyuz TMA-10, Soyuz TMA-19, Soyuz TMA-09M, Soyuz MS-04

== Z ==
- (Russia) Sergei Zalyotin — Soyuz TM-30, Soyuz TMA-1/TM-34
- (United States) George D. Zamka — STS-120, STS-130
- (China) Zhai Zhigang — Shenzhou 7, Shenzhou 13
- (China) Zhang Lu — Shenzhou 15
- (China) Zhang Xiaoguang — Shenzhou 10
- (Soviet Union) Vitaliy Zholobov — Soyuz 21
- (China) Zhu Yangzhu — Shenzhou 16
- (Russia) Alexey Zubritsky — Soyuz MS-27
- (Soviet Union) Vyacheslav Zudov — Soyuz 23

== See also ==
- Astronaut fatalities
- List of space travelers by nationality
- List of Apollo astronauts
- List of cosmonauts
- List of human spaceflights
- List of female astronauts
- List of Muslim astronauts
- List of United States Marine Corps astronauts
- List of Asian American astronauts
- List of Hispanic astronauts
- List of African-American astronauts
- NASA Astronaut Corps
- Space Shuttle crews
- Spaceflight records
- Timeline of space travel by nationality
