= Soyuz 32 =

1979 Soviet crewed spaceflight to Salyut 6

- Operator: Soviet space program
- COSPAR ID: 1979-018A
- SATCAT no.: 11281
- Mission duration: Capsule: 108 days, 4 hours and 24 minutes Original crew: 175 days, 35 minutes

Spacecraft properties
- Spacecraft type: Soyuz 7K-T
- Manufacturer: NPO Energia
- Launch mass: 6,800 kg (15,000 lb)

Crew
- Crew size: 2 up 0 down
- Launching: Vladimir Lyakhov; Valery Ryumin
- Callsign: Протон (Proton - "Proton"

Start of mission
- Launch date: February 25, 1979, 11:53:49 UTC
- Rocket: Soyuz-U
- Launch site: Baikonur 1/5

End of mission
- Landing date: June 13, 1979, 16:18:26 UTC
- Landing site: 170 km (110 mi) SE of Dzhezkazgan

Orbital parameters
- Reference system: Geocentric
- Regime: Low Earth
- Perigee altitude: 198.4 km (123.3 mi)
- Apogee altitude: 274.3 km (170.4 mi)
- Inclination: 51.59°

Docking with Salyut 6
- Docking date: February 26, 1979, 13:29:55 UTC
- Undocking date: June 13, 1979, 09:51 UTC
- Time docked: 106 days, 20 hours and 21 minutes
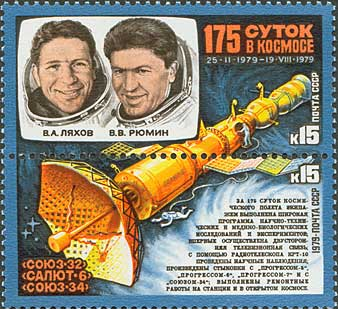
- Soviet postage stamp featuring Lyakhov and Ryumin (1979) Soyuz programme

Soyuz 32 (Russian: Союз 32, Union 32) was a 1979 Soviet crewed space flight to the Salyut 6 space station. It was the eighth mission to and seventh successful docking at the orbiting facility. The Soyuz 32 crew was the third long-duration crew to man the space station.

Cosmonauts Vladimir Lyakhov and Valery Ryumin spent 175 days in space, setting a new space endurance record. Because of the failure of a visiting crew (Soyuz 33) to successfully dock and the resultant decision to send an uncrewed Soyuz craft (Soyuz 34) as a replacement return vehicle, the Soyuz 32 crew had no visitors in the Salyut 6 space station.

== Crew ==
Prime crew
Position	Launching cosmonaut	Landing cosmonaut
Commander	Vladimir Lyakhov; First spaceflight	None
Flight engineer	Valery Ryumin; Second spaceflight	None

Backup crew
Position	Cosmonaut
Commander	Leonid Popov
Flight engineer	Valentin Lebedev

== Mission parameters ==
- Mass: 6,800 kg (15,000 lb)
- Perigee: 198.4 km (123.3 mi)
- Apogee: 274.3 km (170.4 mi)
- Inclination: 51.61°
- Period: 89.94 minutes

== Mission highlights ==
=== Launch and station activation ===
Soyuz 32 was launched with its two-man crew on 25 February 1979. The crew's main mission was to overhaul the Salyut 6 space station's systems and prepare it for further long-duration crews. They would also attempt a new record duration flight. Soyuz 32 docked with Salyut 6 the next day, and Lyakhov and Ryumin, the third long-duration crew at the station, commenced de-mothballing the facility which had been vacant since November. When the hatch to the station was opened, the cosmonauts smelled burnt steel, a scent Ryumin called the odor of space.

The crew started routine activities and two types of medical exams. The first included daily checks of mood, their accomplishments and food intake. The second checked their psychological condition via observing their frequent communication sessions. Their cardiovascular systems were checked every 8 to 10 days, and their body masses measured. By the second week, they exercised 2.5 hours a day, averaged 3,100 calories of daily food intake with 2.5 litres of water.

The orbit of the station was raised by the Soyuz craft's propulsion system 1 March. What the Soviets did not then report was that the Salyut station's propulsion system was having problems.

Experiments included hatching quail eggs, but the chicks grew much slower than on Earth, and lacked heads. A videotape recorder was fixed 6 March using a soldering iron, the first time such repair equipment had been used in space.

=== Progress 5 arrives ===
Progress 5, an uncrewed supply tanker, was launched 12 March and docked with the station two days later. The crew spent four days unloading the vehicle. Supplies delivered included parts for station repair, an extra storage battery, a television monitor, a new Kristall furnace to replace the old one which had broken, a gamma ray telescope and food. A total of 300 items weighing 1,300 kg were delivered. The tanker also delivered 1,000 kg of propellant for the station.

The Soviets revealed the propulsion problem on 16 March. They said a Salyut fuel tank was leaking fuel into the nitrogen bellows which pressurized the fuel. The station's engine systems were not affected, but valves and regulators in the pressurization system were at potential risk. Accordingly, the crew shut down the tank and used a reserve tank. The crew attempted to drain the leaking tank by rotating the station and succeeded by 23 March, purged the tank with nitrogen and closed it off.

On the same day they cleared the tank, the crew used the station's shower for the first time, wearing scuba masks to keep the water out of their eyes.

A milestone was reached 24 March when the cosmonauts installed a television monitor which allowed a two-way television link with ground control. For the first time, cosmonauts received television pictures in space. Seeing family, instead of just hearing them, was considered to have great psychological importance, especially as longer flights were contemplated.

On 30 March, Progress 5 boosted the station's orbit, then Soyuz 32 boosted the orbit again 6 April in preparation for the forthcoming Soyuz 33 crew. Progress 5 was undocked 3 April and deorbited two days later.

=== Soyuz 33 mission failure ===
Soyuz 33 was launched 10 April with the fourth international crew in the Soviet Intercosmos program. Bulgarian cosmonaut Georgi Ivanov joined commander Nikolai Rukavishnikov as the craft proceeded normally towards the space station. But, as the craft approached to 1,000 metres, the engine failed and shut down after three seconds of a planned six-second burn. Rukavishnikov had to hold the instrument panel as the craft violently shook. A second firing attempt was made, but the engine shut down again, and Ryumin, observing from the station, reported an abnormal lateral glow from behind the Soyuz during the burn. Mission control accordingly aborted the mission and told the crew to prepare to return to Earth. It was the first in-orbit failure of the Soyuz propulsion system.

It was only in 1983 that the Soviets revealed how serious the situation was. The craft had a back-up engine but it was feared that it may have been damaged by the main engine, potentially leaving the crew stranded with five days of supplies while it would take ten days for the orbit to decay. The station could have been moved to within 1,000 m of the craft, but the two craft were drifting apart at 28 metres per second, and time was needed to calculate the manoeuvres. In any event, four crew on the station with one malfunctioning Soyuz and a second Soyuz (Soyuz 32) with a now-questionable engine (it had the same type as Soyuz 33) was not considered the best option.

In the end, the backup engine did fire, though for 25 seconds too long, resulting in an unusually steep trajectory and loads of 10 Gs to be endured by the crew. Rukavishnikov and Ivanov were safely recovered.

=== Progress 6, uncrewed Soyuz launched ===
The failure of a prestigious international mission was an embarrassment to Soviet authorities and also had a negative effect on the morale of Ryumin and Lyhakov, both of whom had been looking forward to receiving visitors. News of the cancellation of the Soyuz 33 flight was greeted by a series of grunts followed by the termination of all voice communication by the Salyut 6 crew. Their bad mood persisted for several days. After the Soyuz 33 failure, the station crew were stuck with a suspect craft. The Soyuz 33 craft was intended to be swapped for the Soyuz 32, but the failure called into question the reliability of Soyuz 32's main engine. Until the design was corrected and a new vehicle launched, the crew was safe on Salyut with the Soyuz usable in an emergency. The fifth international flight, scheduled for 5 June, was postponed.

Lyakhov and Ryumin continued their station activities, including experiments intended to be carried out with the visiting crew (which had been delivered aboard the Progress 5 flight), such as one called Pirin which investigated the formation of metal whiskers on zinc crystals, and another which made multi-spectral measurements of the daylight atmosphere. They were given five days off for the May Day holiday.

Progress 6 was launched 13 May and delivered some 100 items. The Soyuz 33 engine failure did not affect the supply tanker as it differed in its design. Unloading took two days, a new navigational unit was installed, and the tanker raised the station's orbit on 22 May. Refueling was completed by 28 May, more orbital adjustments were made 4 and 5 June, and Progress 6 was undocked 8 June.

Soyuz 34, launched uncrewed on 6 June, docked at the just-vacated aft port of the space station on 9 June. The Soyuz had a new engine system, and its successful test flight gave the Salyut 6 crew a reliable return vehicle. Since the craft was uncrewed, some biological samples for experiments were included on the flight.

Soyuz 32 was loaded with 130 kg of replaced instruments, processed materials, exposed film and other items with a total weight equal to that of the two cosmonauts. On 13 June, it undocked and returned to Earth uncrewed 295 km northwest of Dzhezkazgan. The next day, the crew redocked Soyuz 34 at the forward port to clear the aft port for Progress 7.

=== Progress 7, radio telescope deployed, return to Earth ===
External images
- 10-metre diameter KRT-10 radio telescope
- http://www.spacefacts.de/graph/photo/photos2/soyuz-32_krt-10.jpg
- http://scifiart.narod.ru/Albums/6/Picts/6_146.jpg

Progress 7 was launched 28 June and docked at Salyut 6 two days later. It carried 1,230 kg of supplies including food, plants, mail and a 10-metre diameter radio telescope. The station's orbit was raised 3 and 4 July to a 399–411 km orbit, the highest at which a Salyut had operated. This was because no more Progress flights were planned for 1979 and the Salyut's propulsion system was suspect, so the decision was to raise the station's orbit as high as possible before the crew returned to Earth. Propellant was transferred by 17 July. When the Progress craft undocked, the wire mesh parabolic telescope was unfurled. A camera aboard the tanker beamed the scene to Earth.

The KRT-10 radio telescope was deployed out of the rear docking port, but results proved disappointing and the cosmonauts ejected it on August 9. Trouble happened again when the antenna became snared on the port, forcing the tired cosmonauts to perform an unscheduled space walk on 15 August to cut it loose. Ryumin, attached to a tether, used hand rails to get to the antenna and cut it away. Then he and Lyakhov retrieved a materials experiment left on the station's exterior. Because the space walk was so late in the mission, the crew was apprehensive as they were not in the best physical condition to carry it out, so they left letters in the Soyuz return vehicle in case they did not survive.

They packed several experiments in Soyuz 34 and departed the space station 19 August, reentering two days later and landing 170 km southeast of Dzhezkazgan. Because the cosmonauts were so weakened from six months in zero gravity (a bouquet of flowers presented to them reportedly felt like "a ton of bricks"), a system of slides and chutes had to be deployed for them to exit the Soyuz descent module. Lyakhov lost 5.5 kg during the flight (Ryumin's weight was the same) and both experienced a 20% reduction in lower leg volume. They recovered in seven days, several days faster than expected.

The mission had lasted 175 days, a new endurance record surpassing the 139-day mission by the Soyuz 29 crew in 1978.

== Legacy ==
Years later, a similar scenario of crew return was required in 2022. As Soyuz MS-22 was unable to perform crew return due a coolant leak in external radiator, it returned uncrewed with cargo instead of crew like Soyuz 32, and Soyuz MS-23 was launched unmanned with cargo like Soyuz 34 as a replacement to return the crew.

== See also ==
- Soyuz MS-22
- Soyuz MS-23
