= Soyuz MS-23 =

2023 Russian uncrewed spaceflight to the ISS

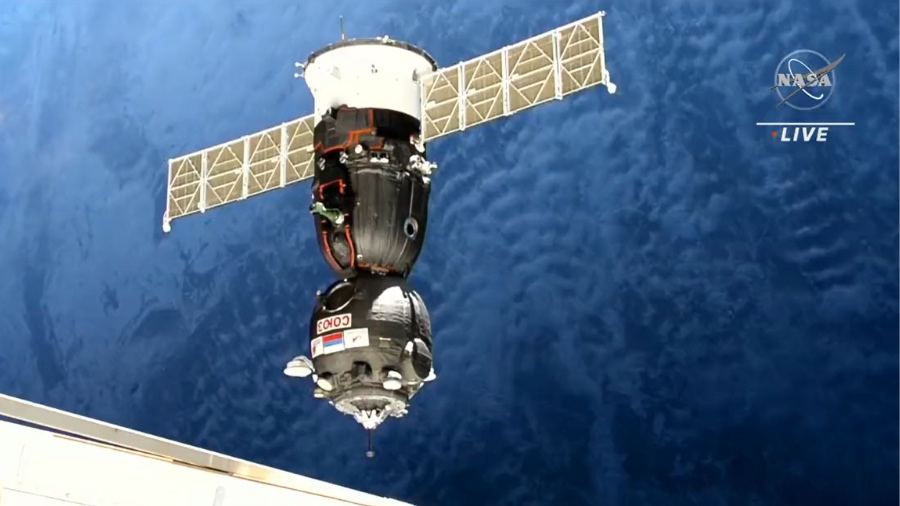
- Soyuz MS-23 arriving at the International Space Station
- Names: ISS 69S
- Mission type: Uncrewed spacecraft replacement mission to ISS
- Operator: Roscosmos
- COSPAR ID: 2023-024A
- SATCAT no.: 55688
- Mission duration: 215 days, 10 hours and 53 minutes

Spacecraft properties
- Spacecraft: Soyuz MS No. 754
- Spacecraft type: Soyuz MS
- Manufacturer: Energia

Crew
- Crew size: 0 up, 3 down
- Landing: Sergey Prokopyev; Dmitry Petelin; Francisco Rubio

Start of mission
- Launch date: 24 February 2023, 00:24 UTC
- Rocket: Soyuz 2.1a
- Launch site: Baikonur, 31/6
- Contractor: RKTs Progress

End of mission
- Landing date: 27 September 2023, 11:17 UTC
- Landing site: Kazakh Steppe, Kazakhstan

Orbital parameters
- Reference system: Geocentric orbit
- Regime: Low Earth orbit
- Inclination: 51.66°

Docking with ISS
- Docking port: Poisk zenith
- Docking date: 26 February 2023, 00:58 UTC
- Undocking date: 6 April 2023, 08:45 UTC
- Time docked: 39 days, 7 hours and 47 minutes

Docking with ISS (relocation) (Note: Because Poisk module needs to be clear for depressurization during spacewalks.)
- Docking port: Prichal nadir
- Docking date: 6 April 2023, 09:22 UTC
- Undocking date: 27 September 2023, 07:54:21 UTC
- Time docked: 173 days, 22 hours and 32 minutes

Cargo
- Mass: ~430 kg (950 lb)
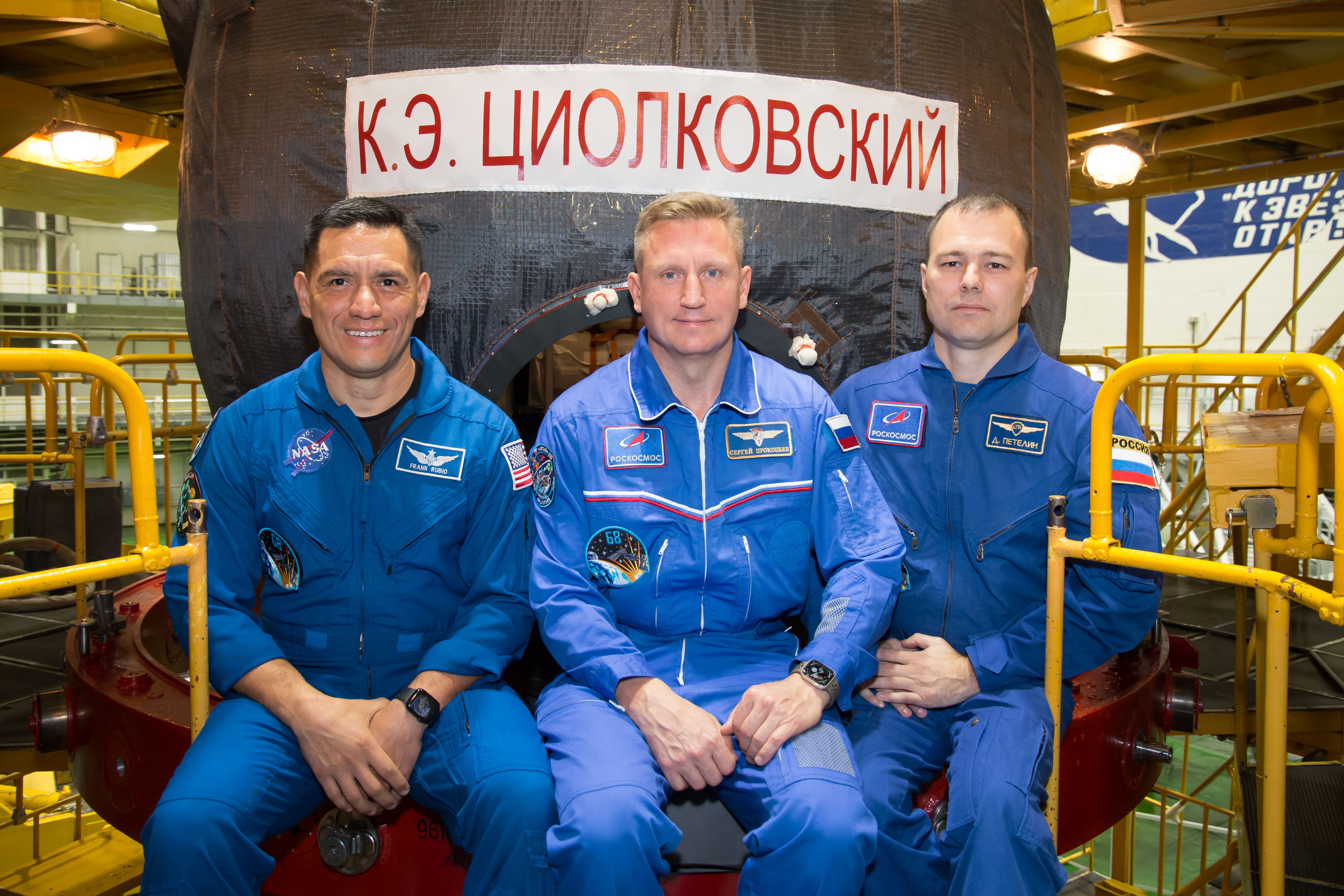
- Landing mission insignia, which incorporated elements from the launching mission insignia From left: Rubio, Prokopyev, and Petelin Soyuz programme

Soyuz MS-23 was an uncrewed Russian Soyuz spaceflight that launched from Baikonur on 24 February 2023 to the International Space Station to replace the damaged Soyuz MS-22 spacecraft for landing that NASA astronaut Francisco Rubio and Roscosmos cosmonauts Sergey Prokopyev and Dmitry Petelin launched onboard on 21 September 2022 and had a coolant leak on 14 December before returning to Earth uncrewed on 28 March 2023.

== Background ==
Due to the 0.8 mm (0.031 in)-diameter hole punctured in the radiator of Soyuz MS-22 due to micro-meteoroid impact, there were doubts over the safety of Soyuz MS-22. So it was returned uncrewed like Soyuz 32, and MS-23 was launched uncrewed like Soyuz 34 as a replacement. As it was launched uncrewed, it carried ~430 kg (950 lb) dry cargo and equipment in its pressurized section, like a Progress MS spacecraft.

Until the replacement MS-23 docked with the ISS, SpaceX Crew-5 was considered among the options to return the MS-22 crew in case of emergency. This is due to the fact that SpaceX originally designed the Crew Dragon to host a crew of seven at a time. Due to these reasons, the International Space Station mission management team decided to move NASA astronaut Francisco Rubio's Soyuz seat liner from the Soyuz MS-22 spacecraft to Dragon Endurance to provide lifeboat capabilities in the event Rubio would need to return to Earth because of an emergency evacuation from the space station. The seat liner was moved on 17 January 2023, with installation and configuration continuing through most of the day, 18 January 2023. This seat liner swapping is not new between two Soyuz, but this was the first time swapping from Soyuz to Crew Dragon. The change allowed for increased crew protection by reducing the heat load inside the MS-22 spacecraft for cosmonauts Prokopyev and Petelin in the event of an emergency return to Earth. Alongside SpaceX Crew-6 space capsule is designed to bring back crew serving as an emergency evacuation after Crew-5.

As Soyuz MS-22 was unable to perform crew return, it reentered uncrewed like Soyuz 32, and MS-23 was launched empty like Soyuz 34 to return the crew. The original crewed mission was delayed and reassigned to Soyuz MS-24.

As the MS-23 arrived at the space station on 26 February, Rubio's seat liner was transferred to the new Soyuz on 6 March, and the seat liners for Sergey Prokopyev and Dmitry Petelin were moved from MS-22 to MS-23 on 2 March ahead of their return in the Soyuz.

== Crew ==
Position	Launching crew	Landing crew
Commander	None	Sergey Prokopyev, Roscosmos; Expedition 67/68/69; Second spaceflight
Flight engineer	None	Dmitry Petelin, Roscosmos; Expedition 67/68/69; First spaceflight
Flight engineer	None	Francisco Rubio, NASA; Expedition 67/68/69; First spaceflight

=== Original crew ===
Position	Crew member
Commander	Oleg Kononenko, Roscosmos
Flight engineer	Nikolai Chub, Roscosmos
Flight engineer	(United States) Loral O'Hara, NASA

=== Backup crew ===
Position	Crew member
Commander	Aleksey Ovchinin, Roscosmos
Flight engineer	(United States) Tracy Caldwell Dyson, NASA
