= Soyuz 34 =

1979 Soviet uncrewed spaceflight to Salyut 6

- Operator: Soviet space program
- COSPAR ID: 1979-049A
- SATCAT no.: 11387
- Mission duration: 73 days, 18 hours and 16 minutes
- Orbits completed: ~1,200

Spacecraft properties
- Spacecraft type: Soyuz 7K-T
- Manufacturer: NPO Energia
- Launch mass: 6,800 kg (15,000 lb)

Crew
- Crew size: 0 up 2 down
- Landing: Vladimir Lyakhov; Valery Ryumin

Start of mission
- Launch date: June 6, 1979, 18:12:41 UTC
- Rocket: Soyuz-U
- Launch site: Baikonur 31/6

End of mission
- Landing date: August 19, 1979, 12:29:26 UTC
- Landing site: 170 km (110 mi) SE of Dzhezkazgan

Orbital parameters
- Reference system: Geocentric
- Regime: Low Earth
- Perigee altitude: 199 km (124 mi)
- Apogee altitude: 271.5 km (168.7 mi)
- Inclination: 51.62 degrees
- Period: 88.91 minutes

Docking with Salyut 6
- Docking port: Aft
- Docking date: June 8, 1979, 20:02:06 UTC
- Undocking date: June 14, 1979
- Time docked: 6 days

Redocking with Salyut 6
- Redocking port: Front
- Redocking date: June 14, 1979
- Unredocking date: August 19, 1979, 12:29:26 UTC
- Time redocked: 66 days

Soyuz 34 (Russian: Союз 34, Union 34) was a 1979 Soviet uncrewed space flight to the Salyut 6 space station. It was sent to supply the resident crew a reliable return vehicle after the previous flight, Soyuz 33, suffered an engine failure.

Mission control decided to re-design the engine used on Soyuz craft as a result of the Soyuz 33 failure, and to return the Soyuz 32 craft which transported Vladimir Lyakhov and Valery Ryumin to the space station to Earth uncrewed as it had the same suspect engine as Soyuz 33. Soyuz 34 successfully returned the crew to earth 73 days after launching.

== Crew ==
Position	Launching cosmonaut	Landing cosmonaut
Commander	None	Vladimir Lyakhov; First spaceflight
Flight engineer	None	Valery Ryumin; Second spaceflight

== Mission parameters ==
- Mass: 6,800 kg (15,000 lb)
- Perigee: 199 km (124 mi)
- Apogee: 271.5 km (168.7 mi)
- Inclination: 51.62°
- Period: 88.91 minutes

== Mission highlights ==
Soyuz 34 had been intended to have been launched around 6 June 1979 with a two-man Hungarian/Soviet crew. That crew would have presumably returned in Soyuz 33 which had been planned to be docked at the Salyut 6 space station. Suspicions this was originally to be a Hungarian/Soviet flight were confirmed in 1980 when press releases for an upcoming joint mission were still dated June 1979.

However, the engine failure during Soyuz 33's flight in April necessitated a shuffling of planned missions. Because the engine used in that flight was the same model already docked at the space station on Soyuz 32 and the resident crew of Vladimir Lyakhov and Valery Ryumin needed a reliable craft to return to Earth in, it was decided that the engine needed to be modified and a fresh return vehicle sent to the station - vacant.

Soyuz 34 was launched uncrewed on 6 June, and docked at the aft port of the space station on 9 June. The flight itself was a test of the new engine and its success meant the crew had a reliable return craft. Since the craft was uncrewed, some biological samples for experiments were included on the flight.

Soyuz 32 was loaded with 130 kg of replaced instruments, processed materials, exposed film and other items with a total weight equal to that of the two cosmonauts. On 13 June, it undocked and returned to Earth uncrewed 295 km northwest of Dzhezkazgan. The craft was found to be in good condition. The next day, the crew redocked Soyuz 34 at the forward port to clear the aft port for Progress 7, a supply tanker.

On 19 August, the resident crew returned to earth in Soyuz 34, establishing a new space-endurance record of 175 days, surpassing the 139-day mission by the Soyuz 29 crew in 1978.

== Legacy ==
Years later, a similar scenario of crew return was required in 2022. As Soyuz MS-22 was unable to perform crew return due a coolant leak in external radiator, it returned uncrewed with cargo instead of crew like Soyuz 32, and Soyuz MS-23 was launched unmanned with cargo like Soyuz 34 as a replacement to return the crew.

== See also ==
- Soyuz MS-22
- Soyuz MS-23
