= Vasily Tsibliyev =

Russian cosmonaut (born 1954)

- Василий Циблиев
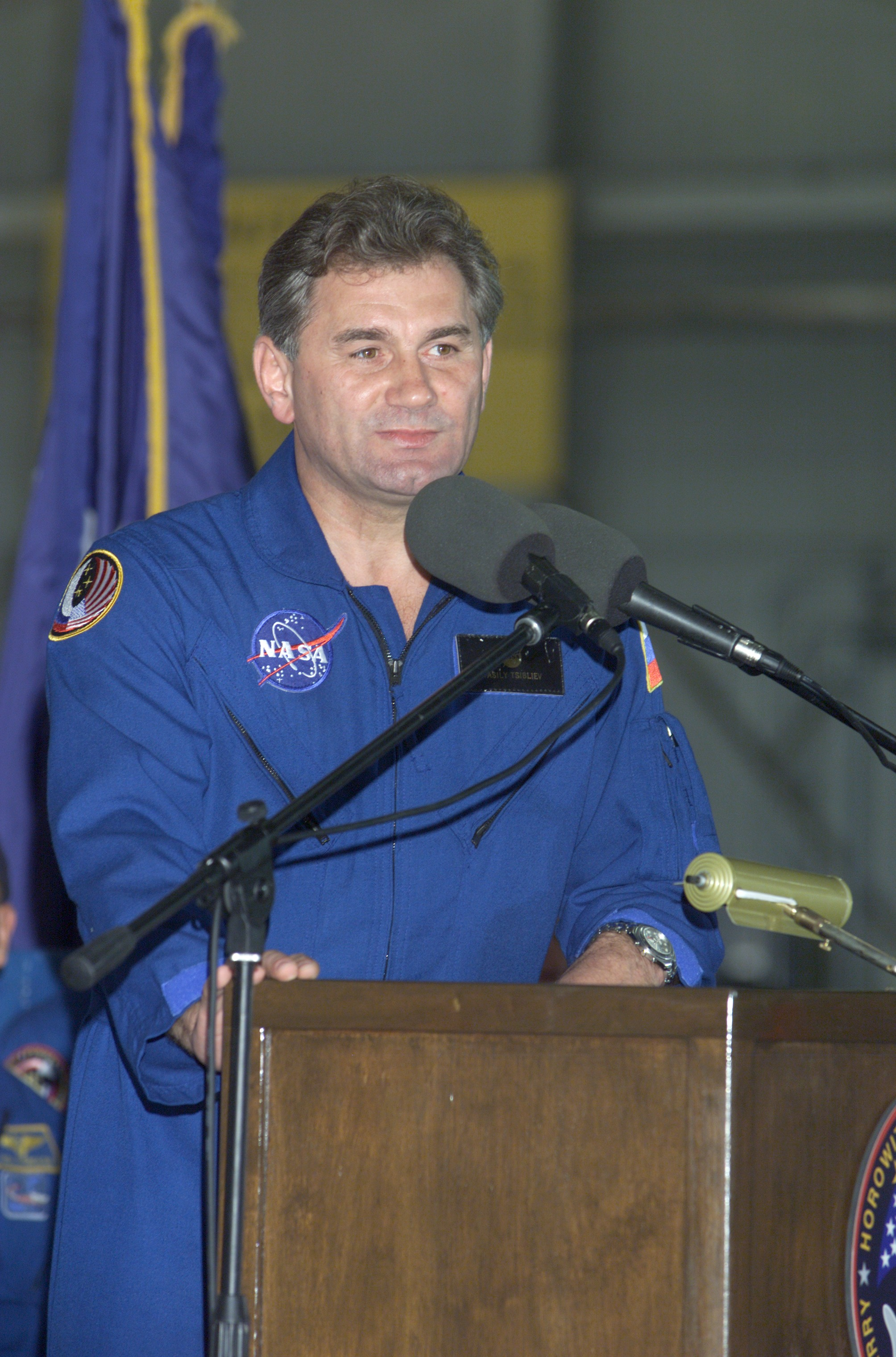
- Born: 20 February 1954 (age 72); Privetnoye, Russian SFSR, USSR (now Orikhivka, AR Crimea, Ukraine)
- Occupation: Pilot
- Space career

Roscosmos cosmonaut
- Status: Retired
- Rank: Lieutenant General, Russian Air Force
- Time in space: 381d 15h 52m
- Selection: 1987
- Total EVAs: 6 (5 during Mir EO-14, 1 during Mir EO-23)
- Total EVA time: 19h, 13m
- Missions: Soyuz TM-17 (Mir EO-14), Soyuz TM-25 (Mir EO-23)

Vasily Vasiliyevich Tsibliyev (Russian: Василий Василиевич Циблиев); born on February 20, 1954) is a retired Russian cosmonaut and former head of the Yuri Gagarin Cosmonaut Training Center.

== Life ==
He was selected as a cosmonaut on March 26, 1987. Tsibliyev flew as Commander on Soyuz TM-17 from July 1, 1993, to January 14, 1994, and on Soyuz TM-25 from February 2, 1997, to August 14 of the same year. He retired as a cosmonaut on June 19, 1998.

From 2003 to 2009, he headed the Yuri Gagarin Cosmonaut Training Center.

Tsibliyev is married with two children.

Tsibliyev was the commander in charge of Mir when it was hit by a Progress spacecraft in 1997.

== Honours and awards ==
- Hero of the Russian Federation (14 January 1994) - for courage and heroism displayed during spaceflight on the orbital scientific research complex Mir
- Order of Merit for the Fatherland, 3rd class (10 April 1998) - for courage and heroism displayed during prolonged space flight on the orbital scientific research complex Mir
- Medal "For Merit in Space Exploration" (12 April 2011) - for the great achievements in the field of research, development and use of outer space, many years of diligent work, public activities
- Medal for Battle Merit
- Medal "For Distinction in Military Service", 2nd class
- Medal "For Strengthening brotherhood in arms" (Bulgaria)
- NASA Exceptional Public Service Medal
- Pilot-Cosmonaut of the Russian Federation (14 January 1994) - for the successful implementation of spaceflight on the orbital scientific research complex Mir and expressed at high level of professionalism
- Prize Laureate Vladimir Vysotsky's "Own Track"

== See also ==
- List of Heroes of the Russian Federation
