= Soyuz TM-17 =

1993 Russian crewed spaceflight to Mir

- Operator: Rosaviakosmos
- COSPAR ID: 1993-043A
- SATCAT no.: 22704
- Mission duration: 196 days, 17 hours, 45 minutes, 22 seconds
- Orbits completed: ~3,070

Spacecraft properties
- Spacecraft: Soyuz 7K-STM No. 66
- Spacecraft type: Soyuz-TM
- Manufacturer: NPO Energia
- Launch mass: 7,150 kilograms (15,760 lb)

Crew
- Crew size: 3 up 2 down
- Members: Vasili Tsibliyev; Aleksandr Serebrov
- Launching: Jean-Pierre Haigneré
- Callsign: Си́риус (Sirius)

Start of mission
- Launch date: July 1, 1993, 14:32:58 UTC
- Rocket: Soyuz-U2

End of mission
- Landing date: January 14, 1994, 08:18:20 UTC
- Landing site: 49.62°N 70.12°E

Orbital parameters
- Reference system: Geocentric
- Regime: Low Earth
- Perigee altitude: 388 kilometres (241 mi)
- Apogee altitude: 397 kilometres (247 mi)
- Inclination: 51.6 degrees

Docking with Mir
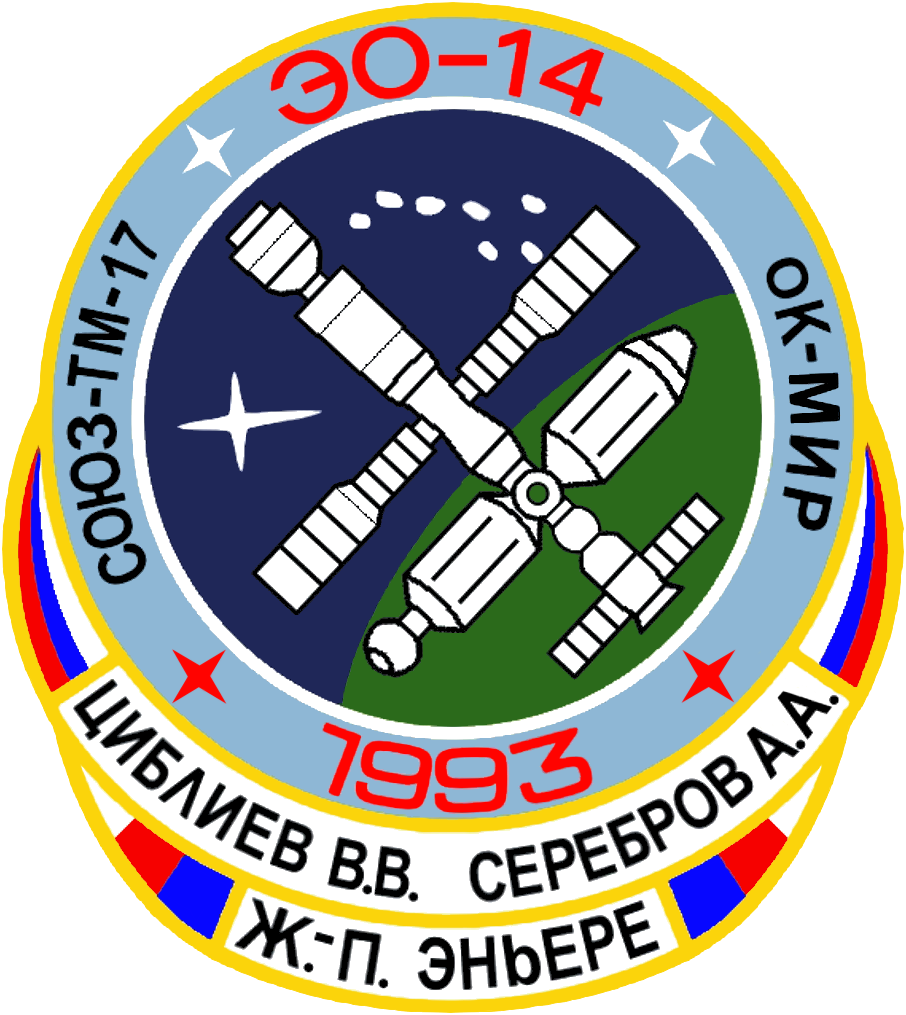
- Soyuz programme (Crewed missions)

Soyuz TM-17 was a Russian spaceflight to the space station Mir, launched on July 1, 1993. It carried Russian cosmonauts Vasily Tsibliyev and Aleksandr Serebrov, along with French astronaut Jean-Pierre Haigneré. It lasted 196 days and 17 hours, making more than 3,000 orbits of the planet Earth.

== Crew ==
Position	Launching crew	Landing crew
Commander	Vasili Tsibliyev; First spaceflight	
Flight engineer	Aleksandr Serebrov; Fourth and last spaceflight	
Research cosmonaut	Jean-Pierre Haigneré, CNES; First spaceflight	None

== Mission highlights ==
Soyuz TM-17 was the 17th expedition to the Russian Space Station Mir.

At 7:37:11 a.m. Moscow time (MT), on 1994 January 14, Soyuz TM-17 separated from the forward port of the Mir station. At 7:43:59 a.m., the Mission Control Center in Korolev (TsUP) ordered Tsibliyev to steer Soyuz TM-17 to within 15 metres of the Kristall module to begin photography of the APAS-89 docking system. At 7:46:20 a.m., Tsibliyev complained that Soyuz TM-17 was handling sluggishly. Serebrov, standing by for photography in the orbital module, then asked Tsibliyev to move the spacecraft out of the station plane because it was coming close to one of the solar arrays. In Mir, Viktor Afanasyev ordered Valeri Polyakov and Yuri Usachyov to evacuate to the Soyuz TM-18 spacecraft. At 7:47:30 a.m., controllers in the TsUP saw the image from Soyuz TM-17's external camera shake violently, and Serebrov reported that Soyuz TM-17 had hit Mir. The TsUP then lost communications with Mir and Soyuz TM-17. Intermittent communications were restored with Soyuz TM-17 at 7:52 a.m. Voice communications with Mir were not restored until 8:02 a.m. Inspection of Soyuz TM-17 indicated no serious damage. In this connection, the Russians revealed that they had studied contingency reentries by depressurized spacecraft in the wake of the Soyuz 11 accident. The Mir cosmonauts did not feel the impact, though the station's guidance system registered angular velocity and switched to free flying mode.

Later analysis indicated that the right side of the orbital module had struck Mir two glancing blows 2 seconds apart. The impact point was on Kristall, near its connection to the Mir base block. The cause of the impact was traced to a switch error: the hand controller in the orbital module which governed braking and acceleration was switched on, disabling the equivalent hand controller (the left motion control lever) in the descent module. Tsibliyev was able to use the right lever to steer the Soyuz past Mir's solar arrays, antennas, and docking ports after it became clear impact was inevitable.
