= Soyuz 33 =

1979 Soviet crewed spaceflight to Salyut 6

- Operator: Soviet space program
- COSPAR ID: 1979-029A
- SATCAT no.: 11324
- Mission duration: 1 day, 23 hours and 1 minute
- Orbits completed: 31

Spacecraft properties
- Spacecraft type: Soyuz 7K-T
- Manufacturer: NPO Energia
- Launch mass: 6,860 kg (15,120 lb)

Crew
- Crew size: 2
- Members: Nikolai Rukavishnikov; Georgi Ivanov
- Callsign: Сатурн (Saturn) - "Saturn"

Start of mission
- Launch date: April 10, 1979, 17:34:34 UTC
- Rocket: Soyuz-U
- Launch site: Baikonur 1/5

End of mission
- Landing date: April 12, 1979, 16:35:40 UTC
- Landing site: 320 km (200 mi) SE of Dzhezkazgan

Orbital parameters
- Reference system: Geocentric
- Regime: Low Earth
- Perigee altitude: 198.6 km (123.4 mi)
- Apogee altitude: 279.2 km (173.5 mi)
- Inclination: 51.61°
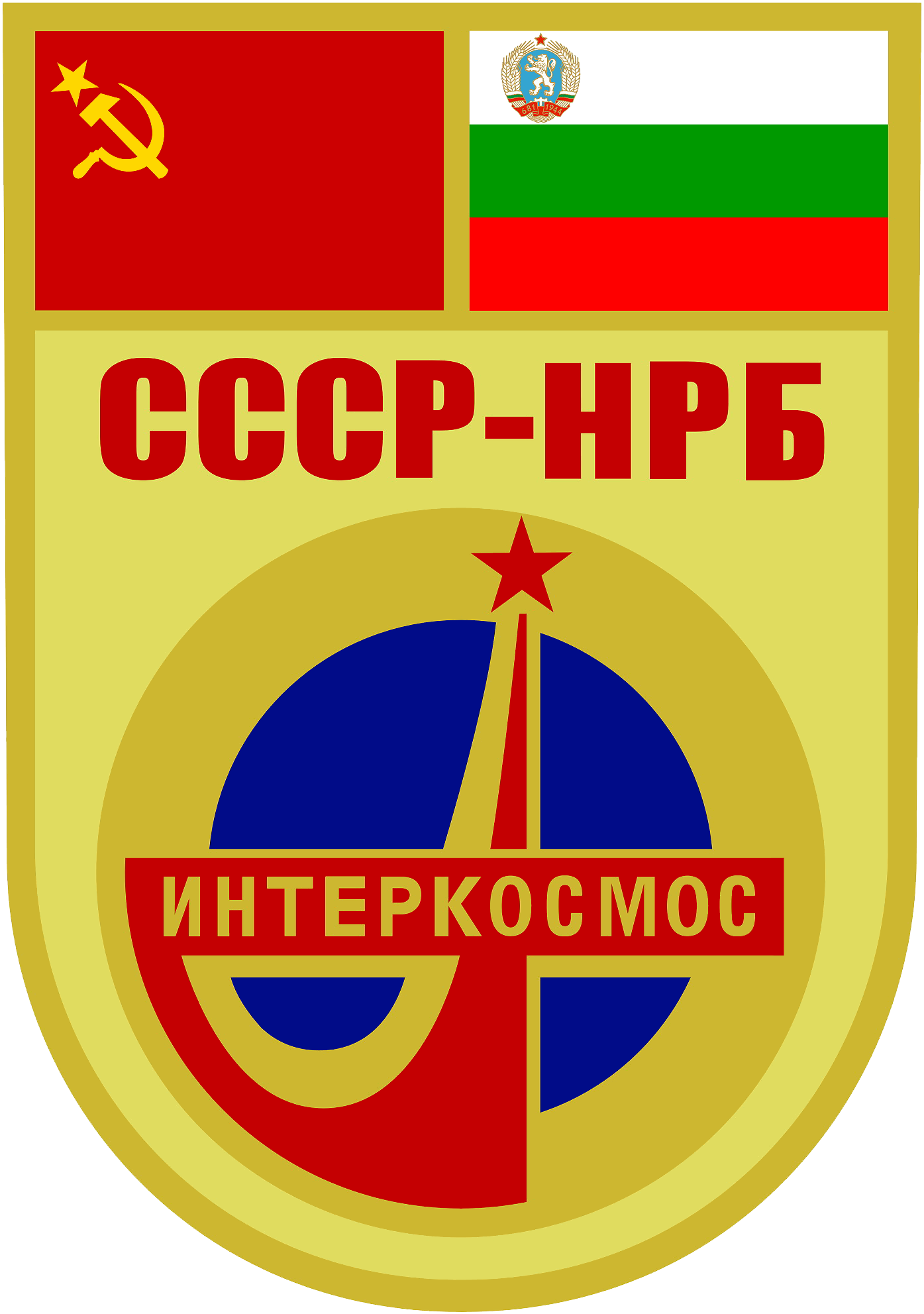
- Soyuz programme

Soyuz 33 (Russian: Союз 33, Union 33) was an April, 1979, Soviet crewed space flight to the Salyut 6 space station. It was the ninth mission to the orbiting facility, but an engine failure forced the mission to be aborted, and the crew had to return to Earth before docking with the station. It was the first failure of a Soyuz engine during orbital operations.

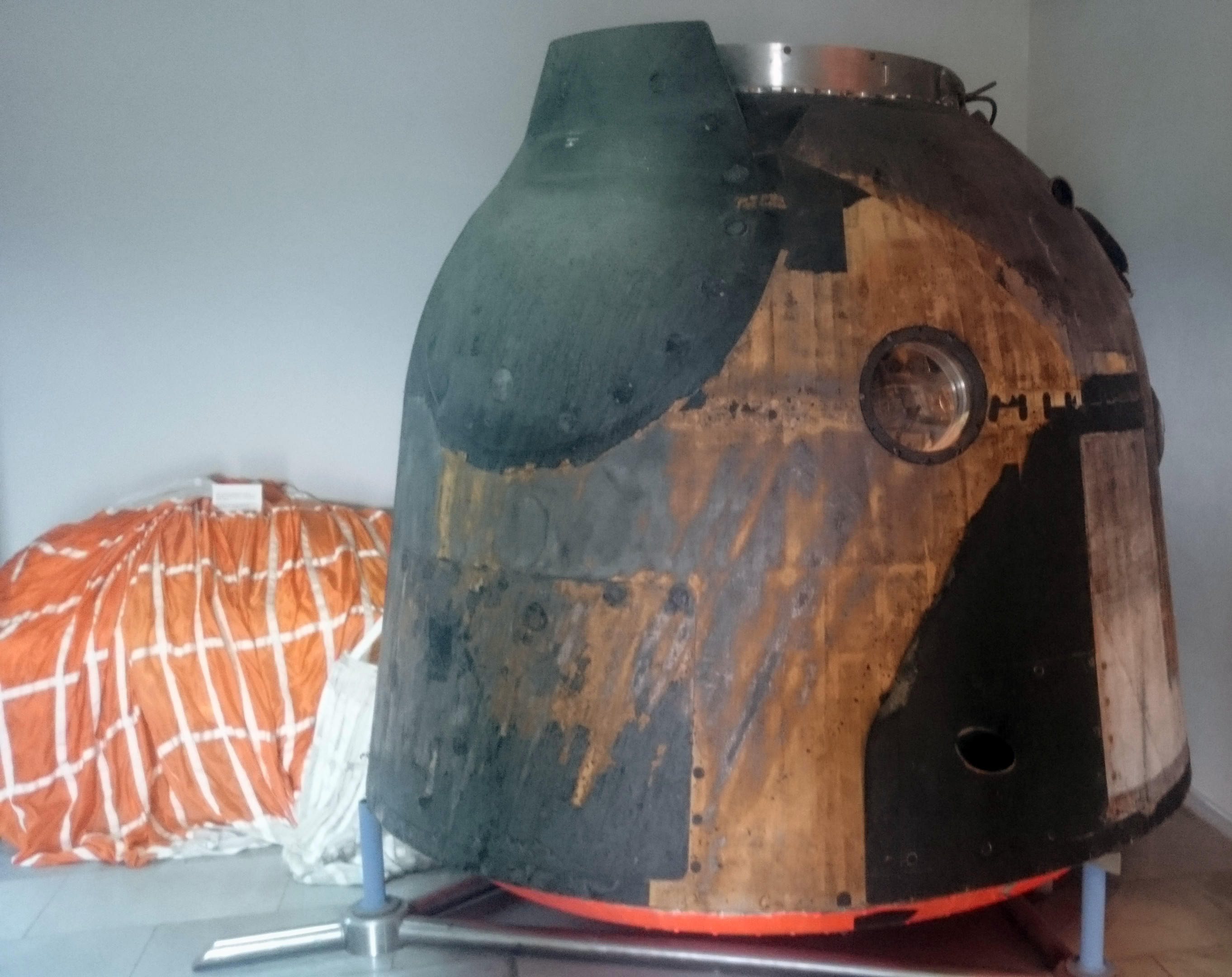
Soyuz 33 descent module in Aviation museum Plovdiv

The two-man crew, commander Nikolai Rukavishnikov and Bulgarian cosmonaut Georgi Ivanov, suffered a steep ballistic re-entry, but were safely recovered. The original intention of the mission had been to visit the orbiting crew for about a week and leave a fresh vehicle for the station crew to return to Earth in. The mission failure meant that the orbiting Salyut 6 crew lacked a reliable return vehicle as their Soyuz had the same suspect engine as Soyuz 33. A subsequent crewed flight was canceled and a vacant craft (Soyuz 34) with a redesigned engine was sent for the crew to use.

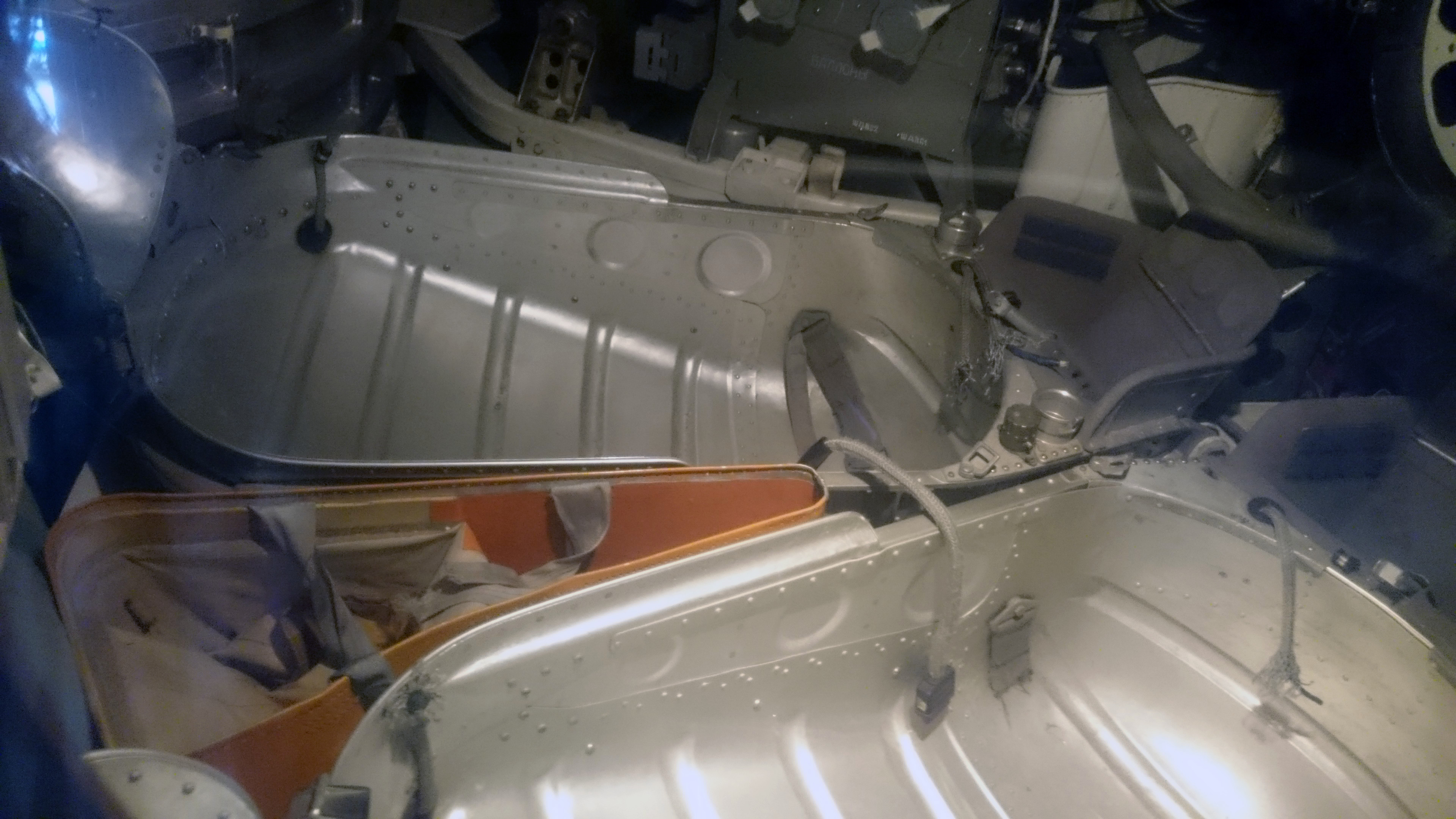
Inside of Soyuz 33 descent module in Aviation museum Plovdiv

== Crew ==
Prime crew
| Position | Cosmonaut |
|---|---|
| Commander | Nikolai Rukavishnikov; Third and last spaceflight |
| Research cosmonaut | Georgi Ivanov, Interkosmos; Only spaceflight |

Backup crew
| Position | Cosmonaut |
|---|---|
| Commander | Yuri Romanenko |
| Research cosmonaut | Aleksandar Aleksandrov, Interkosmos |

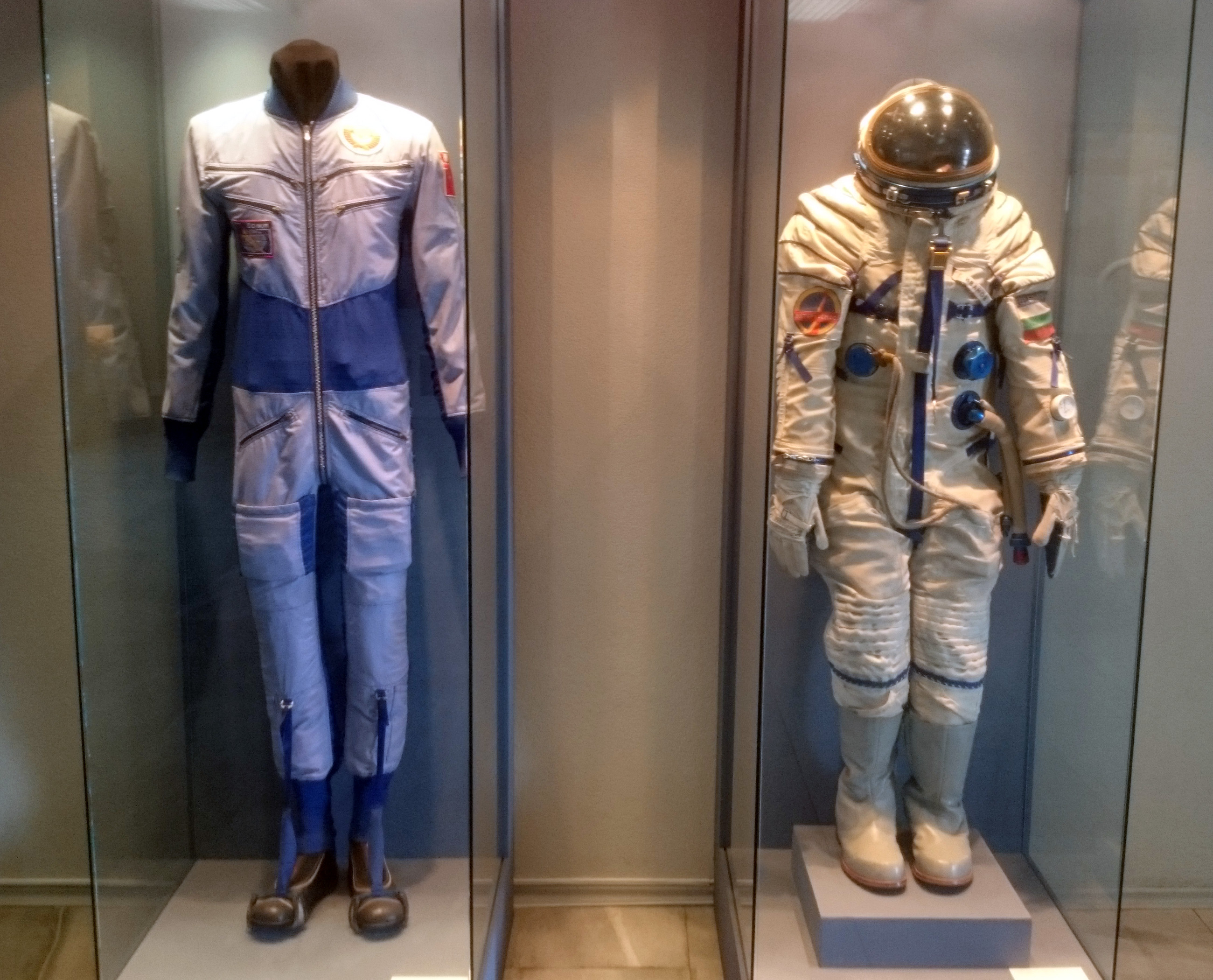
Space and work suits of Georgi Ivanov in Aviation museum Plovdiv

== Mission parameters ==
- Mass: 6,860 kg (15,120 lb)
- Perigee: 198.6 km (123.4 mi)
- Apogee: 279.2 km (173.5 mi)
- Inclination: 51.63°
- Period: 88.99 minutes

== Mission highlights ==
After a two-day delay caused by a windstorm at the launch site, Soyuz 33 was launched 10 April 1979 with the fourth international crew in the Soviet Intercosmos program. Bulgarian cosmonaut Georgi Ivanov joined commander Nikolai Rukavishnikov as the craft proceeded normally towards the Salyut 6 space station.

Rukavishnikov was the first civilian to command a Soviet spacecraft, and Ivanov the first Bulgarian in space.

At 9 kilometres (5.6 mi) distance from the station, the Igla automatic docking system was activated. But, as the craft approached to 1,000 meters (3,300 ft), the engine failed and automatically shut down after three seconds of a planned six-second burn. Rukavishnikov had to hold the instrument panel as the craft shook so violently. After consulting with ground control, the docking system was activated again, but the engine shut down again, and Valery Ryumin, observing from the station, reported an abnormal lateral glow from behind the Soyuz during the burn. Mission control accordingly aborted the mission and told the crew to prepare to return to Earth. It was the first in-orbit failure of the Soyuz propulsion system.

The failure was determined to be a malfunction of the main engine. A pressure sensor in the combustion chamber was shutting down the engine when it seemed normal combustion pressure was not being reached. This shut-down mechanism was designed to prevent propellants from being pumped into a damaged engine thus risking damage or an explosion.

The crew requested another attempt at an engine burn, but were denied and told to sleep. A recovery attempt could not be made for another day. Rukavishnikov could not sleep, however, and thought about the novel Marooned, which featured an American space crew stranded in orbit.

It was only in 1983 that the Soviets revealed how serious the situation was. The craft had a backup engine but it was feared that it may have been damaged by the main engine, potentially leaving the crew stranded with five days of supplies while it would take ten days for the orbit to decay. One option to return the crew if the backup engine was inoperable would have been to use attitude control thrusters to slow the Soyuz below orbit velocity, but it was not known if there was enough propellant to do this, and the landing point would have been unpredictable even if it had worked. Another option was to move the station to the Soyuz. The station could have been moved to within 1,000 m of the craft, at which point Soyuz 33 could be docked using its thrusters, but the two craft were drifting apart at 28 metres per second (92 ft/s), and time was needed to calculate the maneuvers. In any event, four crew on the station with one malfunctioning Soyuz and a second Soyuz (the station crew's Soyuz 32, already docked at Salyut 6) with a now-questionable engine (it had the same type as Soyuz 33) was not considered the best option.

The main option was to fire the backup engine, but this option was not guaranteed to work, even if the engine fired. The nominal burn time was 188 seconds, and as long as the burn lasted more than 90 seconds, the crew could manually restart the engine to compensate. But this would mean an inaccurate landing. If the burn was less than 90 seconds, the crew could be stranded in orbit. A burn longer than 188 seconds could result in excessive G-loads on the crew during reentry.

In the end, the backup engine did fire, though for 213 seconds, 25 seconds too long, resulting in the craft taking an unusually steep trajectory and the crew having to endure an acceleration of 10 gs. Rukavishnikov and Ivanov were safely recovered. It was the second ballistic entry reported by the Soviets, Soyuz 1 being the first (although Soyuz 18a was a ballistic reentry, and Soyuz 24 reportedly also was one).

An investigation lasted a month and found that the part that failed had been tested 8,000 times previously without failing, and the Soyuz engine had fired some 2,000 times since 1967, also without a single failure. But the engine was modified for the next flight, and a vacant Soyuz with the newly modified engine, Soyuz 34, was sent to the orbiting Salyut for the crew there to return with.
