= Georgi Ivanov (cosmonaut) =

Bulgarian cosmonaut (born 1940)

- Георги Иванов
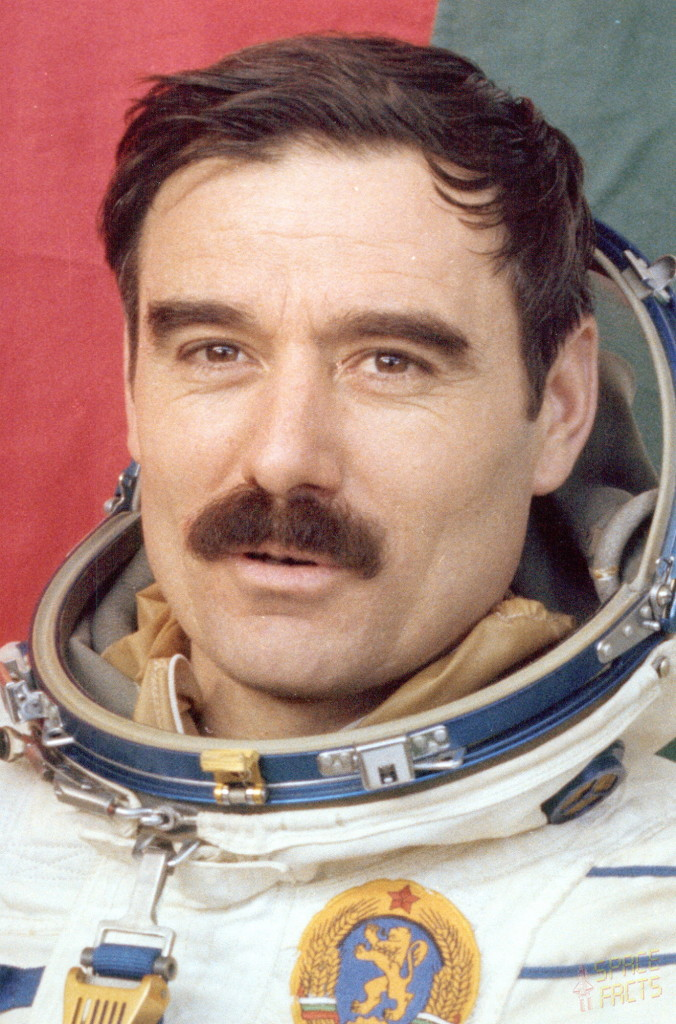
- Born: 2 July 1940 (age 86); Lovech, Kingdom of Bulgaria
- Occupation: Pilot
- Awards: Hero of the Soviet Union
- Space career

Intercosmos Cosmonaut
- Status: Retired
- Rank: Major General
- Time in space: 1d 23h 01m
- Selection: 1978 Intercosmos Group
- Missions: Soyuz 33 (failed docking with Salyut 6)
- Retired: 12 April 1989

Major general Georgi Ivanov Kakalov (Bulgarian: Георги Иванов Какалов; born 2 July 1940) is a Bulgarian former military officer who was the first Bulgarian cosmonaut. He was a member of the National Assembly of Bulgaria in 1990.

== Early life and military career ==
Born in Lovech, Georgi Kakalov attended the Military Air-force School in Dolna Mitropolia. After completing the five-year program, he served in the Bulgarian People's Army as a military pilot. A few years later he became an instructor and head of a division.

He was selected to participate in the Soviet International Space Programme Interkosmos in 1978 and to follow the Soyuz spaceship training programme.

Meanwhile, he changed his family name to Ivanov, because his original surname Kakalov sounded very similar to "Кака" (excrements).

After intensive training, Georgi Ivanov was selected for the fourth mission under the Interkosmos programme, bringing Bulgaria to the 6th place among the countries that had their national space explorers.

== Intercosmos program ==
Ivanov, along with Soviet cosmonaut Nikolai Rukavishnikov, was launched into space as part of the Soyuz 33 mission from Baikonur Cosmodrome on 10 April 1979, at 17:34 (GMT). The scientific program for the flight was prepared entirely by Bulgarian scientists, along with some of the equipment.

Though take-off was smooth, the mission was a disaster, with severe damage of the engine preventing docking in orbit to Salyut 6 orbital station as it was initially planned. A premature return to Earth became the only possible decision for Ivanov and Rukavishnikov. Due to some additional technical problems landing was difficult to endure-more than 9Gs. When Soyuz 33 finally landed, it was 320 kilometres (200 mi) southeast of Dzhezkazgan. It completed 31 orbits, and was in space for 1 day, 23 hours, and 1 minute. The flight remains the only example for manual landing and is thus quoted in every astronautic textbook.

Ivanov was awarded the title Hero of the Soviet Union on 13 April 1979. He earned a Ph.D. in space engineering. He was selected to the National Assembly and took part in the creation of the new democratic Constitution of the Republic of Bulgaria.

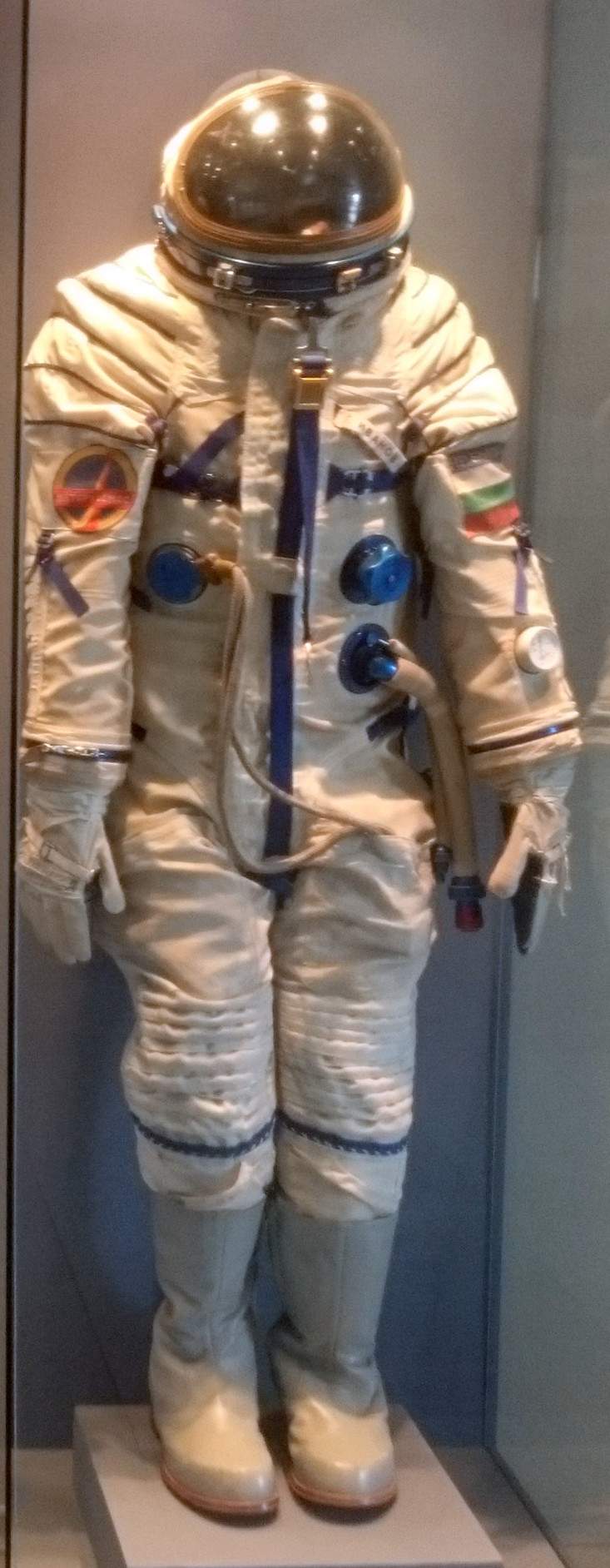
Georgi Ivanov's space suit in Aviation museum Plovdiv

== Personal life ==
Since 1993, Ivanov has been the executive director of Air Sofia.

Ivanov was married to Natalya Rousanova; they have one daughter, Ani (born 1967), and divorced in 1982. He is currently married to Lidia and they have one son, Ivan (born 1984). His hobbies include skiing, fishing, and golf. Ivanov is a member of the ASE — Association of the Space Explorers. He founded the Future in Space Foundation.

== Honours and awards ==
- Hero of the People's Republic of Bulgaria (1979)
- Hero of the Soviet Union (1979)
- Honorary citizen of Lovech (29 April 1979)
- Order of Georgi Dimitrov (1979)
- Order of Lenin (Soviet Union) (1979)
- Order of Stara Planina, 1st class with Sword (2004)
- Medal "For Merit in Space Exploration" (Russian Federation)

== See also ==
- Bulgarian cosmonaut program
