= Nikolai Rukavishnikov =

Soviet cosmonaut (1932–2002)

- Николай Рукавишников
- Born: September 18, 1932; Tomsk, USSR
- Died: 19 October 2002 (aged 70); Moscow, Russia
- Occupation: Physicist
- Awards: Hero of the Soviet Union (twice)
- Space career

Cosmonaut
- Time in space: 9d 21h 09m
- Selection: Civilian Specialist Group 2
- Missions: Soyuz 10 (failed docking with Salyut 1), Soyuz 16, Soyuz 33 (failed docking with Salyut 6)
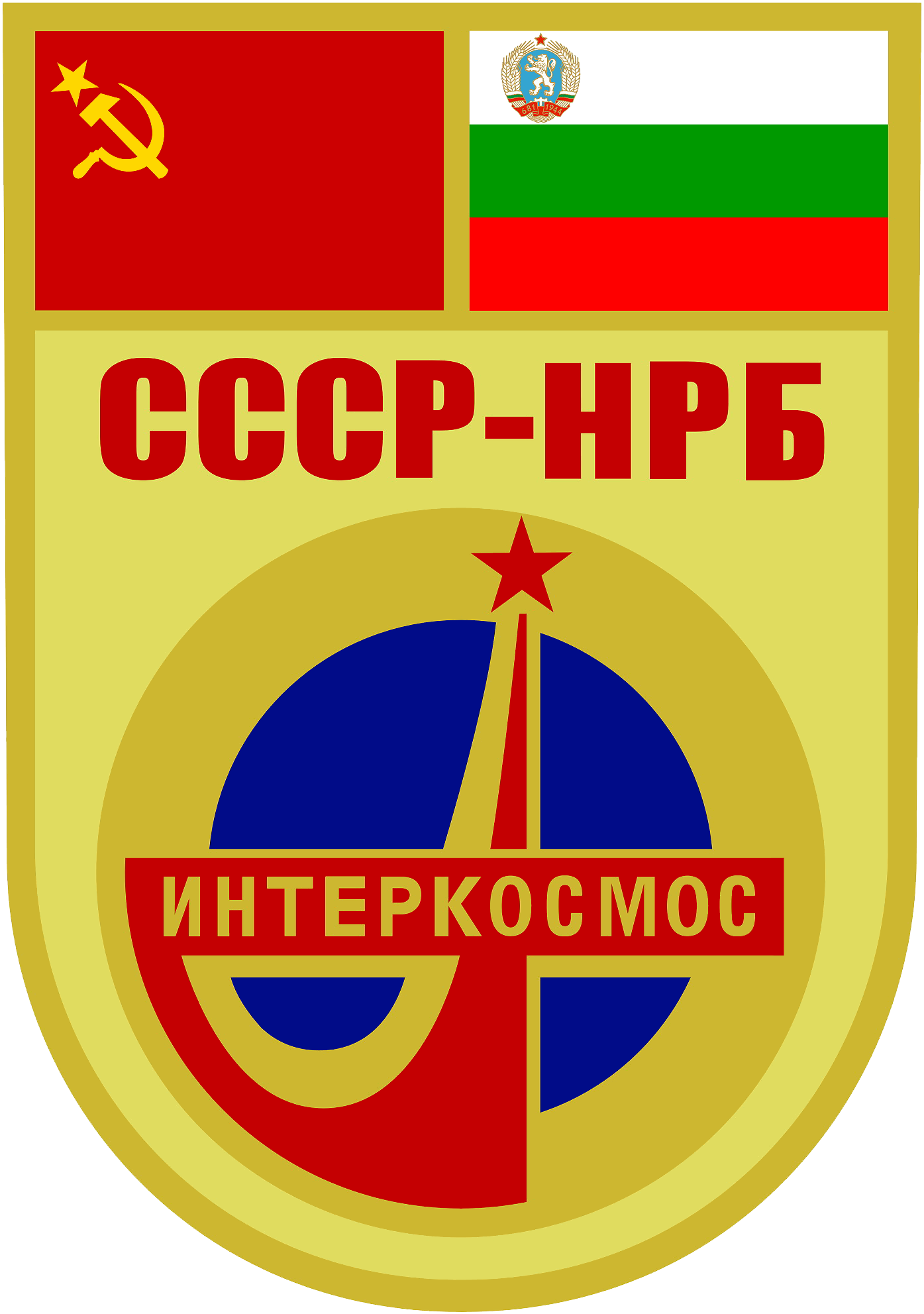
- Mission insignia

Nikolai Nikolayevich Rukavishnikov (Russian: Никола́й Никола́евич Рукави́шников; 18 September 1932 – 19 October 2002) was a Soviet cosmonaut who flew three space missions of the Soyuz programme: Soyuz 10, Soyuz 16, and Soyuz 33. Two of these missions, Soyuz 10 and Soyuz 33, were intended to dock with Salyut space stations, but failed to do so.

== Biography ==
Rukavishnikov studied at the Moscow Engineering and Physics Institute and after graduation worked for Sergey Korolev's design bureau. He was selected for cosmonaut training in 1967.

Rukavishnikov became the 50th human to fly in space on 23 April 1971, the launch date of Soyuz 10. The mission, along with Vladimir Shatalov and Aleksei Yeliseyev, was intended to dock with the Salyut 1 space station. They were unable to dock, and returned to Earth two days later.

He began his second flight, Soyuz 16, on 2 December 1974, with Anatoly Filipchenko. The mission was a test of the Soyuz 7K-TM hardware being used in the Apollo–Soyuz Test Project. The mission lasted six days, and was a complete success.

His third flight, Soyuz 33, was an Intercosmos flight to the Salyut 6 space station on 10 April 1979 with Bulgarian cosmonaut Georgi Ivanov. On its final approach, the spacecraft's main engine failed, and the docking was aborted. They were able to return to Earth with the backup engine, but an overly-long re-entry burn led to a 10-g ballistic re-entry. The crew was recovered safely.

Rukavishnikov resigned from the space programme in 1987, and returned to work for the same bureau he started with, by then known as Energia.

He died of a heart attack on 19 October 2002.

He was awarded:

- Twice Hero of the Soviet Union
- Pilot-Cosmonaut of the USSR
- Four Orders of Lenin
- Hero of the Mongolian People's Republic
- Hero of the People's Republic of Bulgaria
- Order of Sukhbaatar (People's Republic of Mongolia)
- Order of Georgi Dimitrov (People's Republic of Bulgaria)
