= Soyuz MS-22 =

2022 Russian crewed spaceflight to the ISS

- The emanating "stream of flakes" venting from Soyuz MS-22
- Names: ISS 68S
- Mission type: ISS crew transport
- Operator: Roscosmos
- COSPAR ID: 2022-116A
- SATCAT no.: 53879
- Mission duration: 187 days, 21 hours and 52 minutes
- Orbits completed: 2,914

Spacecraft properties
- Spacecraft: Soyuz MS-22 No. 751
- Spacecraft type: Soyuz MS
- Manufacturer: Energia
- Launch mass: 7,080 kg (15,610 lb)

Crew
- Crew size: 3 up, 0 down
- Launching: Sergey Prokopyev; Dmitry Petelin; Francisco Rubio
- Callsign: Altai

Start of mission
- Launch date: 21 September 2022, 13:54:50 UTC
- Rocket: Soyuz 2.1a
- Launch site: Baikonur, 31/6
- Contractor: RKTs Progress

End of mission
- Landing date: 28 March 2023, 11:45:58 UTC
- Landing site: Kazakh Steppe, Kazakhstan

Orbital parameters
- Reference system: Geocentric orbit
- Regime: Low Earth orbit
- Inclination: 51.66°

Docking with ISS
- Docking port: Rassvet nadir
- Docking date: 21 September 2022, 17:06:34 UTC
- Undocking date: 28 March 2023, 09:57:27 UTC
- Time docked: 187 days, 16 hours and 51 minutes

Payload
- Down Cargo
- Mass: ~218 kg (481 lb)
- Pressurised: ~218 kg (481 lb)
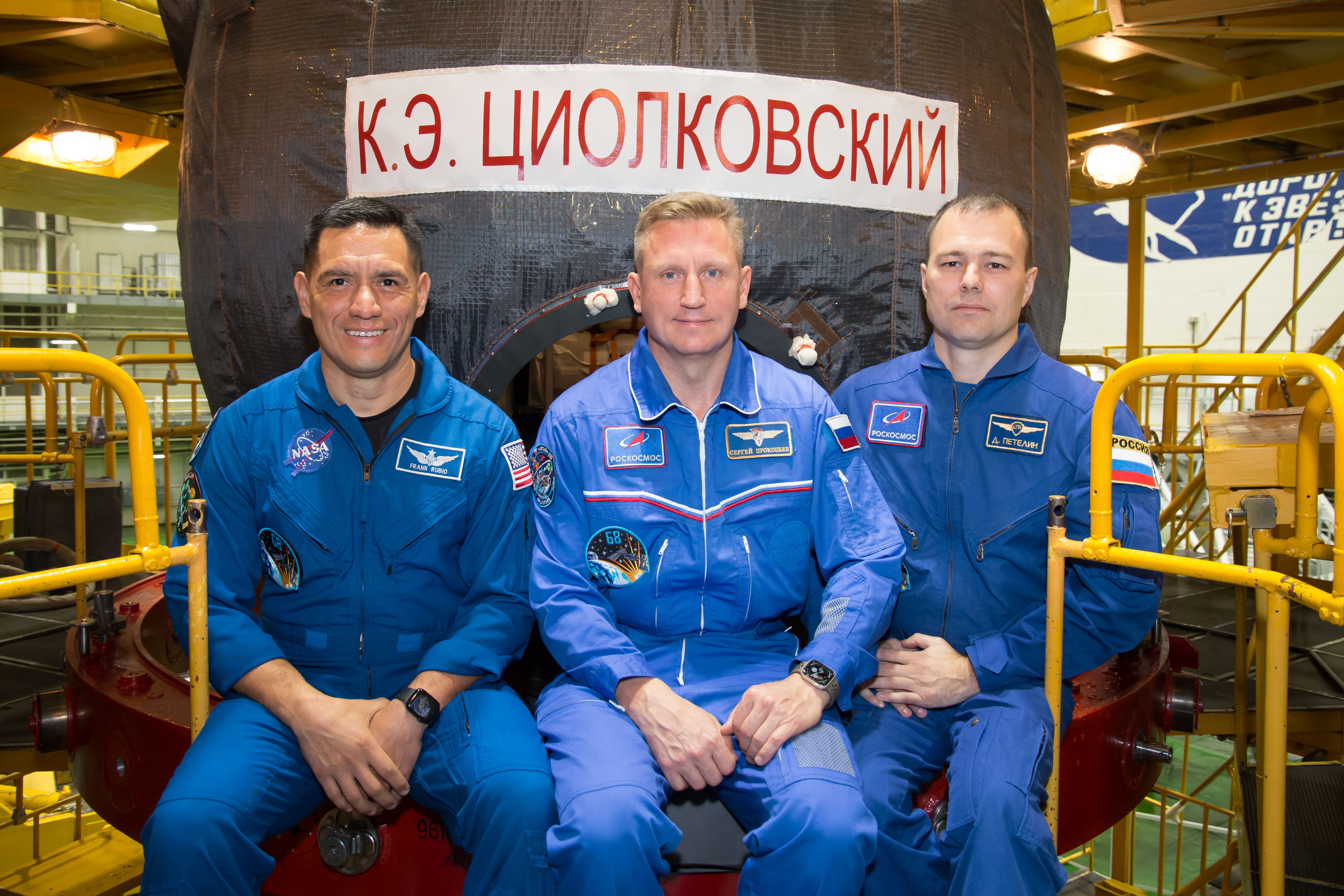
- Launching mission insignia From left: Rubio, Prokopyev, and Petelin Soyuz programme

Soyuz MS-22 was a Russian Soyuz spaceflight to the International Space Station with a crew of three launched from Baikonur Cosmodrome on 21 September 2022. The launch, previously planned for 13 September 2022, was subsequently delayed to 21 September 2022 for a mission length of 188 days.

== Crew ==
The original three-Russian member crew was named in May 2021. American astronaut Francisco Rubio replaced Anna Kikina as a part of the Soyuz-Dragon crew swap system of keeping at least one NASA astronaut and one Roscosmos cosmonaut on each of the crew rotation missions. This allows continuous space station occupation by US and Russia and keep backup crew scenarios to prevent vehicle either vehicle grounding like Soyuz MS-10 launch failure or to compensate for delays in launch of crew rotation missions of either vehicles like SpaceX Crew-3, that was delayed due to unfavorable launch weather conditions.

| Position | Launching crew member | Landing crew member |
|---|---|---|
| Commander | Sergey Prokopyev, Roscosmos; Expedition 67/68/69; Second spaceflight | None |
| Flight engineer | Dmitry Petelin, Roscosmos; Expedition 67/68/69; First spaceflight | None |
| Flight engineer | Francisco Rubio, NASA; Expedition 67/68/69; First spaceflight | None |

=== Backup crew ===
| Position | Crew member |
|---|---|
| Commander | Oleg Kononenko, Roscosmos |
| Flight engineer | Nikolai Chub, Roscosmos |
| Flight engineer | (United States) Loral O'Hara, NASA |

== Spacecraft ==
Timelapse of the launch

The spacecraft is named after Russian scientist Konstantin Tsiolkovsky, one of the pioneers of modern rocketry and astronautics. Tsiolkovsky's 165th birthday fell on 17 September, a few days before the launch of MS-22.

== Cooling loop accident ==
On 15 December 2022 at 12:45 UTC, a "visible stream of flakes" was observed emanating from the Soyuz spacecraft, concurrent with a loss of pressure in the external radiator cooling loop. A scheduled spacewalk for Petelin and Prokopyev was cancelled while the incident was evaluated.

The leak in the radiator occurred due to a micro-meteorite impact. The damage left a 0.8 mm diameter (0.031 in) hole into the external cooling radiator on the service module.

Two working groups were formed to find the cause of the incident, analyze the technical condition of the ship and develop recommendations for further actions for ground specialists and the cosmonauts.

According to tests conducted on the ship's systems, the temperature in the orbital and descent modules in the first days after the incident reached 30 °C (86 °F), and in the service module 40 °C (104 °F), but by January 2023, the temperature in the whole ship had stabilized at about 30 °C.

In December 2022, the outer surface of Soyuz MS-22 was examined using the cameras of the European Robotic Arm and Canadarm2. The analysis of the data received on Earth allowed engineers to detect a possible place of damage on the surface of the service module.

In February 2023, days before undocking, Progress MS-21 encountered a similar problem with coolant pressure leak.

== Undocking and Return ==
As Soyuz MS-22 was unable to perform crew return, it returned uncrewed (like Soyuz 32). MS-23 was launched uncrewed on 24 February 2023 to function as a replacement, bringing back the crew in September 2023 (similar to Soyuz 34). At that point, the crew spent a year in space. The original crew mission of MS-23 was delayed and reassigned to the MS-24 mission. Thus, some dry cargo and equipment weighing 218 kg (481 lb) was brought back on the uncrewed return of Soyuz MS-22. Temperatures probably reached 50 °C (122 °F) on landing, more favourable than the worst emergency crewed landing scenario studied, as reported by the mission control team. More details were published later after analysis.

Until the replacement MS-23 docked to ISS, NASA and Roscosmos considered sending the MS-22 crew home with SpaceX Crew-5 in case of emergency. This is due to the fact that SpaceX originally designed the Crew Dragon to host a crew of seven. Accordingly, the International Space Station mission management team decided to move NASA astronaut Francisco Rubio's Soyuz seat liner from the Soyuz MS-22 spacecraft to Crew Dragon Endurance in order to provide lifeboat capabilities for Rubio. The seat liner was moved on 17 January 2023, with installation and configuration continuing through most of the following day. Seat liner swapping is not new between two Soyuz capsules, but was performed for the first time from Soyuz to Crew Dragon. The change allowed for increased crew protection by reducing the heat load inside the MS-22 spacecraft for cosmonauts Prokopyev and Petelin in the event of an emergency return to Earth. Alongside SpaceX Crew-6 space capsule is designed to bring back crew serving as an emergency evacuation after Crew-5.

MS-23 arrived and docked to the ISS on 26 February 2023. After the spacecraft docked, the seat liners for Sergey Prokopyev and Dmitry Petelin were moved from MS-22 to MS-23 on 2 March ahead of their return in the Soyuz. Rubio's seat liner was transferred from Crew Dragon to the new Soyuz on 6 March.
