= Expedition 7 =

Long-duration mission to the International Space Station

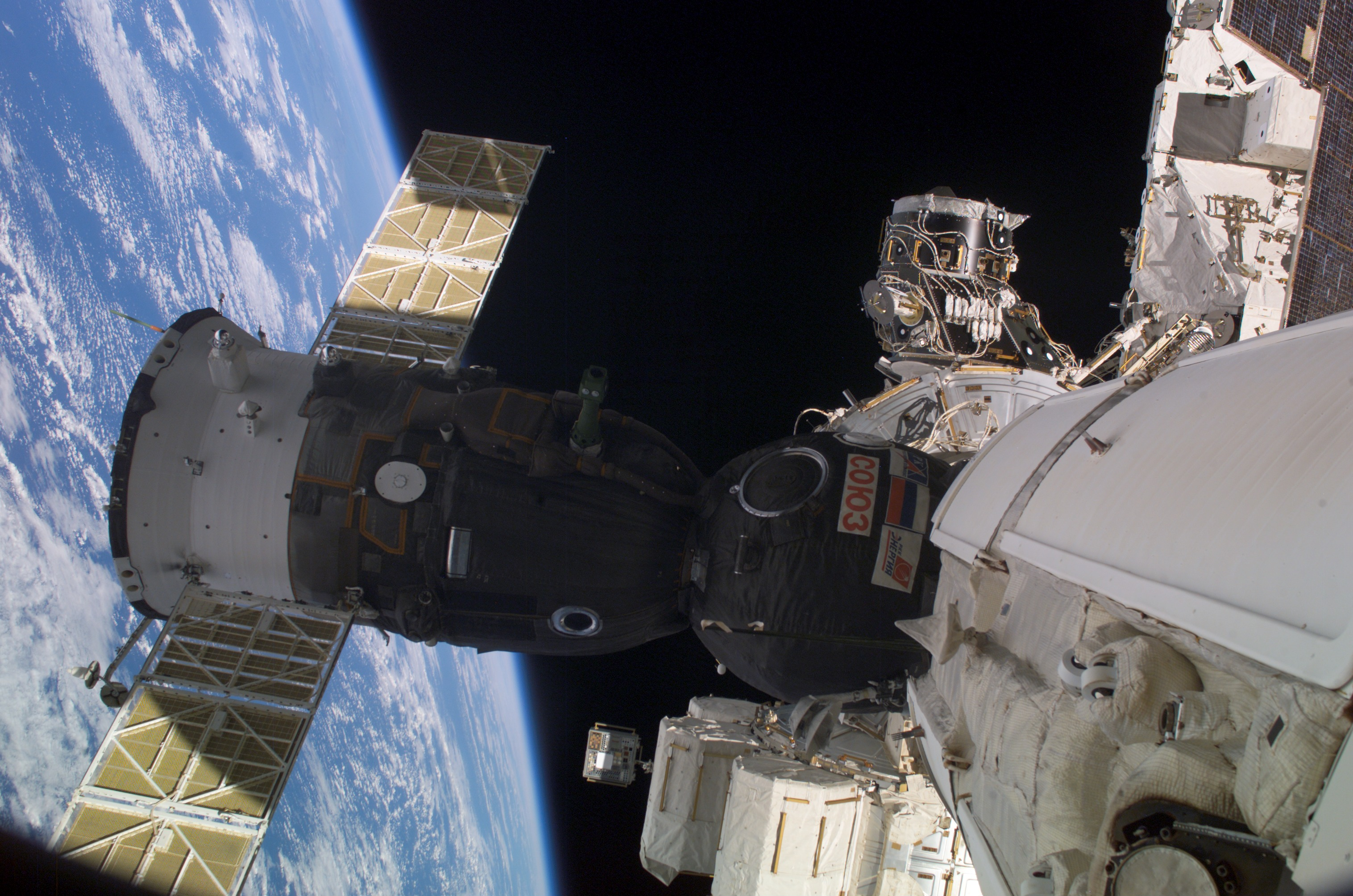
- Soyuz TMA-2 spacecraft, docked to the functional cargo block (FGB) nadir port on the International Space Station.
- Mission type: Long-duration expedition
- Mission duration: 182 days, 16 hours, 20 minutes, 49 seconds (at ISS); 184 days, 22 hours, 46 minutes, 28 seconds (launch to landing)
- Distance travelled: ~123,133,253 kilometres (76,511,456 mi)
- Orbits completed: 2,895

Expedition
- Space station: International Space Station
- Began: 28 April 2003, 05:56:20 UTC
- Ended: 27 October 2003, 22:17:09 UTC
- Arrived aboard: Soyuz TMA-2
- Departed aboard: Soyuz TMA-2

Crew
- Crew size: 2
- Members: Yuri Malenchenko; Ed Lu
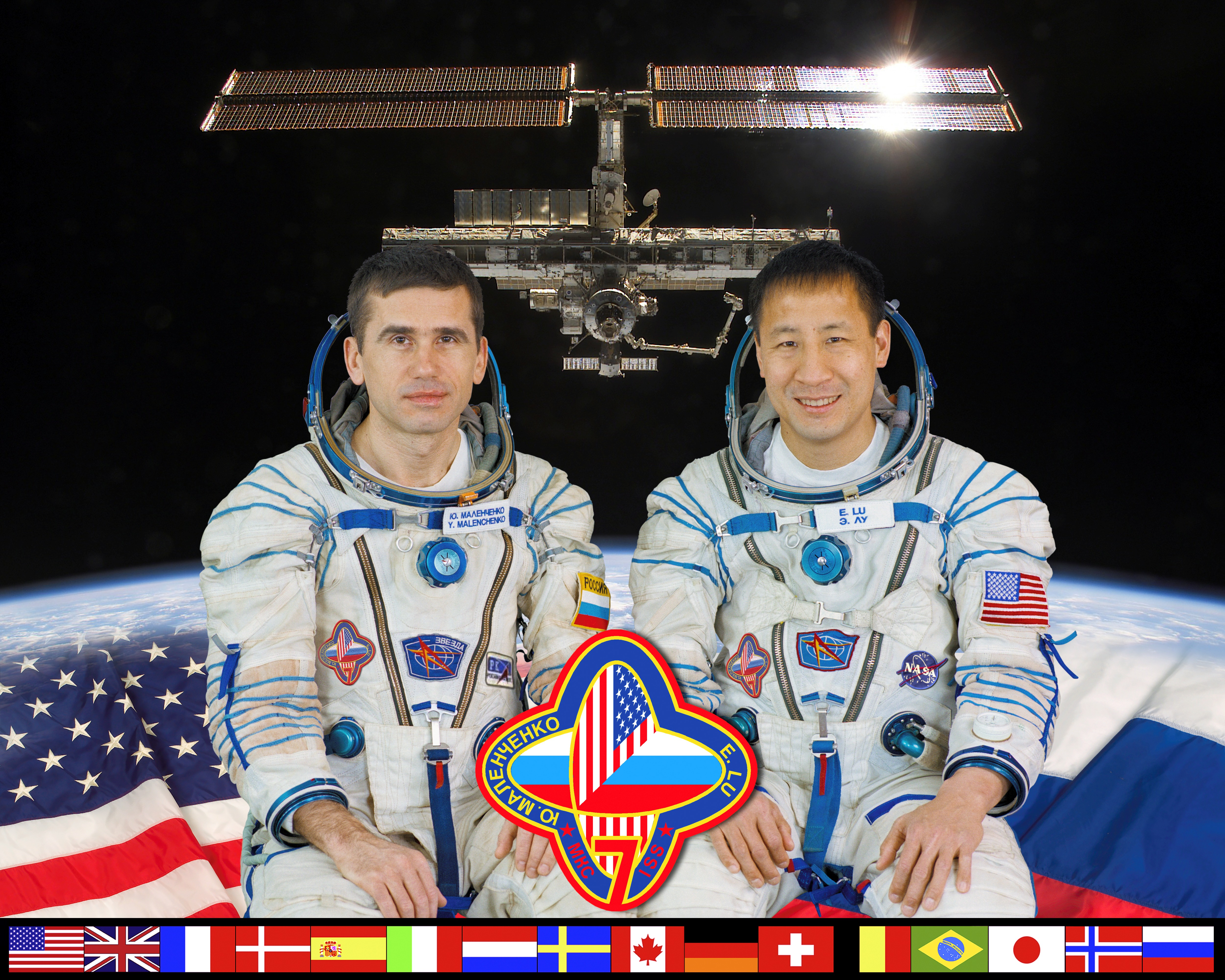
- Expedition 7 mission patch L-R: Yuri Malenchenko and Ed Lu ISS expeditions

Expedition 7 was the seventh expedition to the International Space Station.

== Crew ==
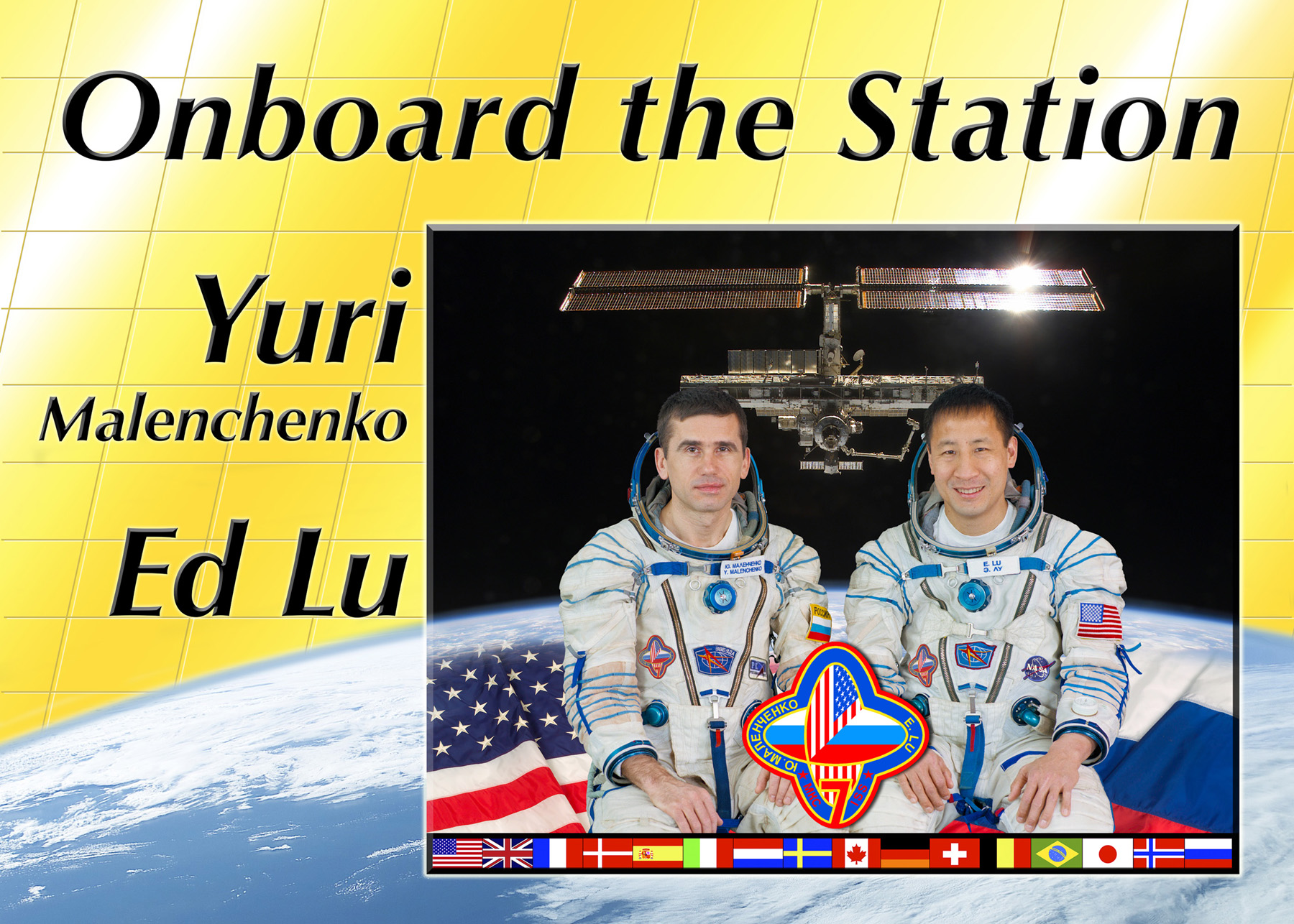
Expedition 7 promotional poster

Prime crew
Position	Crew
Commander	Yuri Malenchenko, RSA; Third spaceflight
Flight Engineer	Ed Lu, NASA; Third and last spaceflight

Backup crew
Position	Crew
Commander	Aleksandr Kaleri, RSA
Flight Engineer	Michael Foale, NASA

=== Planned crew before Columbia disaster ===
Position	Crew
Commander	Yuri Malenchenko, RSA
Flight Engineer	Ed Lu, NASA
Flight Engineer	Aleksandr Kaleri, RSA

== Mission parameters ==
- Perigee: 384 km
- Apogee: 396 km
- Inclination: 51.6°
- Period: 92 min

== Mission objectives ==
The seventh crew of the International Space Station lifted off in Soyuz TMA-2 from the Russian Space Agency's Baikonur Cosmodrome in Kazakhstan on 25 April 2003, at 05:56:20 UTC. The Soyuz docked on 28 April 2003 and took over command of the ISS. The Space Shuttle fleet had been grounded due to the Columbia disaster, so the crew size was reduced to two, as opposed to the three that could be carried by the shuttle. The Expedition Seven crew—along with European Space Agency Astronaut Pedro Duque—landed back on Earth on 27 October 2003 at Kazakhstan at 02:41:20 UTC, after undocking from the International Space Station in their Soyuz spacecraft at 23:17 UTC.

Due to the reduced crew size, the scientific work had to be scaled down as well. Only 15 different experiments were conducted during the mission. Malenchenko and Lu were also tasked with periodic maintenance work on the station, as well as spacewalk training (although no spacewalks were planned). Supplies were delivered by Progress M1-10 in June and Progress M-48 in August.

From Houston, ISS Spacecraft Communicator Mike Fossum informed Expedition 7 Commander Yuri Malenchenko and Science Officer Edward Lu on 15 October 2003 of the successful launch of the Long March rocket carrying the Shenzhou 5 spacecraft and Chinese astronaut Yang Liwei. "It's really some exciting news to share. The world's spacefaring nations have been joined by a new member tonight: China."

"First off, we want to congratulate them," Lu replied. "The more people that go into space, the better off we all are. This is a great achievement and good for everyone in the long run." In Chinese, he later added, "Welcome to space. Have a safe journey."

"I would also like to say I love to have somebody else in space instead of me and Ed," said Malenchenko. "I also know this is great for thousands and thousands of people from China. I congratulate all of them."

Malenchenko and Lu were previously crewmates on the STS-106 shuttle mission and did a spacewalk together during that flight.
