= Yuri Malenchenko =

Russian cosmonaut (born 1961)

- Юрий Маленченко
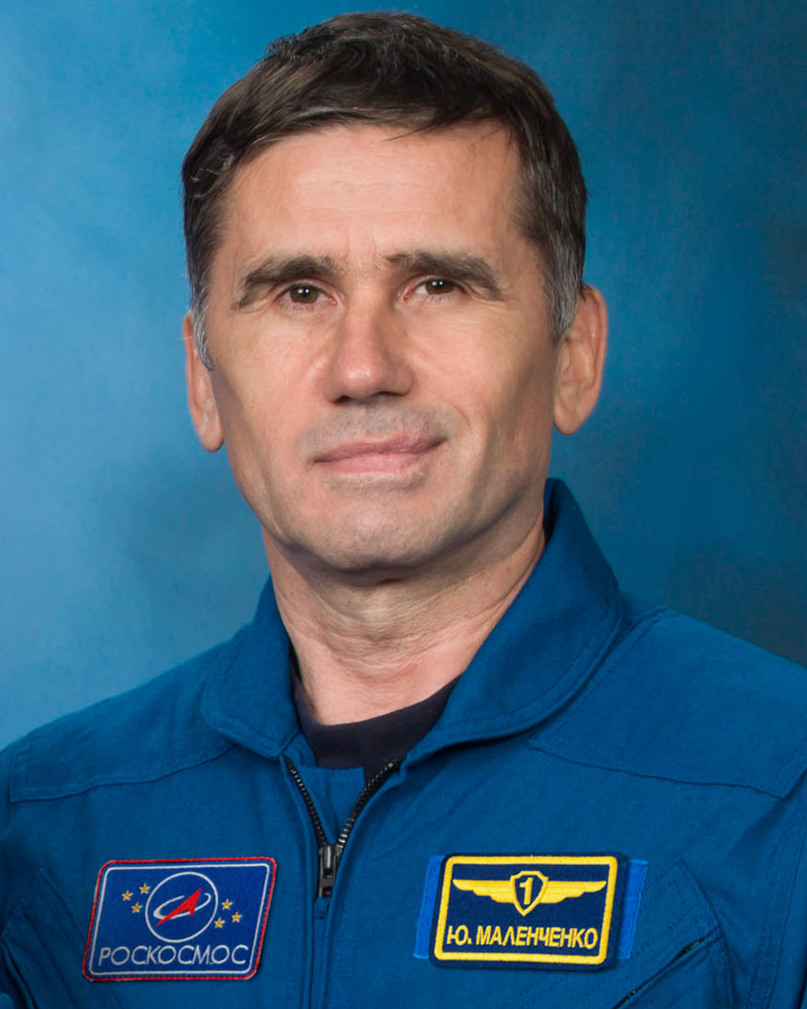
- Malenchenko in 2015
- Born: Yuri Ivanovich Malenchenko; December 22, 1961 (age 64); Khrushchev, Ukrainian SSR, Soviet Union (now Svitlovodsk, Ukraine)
- Education: Kharkiv Military Aviation School; Zhukovsky Air Force Engineering Academy
- Occupation: Fighter pilot
- Awards: Hero of Kazakhstan
- Space career

Roscosmos cosmonaut
- Status: Retired
- Rank: Colonel, Russian Air Force
- Time in space: 827 days, 9 hours, 20 minutes
- Selection: TsPK-8 Cosmonaut Group (1987)
- Total EVAs: 6
- Total EVA time: 34 hours, 52 minutes
- Missions: Soyuz TM-19 (Mir EO-16); STS-106; Soyuz TMA-2 (Expedition 7); Soyuz TMA-11 (Expedition 16); Soyuz TMA-05M (Expedition 32/33); Soyuz TMA-19M (Expedition 46/47)
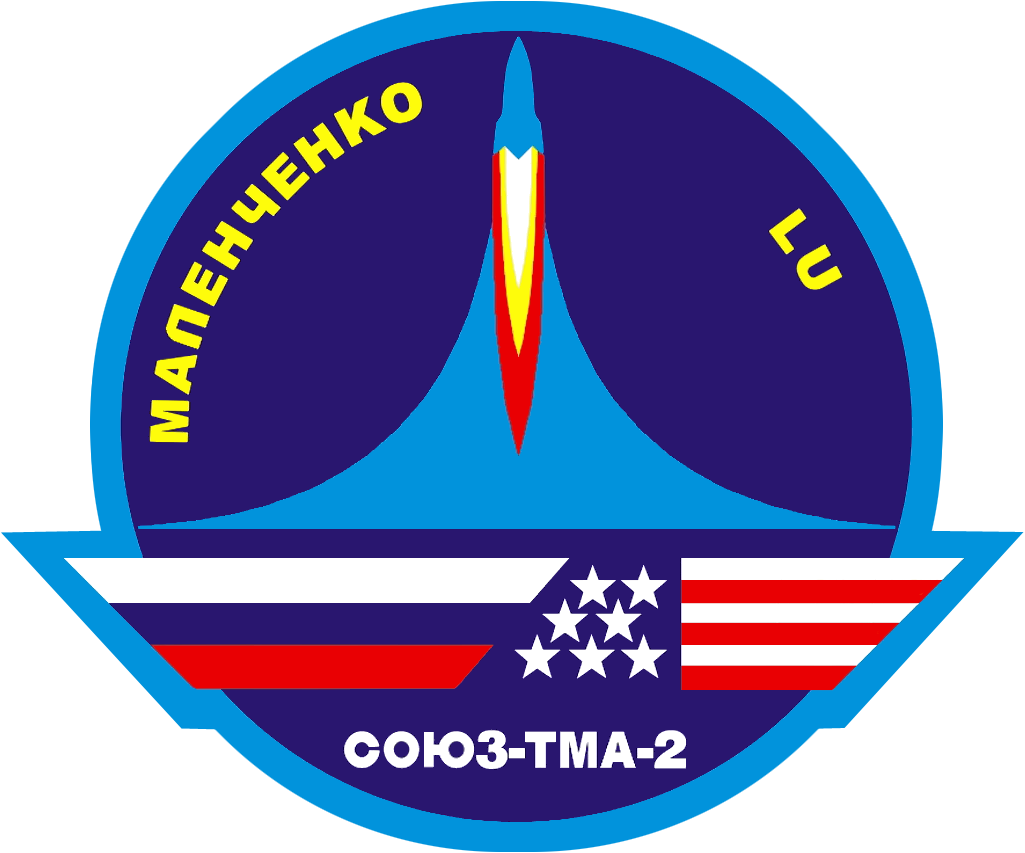
- Mission insignia
- Retired: September 2, 2016

Yuri Ivanovich Malenchenko (Russian: Юрий Иванович Маленченко; born December 22, 1961) is a retired Russian cosmonaut. Malenchenko became the first person to marry in space, on 10 August 2003, when he married Ekaterina Dmitrieva, who was in Texas, while he was 240 miles (390 km) over New Zealand, on the International Space Station. As of December 2023, Malenchenko ranks third for career time in space due to his time on both Mir and the International Space Station (ISS). He is a former commander of the International Space Station.

== Early life ==
Malenchenko was born in Khrushchev, Kirovohrad Oblast, Ukrainian SSR.

== Education ==
Malenchenko graduated from the Kharkiv Military Aviation School in 1983, and attended the Zhukovsky Air Force Engineering Academy, graduating in 1993.

== Awards ==
Malenchenko was awarded:

- Hero of the Russian Federation,
- the National Hero of Kazakhstan medal,
- Military award of excellence,
- Commendation medal,
- Achievement medal,
- Jubilee Medal "70 Years of the Armed Forces of the USSR"
- Meritorious Service Medals 1st, 2nd and 3rd class.

== Cosmonaut career ==
After graduation from the Military Aviation School, he served as a pilot, senior pilot and multi-ship flight lead from 1983 till 1987 in the Odessa Region. In 1987 he was selected as a cosmonaut, and arrived at the Gagarin Cosmonaut Training Center. From December 1987 to June 1989 Malenchenko underwent a course of general space training. After completion of the course, he was qualified as a test-cosmonaut. Between September 1989 to December 1993 he was taking advanced training courses in preparation for spaceflight. In January–July, 1993 Malenchenko trained as commander of the Mir-14 reserve crew. He completed training as a backup commander of the Mir-15 crew from July 1993 to January 1994. From February to June 1994 Malenchenko trained for the Mir-16 mission.

== Spaceflight experience ==
=== Soyuz TM-19 ===
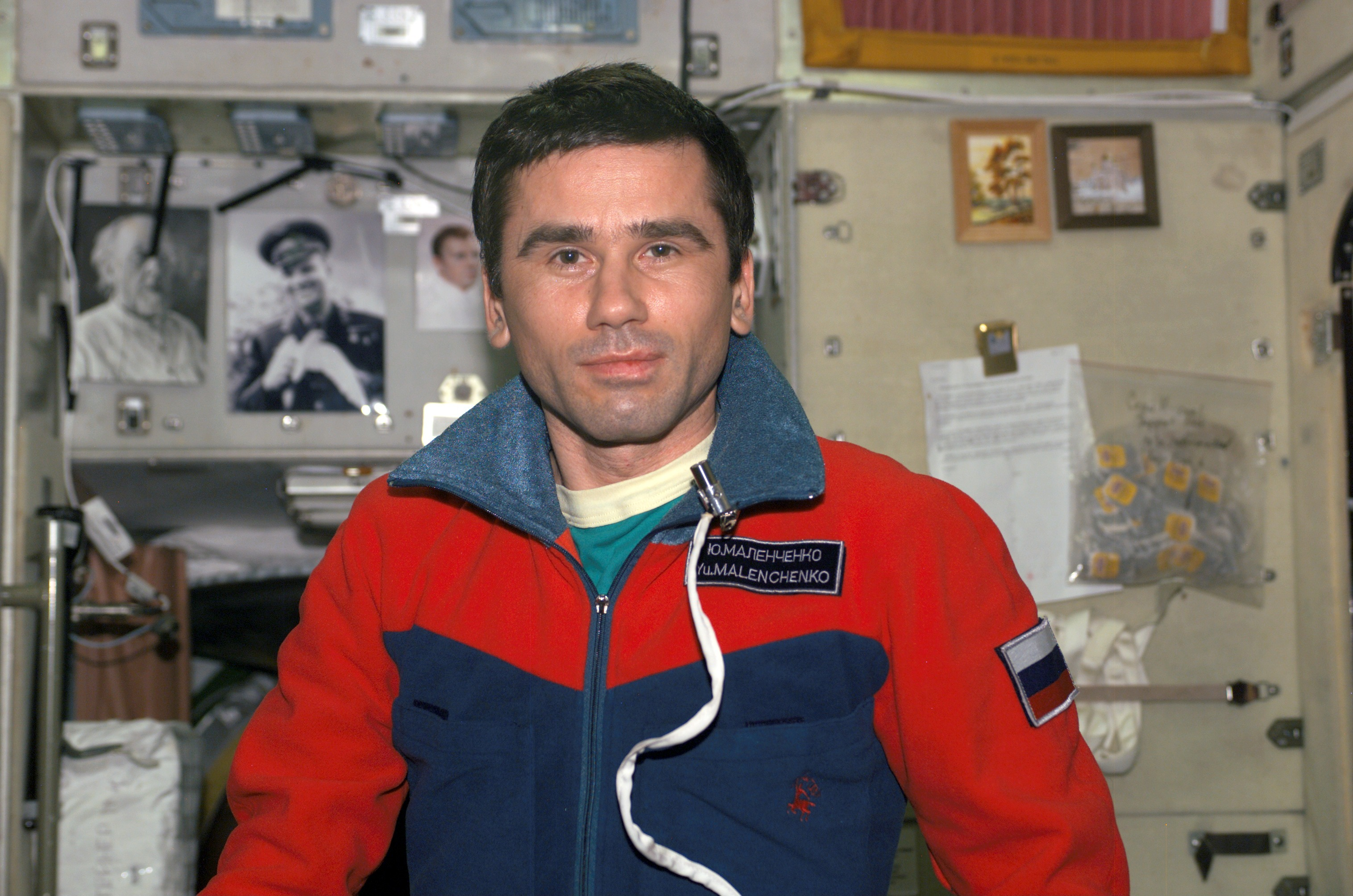
Yuri Malenchenko, Expedition 7 commander inside the Zvezda Module of the ISS.

On July 1, 1994, Malenchenko and Talgat Musabayev lifted off to space on board the Soyuz TM-19 spacecraft with Malenchenko in command of the Soyuz. Following a two-day solo flight the Soyuz docked with Mir on July 3, 1994. Main goal of the mission was the partly exchange of the resident crew. Malenchenko, Musabayev and cosmonaut Valeri Polyakov became the 16th resident Mir crew, with Malenchenko in command. The crew conducted medical experiments and experiments in materials science. There were many problems during the mission, which finally ended with the first successful manual docking of a Progress supply ship at Mir by Malenchenko. On November 4, 1994, Malenchenko, Musabayev and Ulf Merbold returned to Earth aboard their Soyuz capsule after landing 88 km northeast of Arkalyk. Aboard Soyuz TM-19 and Mir complex Malenchenko spent 125 days, 22 hours, 53 minutes in space.

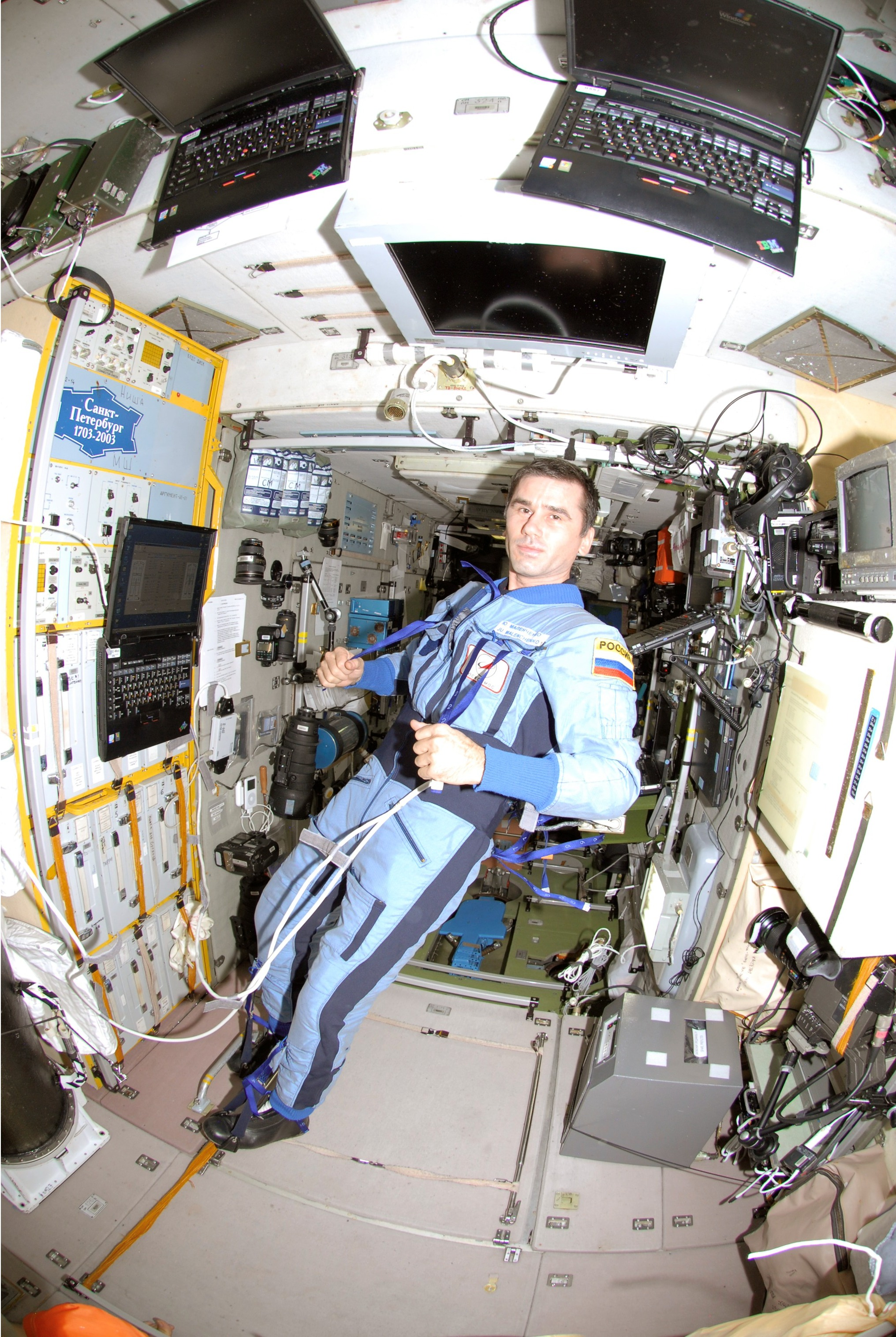
Yuri Malenchenko, Expedition 16 Flight Engineer inside the Zvezda Module of the ISS.

=== STS-106 ===
Malenchenko served as a mission specialist for STS-106. Space Shuttle Atlantis lifted off from the Kennedy Space Center (KSC) on September 8, 2000. On flight day two, Atlantis completed a successful rendezvous and docking with the ISS. The objectives of the mission were to bring supplies to the International Space Station (ISS) and to prepare the Zvezda Service Module for the arrival of the first resident crew. During the 12-day mission, the shuttle crew spent a week inside the ISS unloading supplies from both a double SPACEHAB cargo module in the rear of Atlantis's cargo bay and from Progress M1-3 which was docked to the aft docking port of Zvezda. After circling the globe for 186 orbits, Atlantis landed on September 19, 2000, at Runway 15, KSC. The mission lasted 11 days, 19 hours and 12 minutes.

=== Expedition 7 ===
Malenchenko with astronaut Edward Lu lifted on board the Soyuz TMA-2 spacecraft from the Baikonur Cosmodrome on April 26, 2003, to the ISS. The spacecraft docked with the ISS on April 28, 2003. Malenchenko served as the Soyuz commander, and after docking with the ISS they exchanged with the resident crew on board ISS and became the seventh station crew, Expedition 7. He was the commander of the Expedition 7, and during his stay on the station, Malenchenko became the first person to get married in space. Soyuz TMA-2 returned to Earth on October 28, with both the Expedition 7 crew as well as Pedro Duque on board. The spacecraft landed at 02:40 UTC near Arkalyk. Aboard Soyuz TMA-2 and the ISS, Malenchenko spent 184 days, 22 hours and 46 minutes in space.

=== Expedition 16 ===
Malenchenko with NASA astronaut Peggy Whitson and Malaysian spaceflight participant Sheikh Muszaphar Shukor blasted off to space on October 10, 2007, on Soyuz TMA-11 from the Baikonour Cosmodrome. He served as the Soyuz commander. The Soyuz spacecraft docked with the ISS after 2 days of autonomous flight on October 12, 2007. Malenchenko joined the ISS Expedition 16 crew as flight engineer 1. The Soyuz capsule landed in Kazakhstan on April 19, 2008, bringing back Malenchenko, Whitson and South Korean spaceflight participant Yi So-Yeon. Similar to Soyuz TMA-1 and Soyuz TMA-10, Soyuz TMA-11 performed a ballistic reentry, a reentry steeper than a normal reentry, due to a malfunction and landed 475 km from intended landing point, north of Arkalyk. Although the crew were recovered with no injuries, the spacecraft's hatch and antenna suffered burn damage during the unusual reentry.

He accumulated 191 days, 19 hours and 8 minutes time in space during Soyuz TMA-11 and ISS Expedition 16 missions.

=== Spacewalks ===
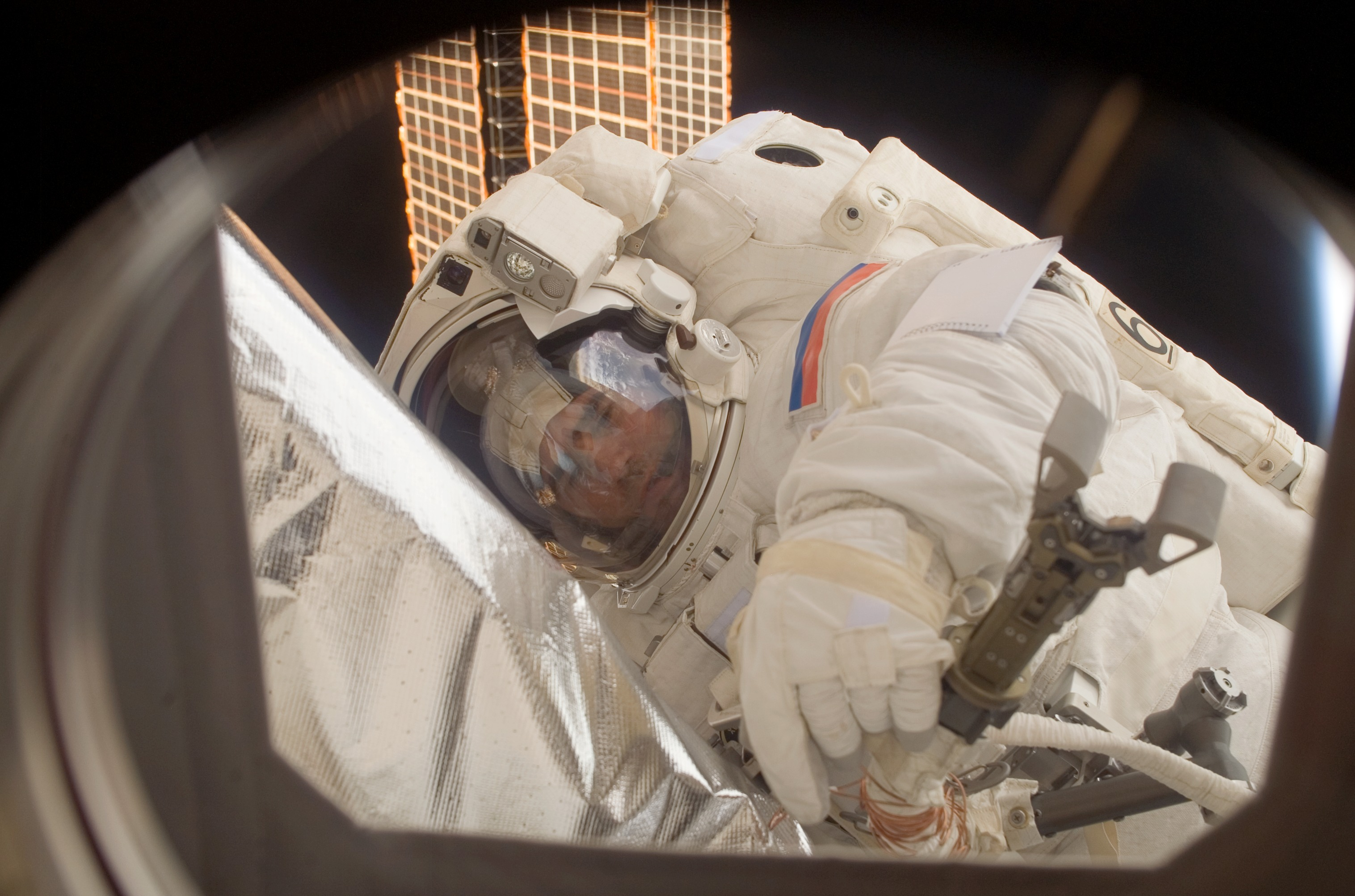
Expedition 16 flight engineer Yuri Malenchenko participates in a spacewalk.

Malenchenko conducted his first and second career spacewalks during the Mir-16 mission. He and Musabayev performed two spacewalks on September 9, 1994 (5h 06m) and September 14, 1994, in which the station's external insulation was repaired. The first and second spacewalks lasted 5 hours and 6 minutes, and 6 hours and 1 minute respectively.

Malenchenko performed his third career spacewalk during the STS-106 mission to the ISS. On flight day three, Malenchenko and NASA astronaut Ed Lu conducted a 6-hour and 14 minute space walk. The spacewalk started at 04:55 GMT on September 11 when the two spacewalkers exited the shuttle's airlock. The spacewalk's objective focused on routing and connecting nine power, data and communications cables between the Zvezda module and the Zarya module, as well as installing the six-foot-long magnetometer to the ISS to serve as a compass showing the space station in respect to the Earth. This spacewalk marked the sixth spacewalk in support of the ISS assembly and the 50th spacewalk in space shuttle history.

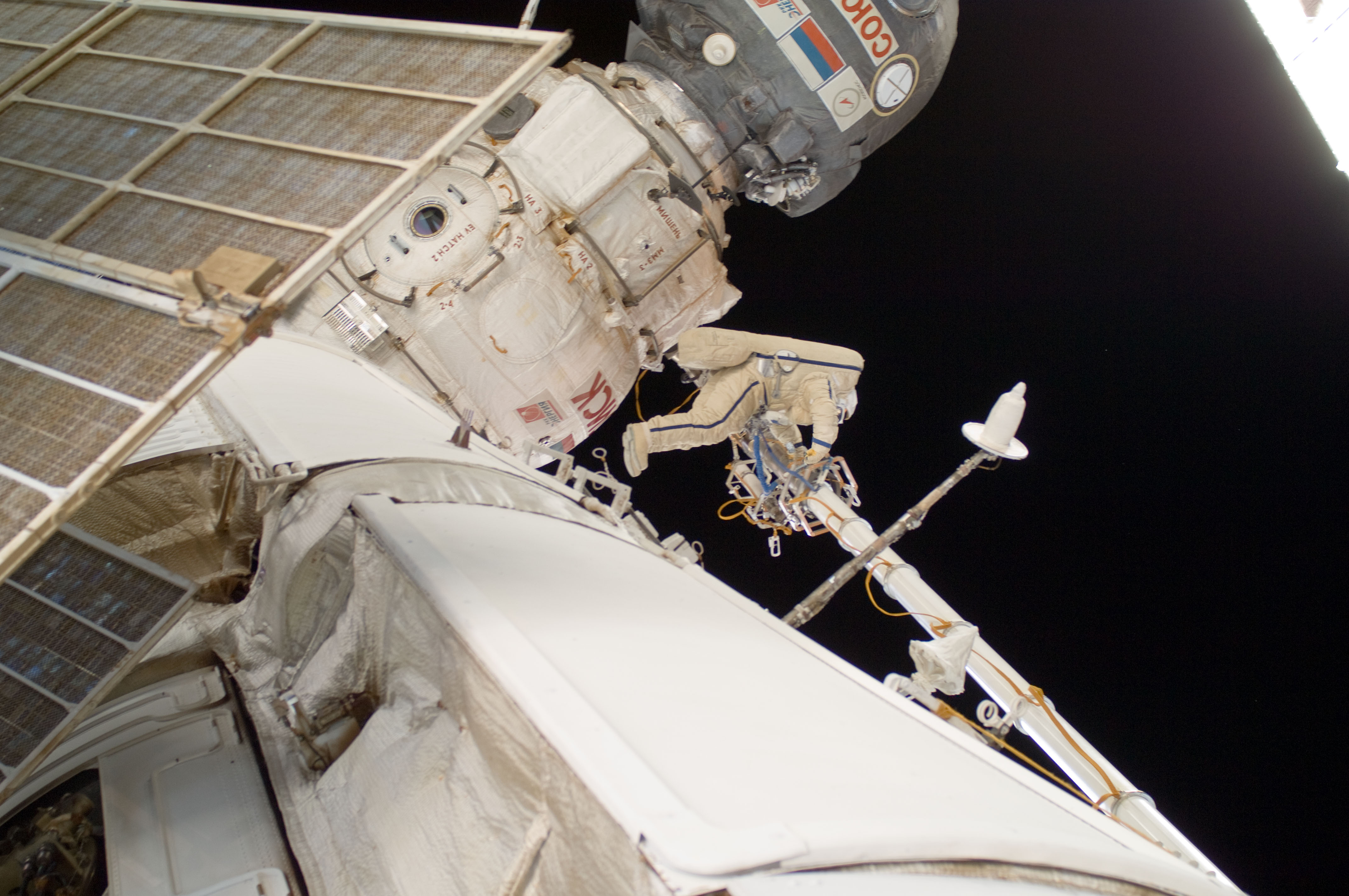
Expedition 32 flight engineer Malenchenko participates in a spacewalk on 20 August 2012.

On November 9, 2007, Malenchenko performed his fourth career spacewalk. He and Expedition 16 commander, Peggy Whitson, in US EMUs ventured into space from the station's Quest airlock at 09:54 UTC. Malenchenko's suit was all white, and the purpose of the spacewalk was to prepare for the relocation of Pressurized Mating Adapter (PMA-2) and the subsequent move of the Harmony node to its permanent location. As the first task, the two spacewalkers disconnected the Station to Shuttle Power Transfer System (SSPTS) cables between the Destiny laboratory and PMA-2. Next they disconnected eight other cables between PMA-2 and the Destiny. Malenchenko removed and replaced a failed electrical circuit box and together with Whitson removed the active Common Berthing Mechanism cover that was located at the outboard end of Harmony. Next, Malenchenko moved back behind the Z1 truss to reconfigure a power system, removing an electrical jumper. The spacewalk ended at 16.49 UTC when the two spacewalkers returned to the ISS. The spacewalk lasted 6 hours and 55 minutes.

On 20 August 2012, Malenchenko together with cosmonaut Gennady Padalka participated in his fifth career spacewalk. Tasks assigned to the two cosmonauts included hardware relocations, installations, retrievals, and deployments. For the spacewalk, Malenchenko donned an Orlan spacesuit with the blue stripe. The duration of the spacewalk was 5 hours and 51 minutes. The spacewalk was delayed for about an hour due to a small leak between Space Station modules. The spacewalk started from the Pirs Docking Compartment Module at 15:37 GMT. The first task for Padalka and Malenchenko was to relocate the Strela-2 boom from the Pirs module to the forward end of the Zarya module. The relocation was needed since Pirs module will be detached from the Space Station in the future for the arrival of the new Multi-purpose Laboratory Module (MLM) Nauka. The next task completed by Padalka and Malenchenko was to deploy a 21-inch diameter spherical satellite. The two cosmonauts also retrieved five debris shields from the Pirs Module, prior to installing them on the Zvezda Module. They also completed several get-ahead tasks (since they both opted not to take rests during the night passes) as the duo were about an hour ahead of the timeline. They retrieved an external experiment called Biorisk from the Pirs Module for return to Earth, and for added stability installed two structural support struts between the Pirs Module and the EVA ladder. Padalka and Malenchenko then both ingress the Pirs Module, prior to closing the hatch and beginning the re-pressurisation procedure, to end a highly successful spacewalk.

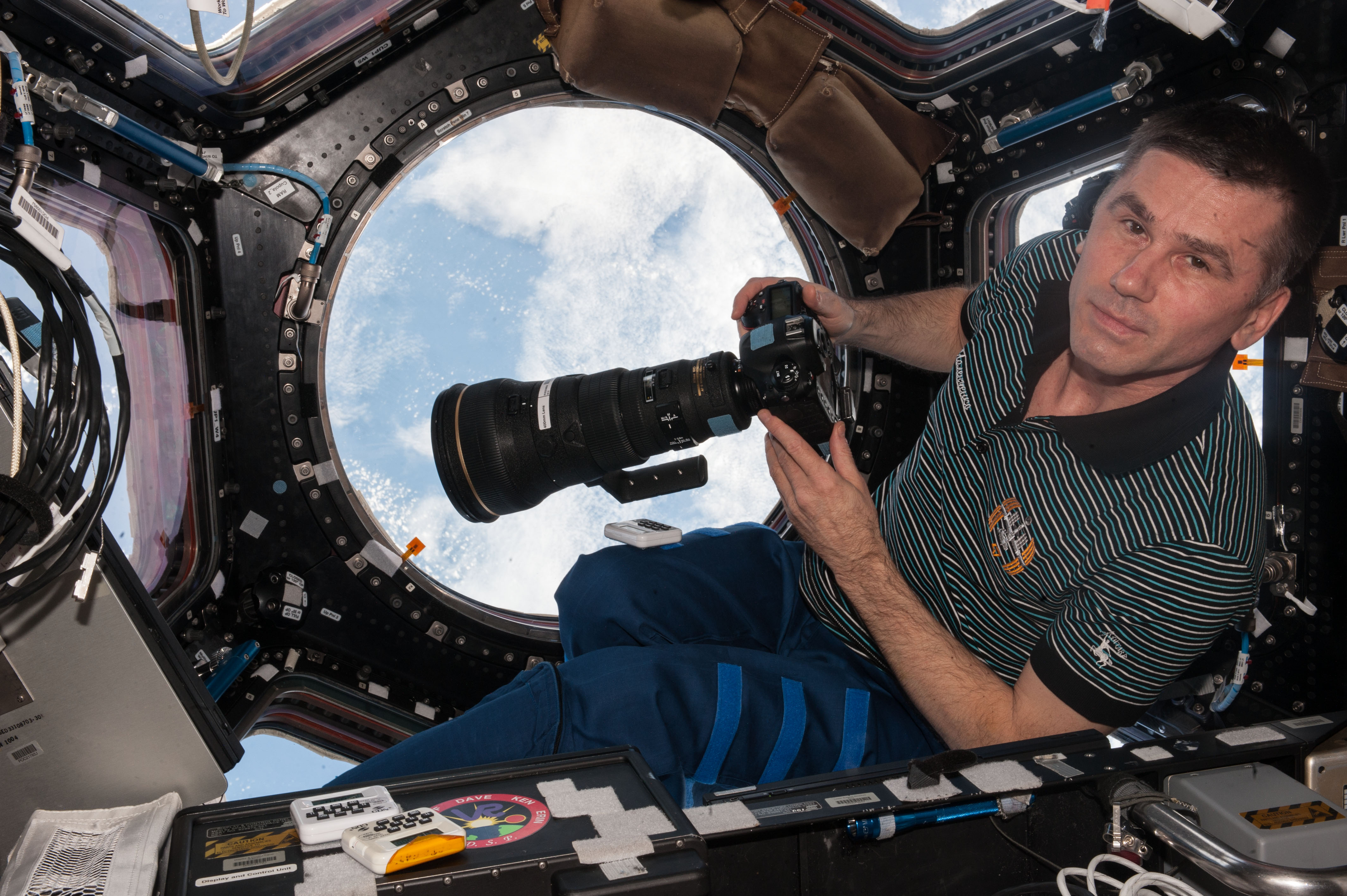
Yuri Malenchenko in the Cupola module during Expedition 47.

=== Expedition 46/47 ===
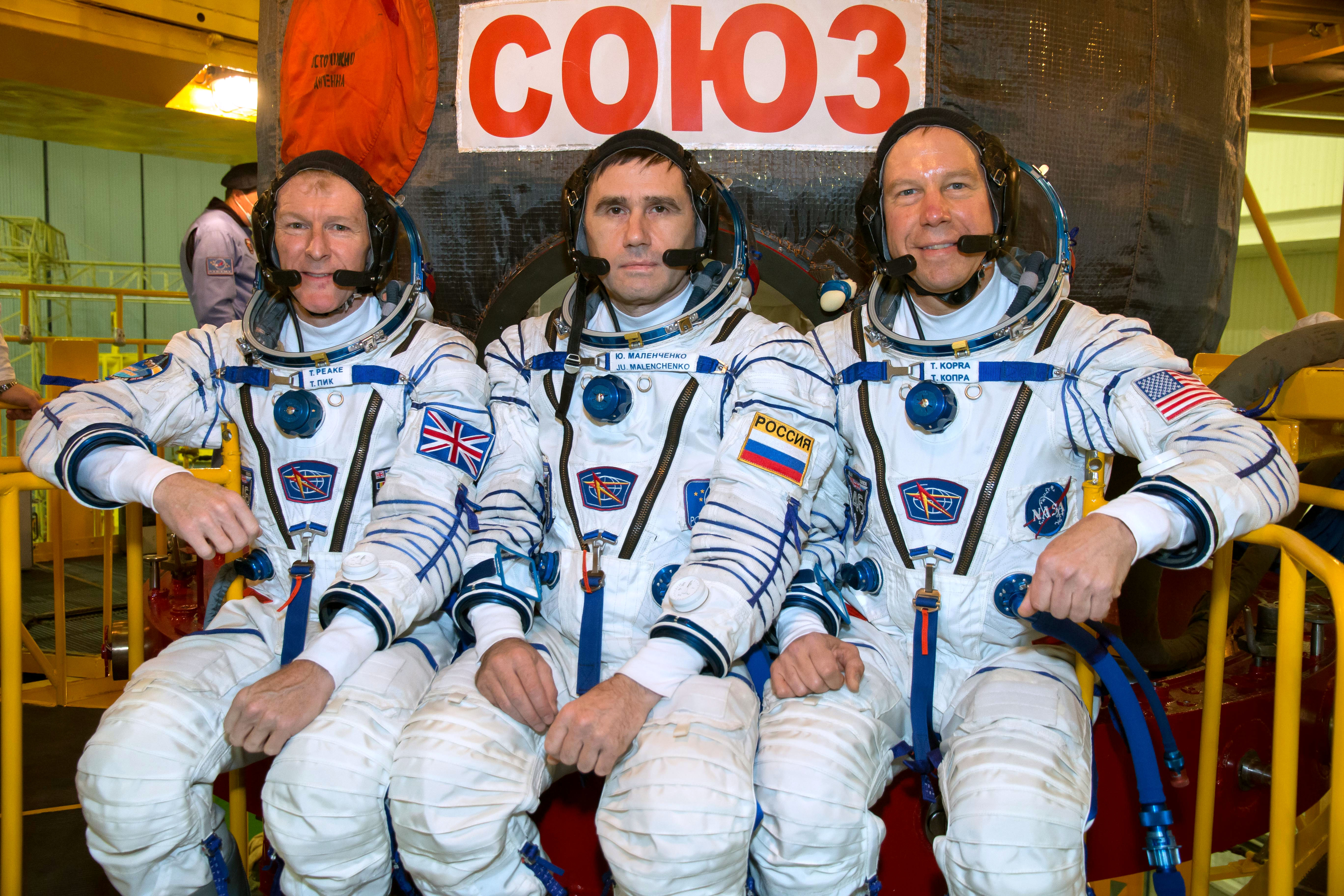
The Soyuz TMA-19M crew during a fit check

Malenchenko arrived at the ISS Soyuz TMA-19M to join the Expedition 46 crew. He performed a manual docking due to a malfunction in the automatic docking system. Progress MS-1 was then scheduled for launch to the ISS, atop a Soyuz 2.1a, on 21 December. Planned for a launch date of no earlier than 7 February 2016, the SpaceX CRS-8 mission provided the ISS with the Bigelow Expandable Activity Module. Two EVAs were performed during Expedition 46. He returned to Earth on Soyuz TMA-19M, and landed on 18 June 2016 09:15 UTC, after spending additional 186 days in space.

== Personal life ==
Malenchenko married Ekaterina (Kat) Dmietrieva on August 10, 2003. They have one child.

=== Wedding ===
Malenchenko became the first person to marry in space, joining by video from the International Space Station as Kat walked down the aisle. The wedding on Earth took place at the Johnson Space Center in Texas, where law permits marriage with one party present. Kat called the romance a "celestial, soulful connection".

Despite initial resistance, Russian officials eventually approved of the space wedding, though air force chief Vladimir Mikhailov reportedly said "a cosmonaut mustn't behave like a movie star."

Malenchenko's parents were confused. His mother said, "What is this needed for — a sensation for the whole world?" according to his father, who appeared on the Russian TV channel Rossiya.

== See also ==
- List of Heroes of the Russian Federation
