= Soyuz TMA-2 =

2003 Russian crewed spaceflight to the ISS

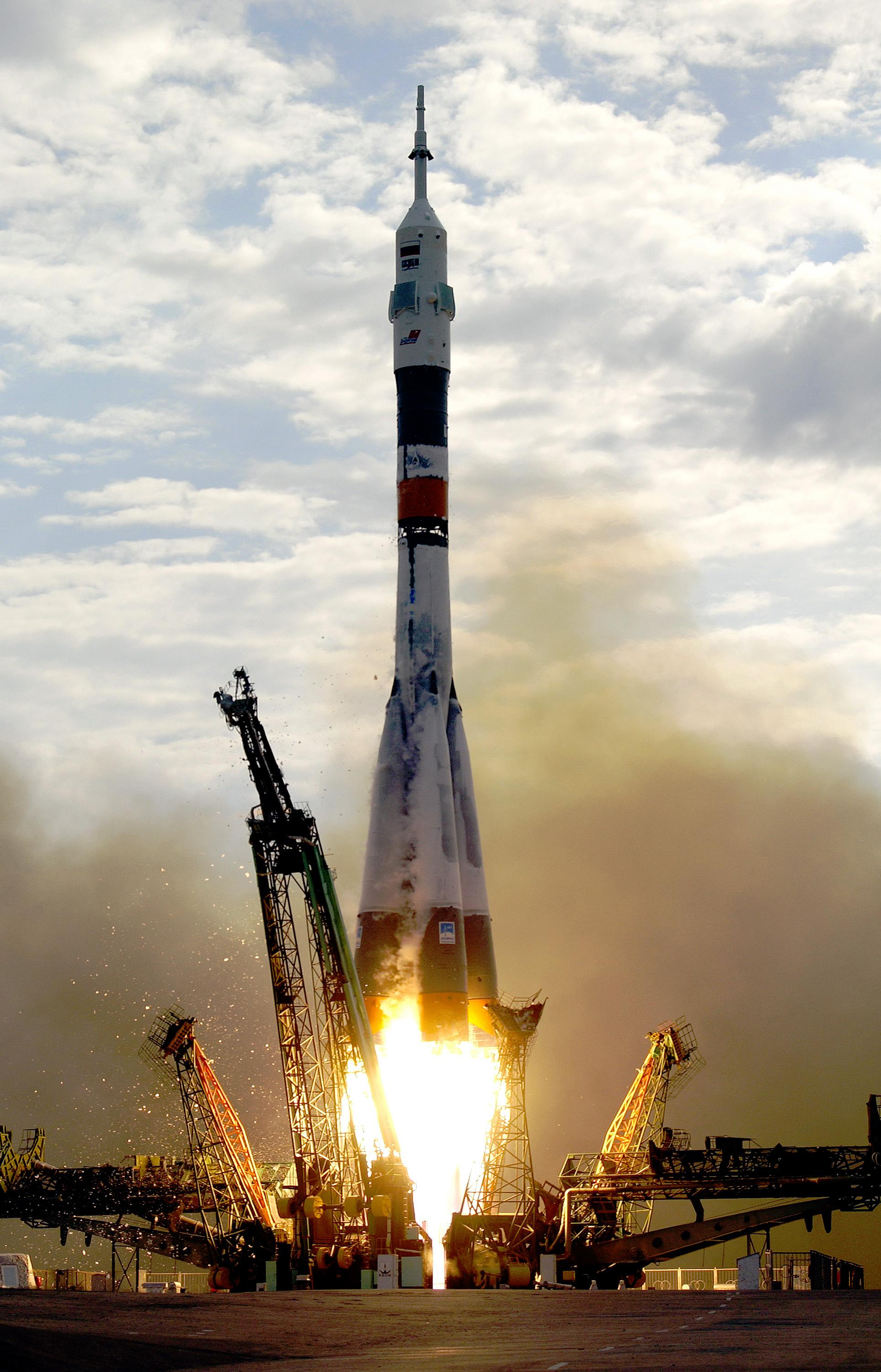
- Soyuz TMA-2 launch
- Mission type: ISS crew transport
- Operator: Russian Space Agency
- COSPAR ID: 2003-016A
- SATCAT no.: 27781
- Mission duration: 184 days, 22 hours, 46 minutes, 28 seconds
- Orbits completed: ~3,005

Spacecraft properties
- Spacecraft: Soyuz-TMA 11F732
- Spacecraft type: Soyuz-TMA
- Manufacturer: Energia
- Launch mass: 7,136 kilograms (15,732 lb)

Crew
- Crew size: 2 up 3 down
- Members: Yuri Malenchenko; Edward Tsang Lu
- Landing: Pedro Duque
- Callsign: Agat (Agate)

Start of mission
- Launch date: April 26, 2003, 03:53:52 UTC
- Rocket: Soyuz-FG
- Launch site: Baikonur, Site 1/5
- Contractor: Progress

End of mission
- Landing date: October 28, 2003, 02:40:20 UTC
- Landing site: Near Arkalyk; 49°55′N 66°57′E

Orbital parameters
- Reference system: Geocentric
- Regime: Low Earth
- Perigee altitude: 200 kilometres (120 mi)
- Apogee altitude: 242 kilometres (150 mi)
- Inclination: 51.67 degrees

Docking with ISS
- Docking port: Zarya nadir
- Docking date: 28 April 2003; 05:56 UTC
- Undocking date: 27 October 2003; 23:17 UTC
- Time docked: 182d 17h 21m
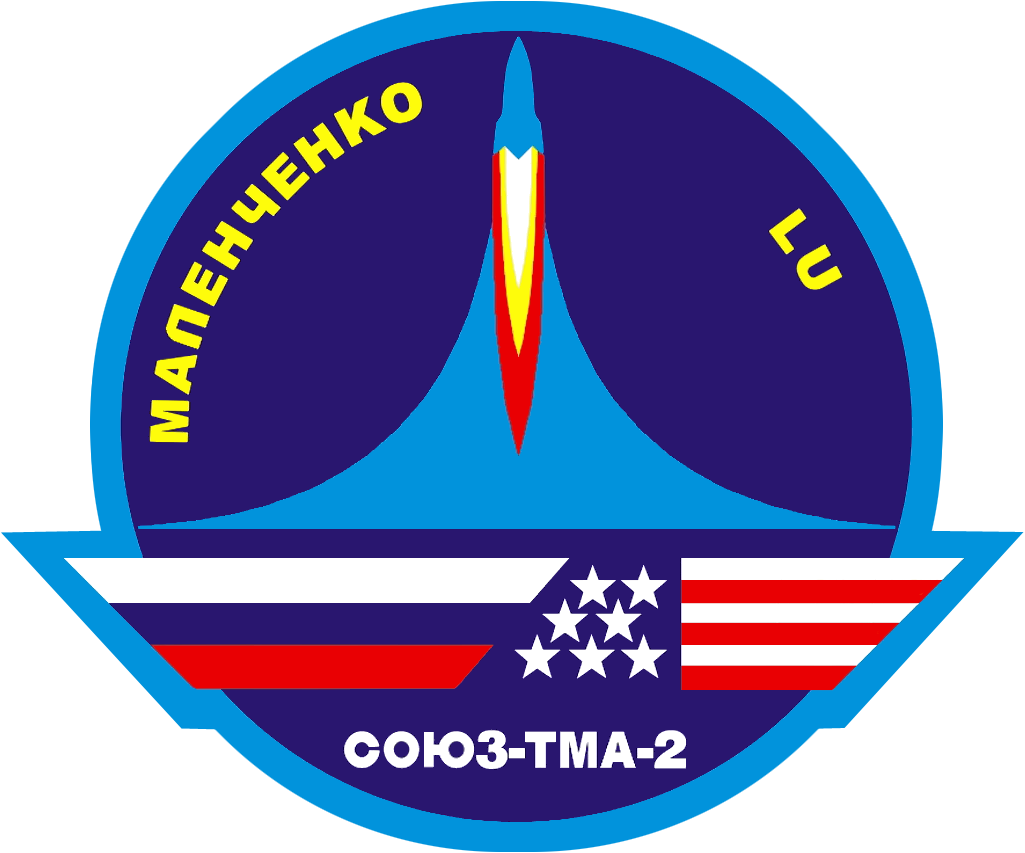
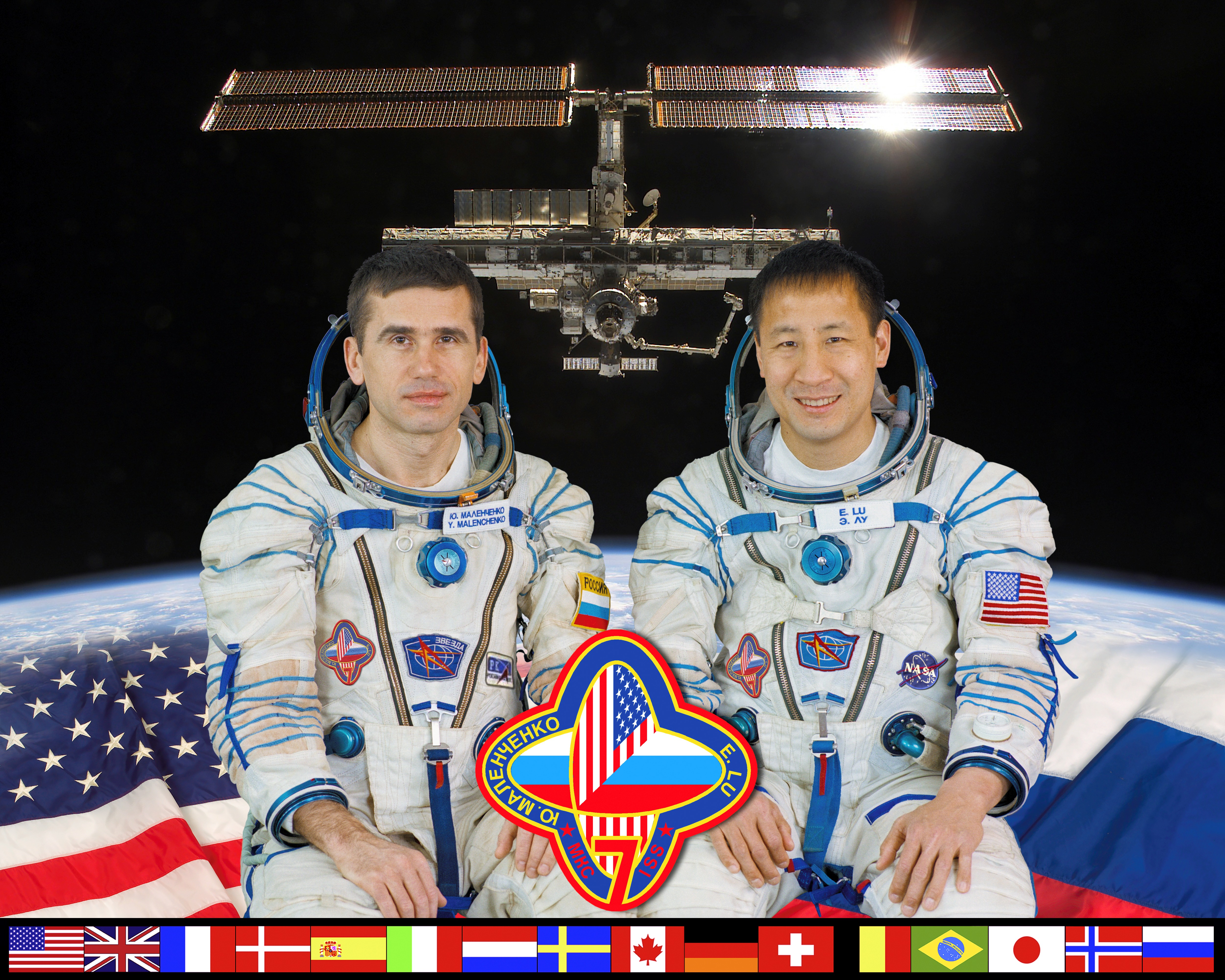
- Yuri Ivanovich Malenchenko (left) and Edward Tsang Lu Soyuz programme (Crewed missions)

Soyuz TMA-2 was a Soyuz (Russian Союз ТМА-2, Union TMA-2) mission to the International Space Station (ISS) launched by a Soyuz FG launch vehicle. The spacecraft docked with the ISS on April 28, 2003 and undocked on October 28, 2003. Soyuz TMA-2 was the second flight for the TMA modification of the Soyuz spacecraft, and the 6th Soyuz to fly to the ISS.

The commander was Yuri Ivanovich Malenchenko (Russia), and the flight engineer was Edward Tsang Lu (USA). After docking with the ISS they exchanged with the resident crew on ISS and became the seventh station crew, called "ISS Expedition Seven". Alexander Kaleri and Michael Foale were assigned as the backup crew.

== Crew ==
| Position | Launching crew | Landing crew |
|---|---|---|
| Commander | (Russia) Yuri Malenchenko, RSA; Expedition 7 Third spaceflight | |
| Flight Engineer | (United States) Edward Tsang Lu, NASA; Expedition 7 Third and last spaceflight | |
| Flight Engineer | None | (Spain) Pedro Duque, ESA; Second and Last spaceflight |

== Original Crew ==
| Position | Crew |
|---|---|
| Commander | (Russia) Gennady Padalka, RSA; N/A (Taxi Flight); Second spaceflight |
| Flight Engineer | (Spain) Pedro Duque, ESA; N/A (Taxi Flight); Second and last spaceflight |
| Flight Engineer | (Russia) Oleg Kotov; N/A (Taxi Flight); First spaceflight |

== Mission parameters ==
- Mass: 7136 kg
- Perigee: 200 km
- Apogee: 250 km
- Inclination: 51.7°
- Period: 88.7 min

=== Docking with ISS ===
- Docked to ISS: April 28, 2003, 05:56 UTC (to nadir port of Zarya)
- Undocked from ISS: October 27, 2003, 23:17 UTC (from nadir port of Zarya)

== Mission highlights ==
Originally the Soyuz missions to the ISS were all planned to be only taxi mission to deliver a new Soyuz spacecraft as the station's lifeboat every six month with a visiting crew, but not for crew exchange. Until the Space Shuttle Columbia disaster, the same was planned for Soyuz TMA-2, a visiting crew consisting of commander Gennady Padalka and ESA-astronaut Pedro Duque were to spend about one week at the station and then return with the previous Soyuz TMA-1 spacecraft. The third seat might have gone to the Chilean Klaus von Storch as a Chilean space agency (Agencia Chilena del Espacio) cosmonaut, but even before the Columbia disaster, it looked like his flight would not happen, and the seat would go to the Russian cosmonaut Oleg Kotov or to deliver freight to the station.

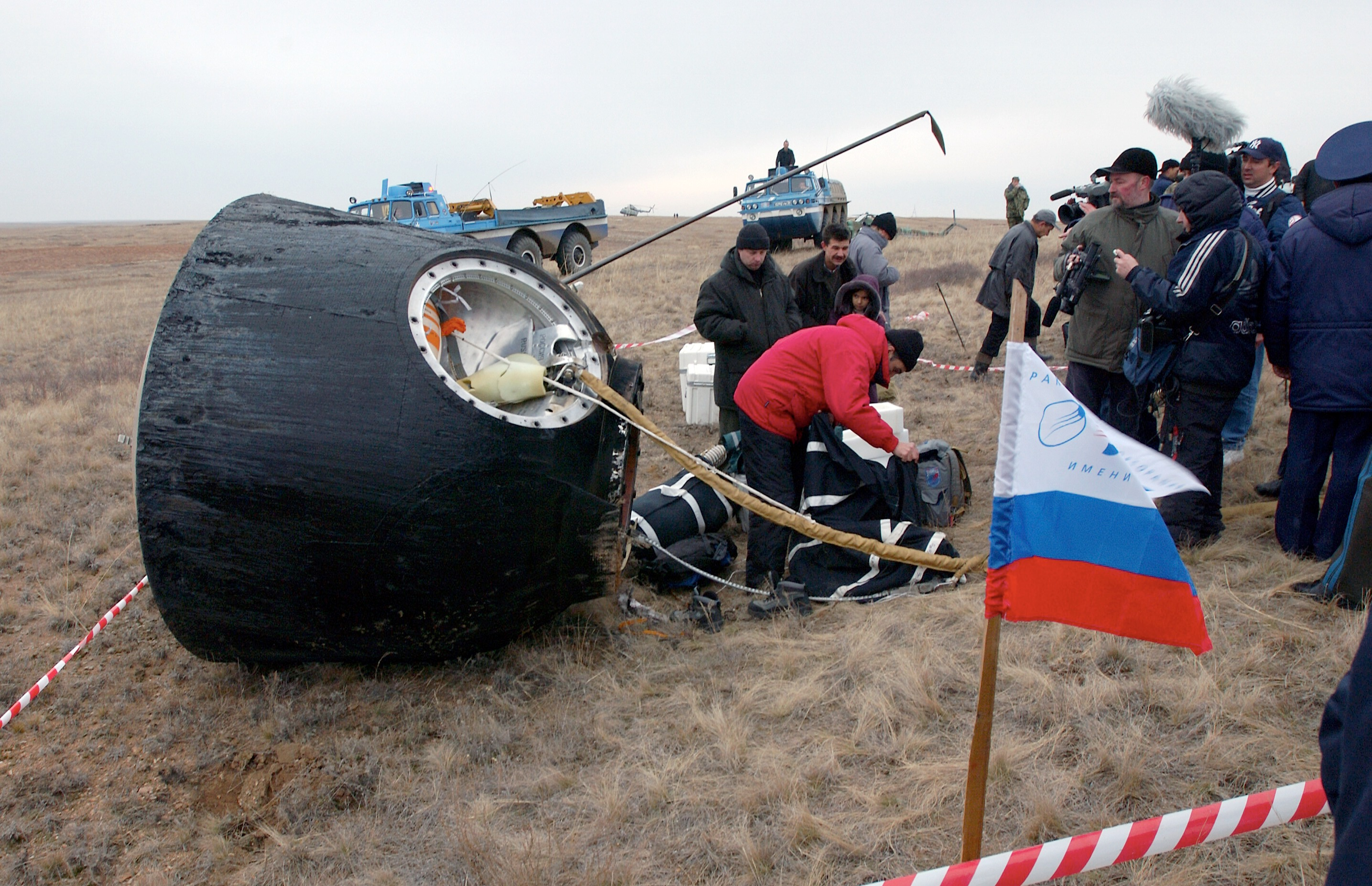
Soyuz TMA-2 landing

During his stay on the station, Malenchenko became the first person to get married in space. His bride was in Texas where long distance marriages are legal.

The spacecraft returned to Earth on October 28, with both the "Expedition 7" crew as well as Pedro Duque on board. Duque was launched with Soyuz TMA-3 and spent only one week on board of the ISS.
