= Ed Lu =

American physicist and astronaut (born 1963)

- 盧傑
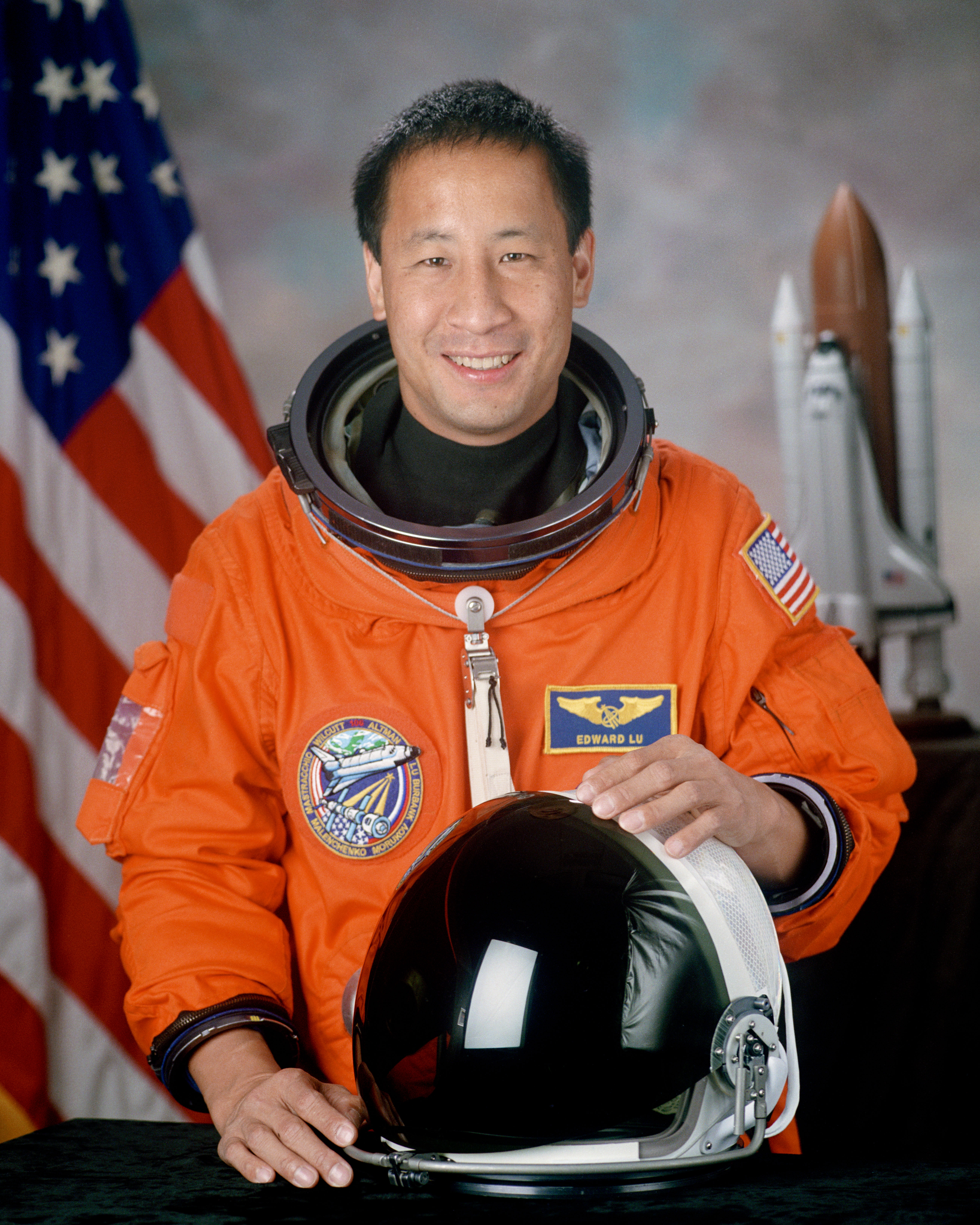
- Lu in 2000
- Born: Edward Tsang Lu; July 1, 1963 (age 63); Springfield, Massachusetts, U.S.
- Education: Cornell University (BS); Stanford University (MS, PhD)
- Space career

NASA astronaut
- Time in space: 205d 23h 18m
- Selection: NASA Group 15 (1994)
- Total EVAs: 1
- Total EVA time: 6h, 14m
- Missions: STS-84; STS-106; Soyuz TMA-2 (Expedition 7)
- Scientific career
- Fields: Solar physics Astrophysics
- Thesis: The Evolution of Energetic Particles and the Emitted Radiation in Solar Flares (1989)
- Doctoral advisor: Vahe Petrosian

Chinese name
- Traditional Chinese: 盧傑
- Simplified Chinese: 卢杰
Transcriptions
Standard Mandarin
- Hanyu Pinyin: Lú Jié

Edward Tsang Lu (Chinese: 盧傑; pinyin: Lú Jié; born July 1, 1963) is an American physicist and former NASA astronaut. He flew on two Space Shuttle flights and one Soyuz flight, and made an extended stay aboard the International Space Station.

In 2007, Lu retired from NASA to become the program manager of Google's Advanced Projects Team. In 2002, while still at NASA, Lu co-founded the B612 Foundation, dedicated to protecting the Earth from asteroid strikes, later serving as its chairman. As of 2020, he is its executive director.

== Early life and education ==
Lu was born in Springfield, Massachusetts and raised in Webster, New York.

Lu attended R. L. Thomas High School, where he was a member of the wrestling team and graduated in 1980. After high school, Lu graduated from Cornell University, where he earned his Bachelor of Science (B.S.) in electrical engineering and was a member of Pi Kappa Phi. He then earned a Master of Science (M.S.) and a Ph.D. in applied physics from Stanford University in 1989 as a fellow of the National Science Foundation.

Lu became a specialist in solar physics and did postdoctoral work at the High Altitude Observatory in Boulder, Colorado and the Institute for Astronomy in Honolulu, Hawaii before being selected for the NASA Astronaut Corps in 1994.

== NASA career ==
Lu flew on Space Shuttle missions STS-84 in 1997 and STS-106 in 2000, in which he carried out a six-hour spacewalk to perform construction work on the International Space Station. Having been flight engineer on Soyuz TMA-2, Lu spent six months in space in 2003 as part of ISS Expedition 7, with cosmonaut Yuri Malenchenko.

In July 2003, Lu and Malenchenko answered questions from students participating in Japan's NASDA special educational event, where Ed Lu performed "Happy Birthday" on an electronic piano for a student's birthday in the live broadcast from space. He had demonstrated the difficulty of playing the piano instrument in space during a live in-orbit interview with CBS News and NASA TV video feed. Also on this ISS mission on October 15, 2003, Lu communicated with the crewman of China's first crewed mission into space, Yang Liwei, flying aboard Shenzhou 5. Lu congratulated the Chinese for the achievement and said in Putonghua: "Welcome to space. Have a safe journey". Malenchenko added: "I love to have somebody else in space instead of (just) me and Ed".

During the STS-106 mission, while on a space phone call with professor Lloyd Kaufman, Ed Lu observed that there is no moon illusion in space

While still employed at NASA, Lu co-founded the B612 Foundation along with former astronaut Rusty Schweickart and scientists Clark Chapman and Piet Hut. It has conducted two lines of related research to help detect asteroids that could one day strike the Earth, and find the technological means for asteroid deflection. The foundation's current goal is to design and build a privately financed asteroid-finding space telescope, Sentinel, to be launched in 2017–2018. The Sentinel's infrared telescope, once parked in an orbit similar to that of Venus, will help identify asteroids and other near-Earth objects (NEOs) that pose a risk of collision with Earth.

== Magic trick in space ==
While on the ISS, Lu teamed up with magician James Randi (founder of JREF) to perform a card trick in outer space. Randi asked Lu to (without looking) select a card from the middle of a brand new freshly shuffled deck of cards, turn it around and reinsert the card into the deck the opposite direction. Then place the deck of cards back into its box then take them out again and fan the cards to the camera. This same procedure was being done by Randi back on Earth at the JREF headquarters in front of witnesses from the Miami Herald. Both Randi and Lu successfully selected the same card, the seven of diamonds. The remaining cards were jettisoned for weight reasons before returning to Earth, but Lu smuggled the card home. The two cards complete with autographs are framed for public view at the JREF offices in Fort Lauderdale, FL. Randi asks Lu "What are the odds that we would both choose the same card?" Lu answers "Knowing you and your tricky ways, the odds were one in one, because it's a trick!"

== Post-NASA career ==
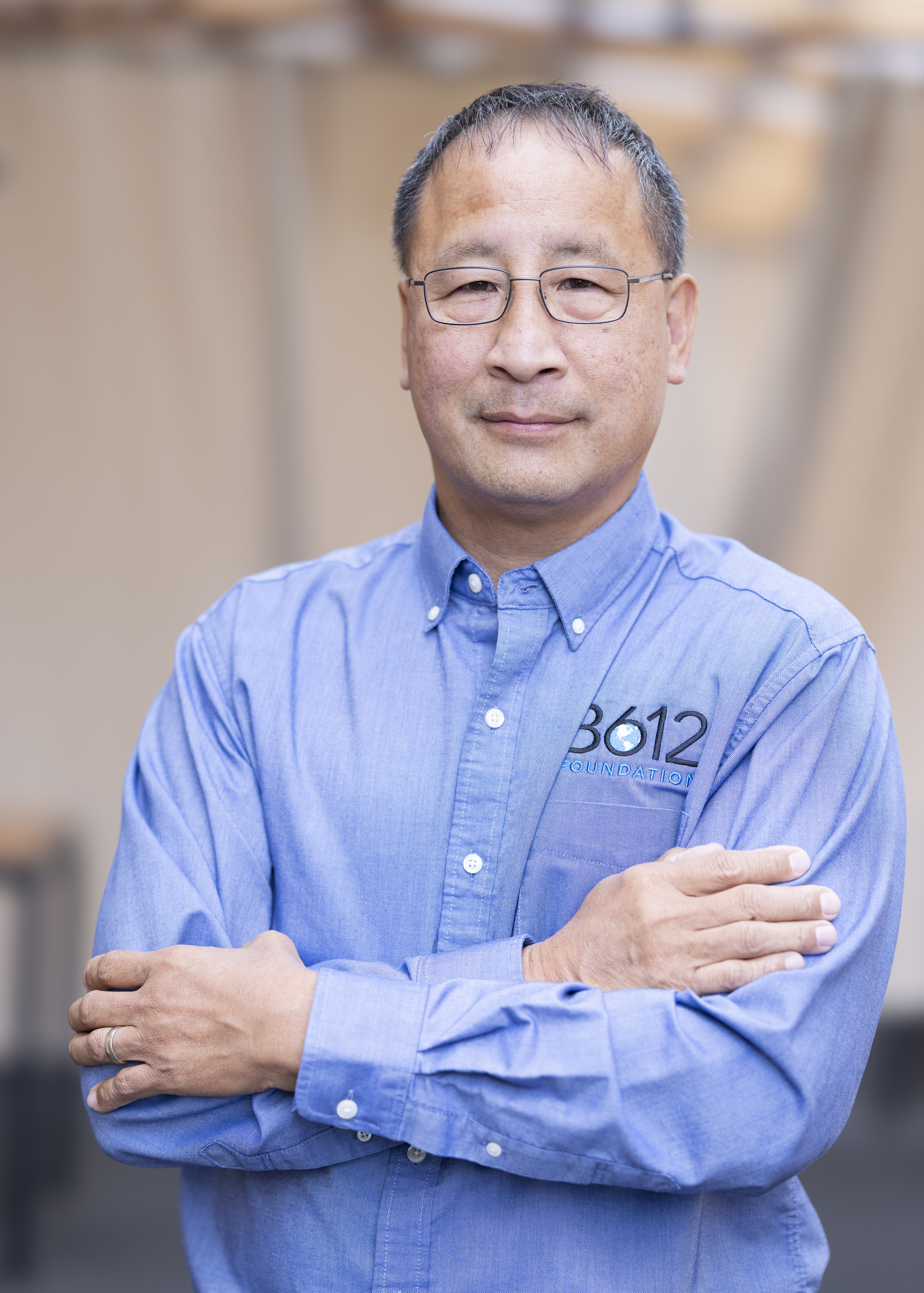
Lu in 2022

On August 10, 2007, Lu announced he was retiring from NASA to work at Google.

In June 2010, Lu left Google and worked out of the Sunfire Offices. In September 2011, Lu joined Liquid Robotics as Chief of Innovative Applications, where his work includes outreach to promote new applications for ocean science, and in 2012, he joined Hover Inc. as its Chief Technology Officer.

On June 28, 2012, Lu, with Apollo 9 Astronaut Rusty Schweickart and G. Scott Hubbard, Astronautics professor at Stanford University announced plans to build and operate the first privately-funded deep space mission called Sentinel. Their non-profit B612 Foundation will launch an infrared space telescope in orbit around the Sun, where from a distance as great as 270,000,000 kilometers (170,000,000 mi) from Earth, where it would detect and track asteroids and other near-Earth objects posing threats to the planet. On October 25, 2016, B612 and Lu endorsed NASA's NEOcam proposed mission and ended the Sentinel project.

As of 2022, Lu is working on a new project to find "killer asteroids" by analyzing terabytes of archived data. So far, the B612 Foundation, cofounded by Lu, has found over 100 new potentially-threatening asteroids. This immense number-crunching effort is supported in part by Google's applied artificial intelligence project.

== Personal life ==
Lu is married and has two children.

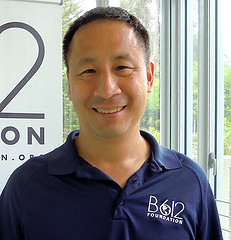
co-founder of the B612 Foundation (18 July 2014)

Assessing the Risks, Impacts and Solutions for Space Threats, Senate Subcommittee on Science and Space testimony on March 23, 2013

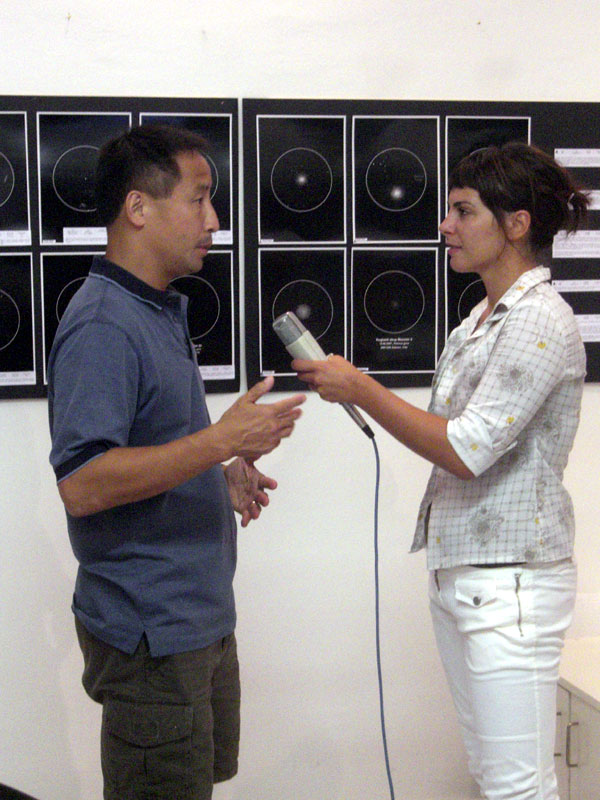
Ed Lu giving interview for Croatian Television during Dalmatian Space Summer (21 August 2007)

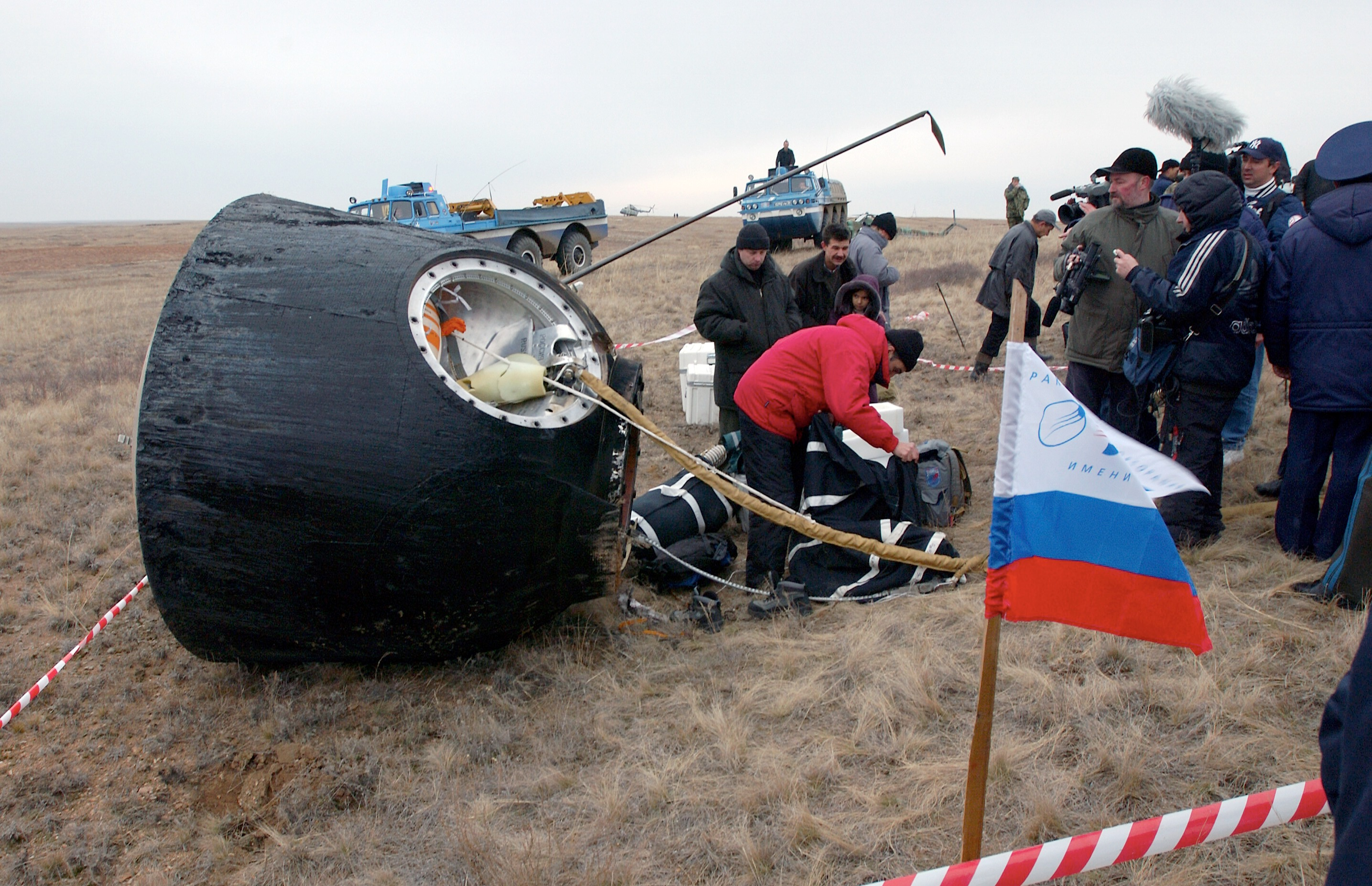
Landing in Kazakhstan (October 27, 2003)

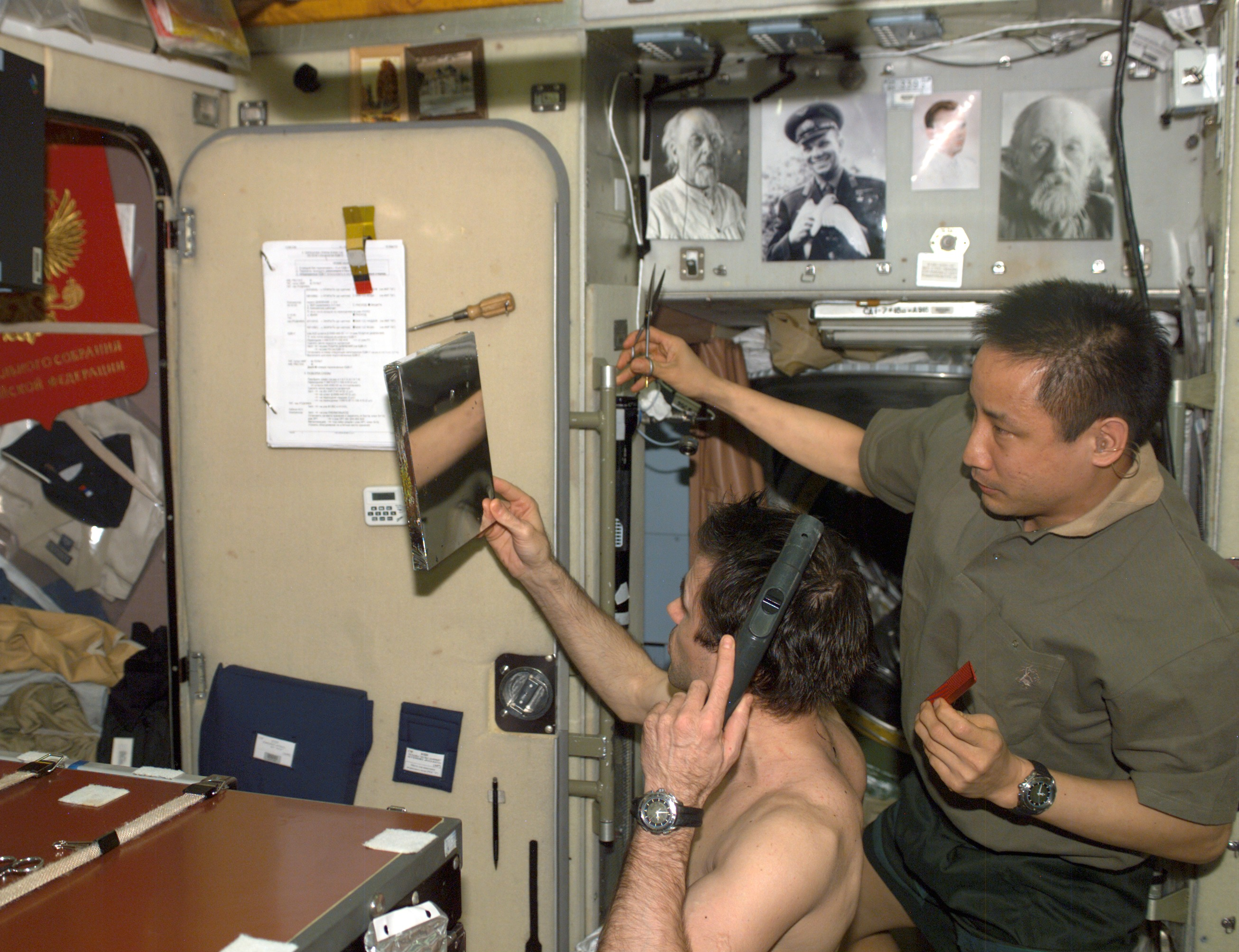
Haircut in space (12 August 2003)

== See also ==
- List of Asian American astronauts
- Leroy Chiao
- Taylor Wang
