= STS-106 =

2000 American crewed spaceflight to the ISS

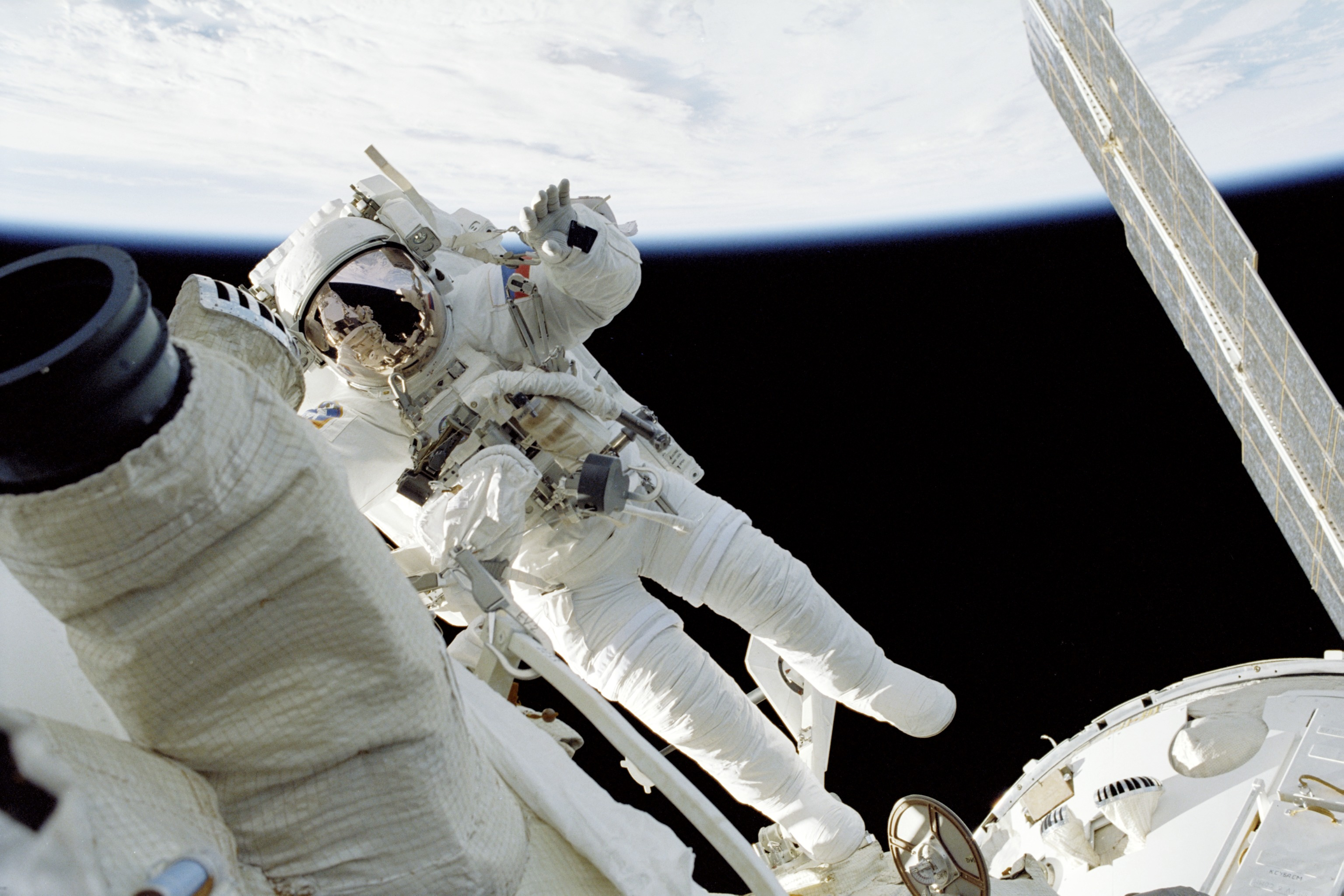
- Malenchenko outside Zarya during an EVA
- Names: Space Transportation System-106
- Mission type: ISS assembly
- Operator: NASA
- COSPAR ID: 2000-053A
- SATCAT no.: 26489
- Mission duration: 11 days, 19 hours, 12 minutes, 15 seconds
- Distance travelled: 7,900,000 km (4,900,000 mi)
- Orbits completed: 185

Spacecraft properties
- Spacecraft: Space Shuttle Atlantis
- Launch mass: 115,259 kg (254,103 lb)
- Landing mass: 100,369 kg (221,276 lb)
- Payload mass: 10,219 kg (22,529 lb)

Crew
- Crew size: 7
- Members: Terrence W. Wilcutt; Scott D. Altman; Edward T. Lu; Richard A. Mastracchio; Daniel C. Burbank; Yuri Malenchenko; Boris Morukov
- EVAs: 1
- EVA duration: 6 hours, 14 minutes

Start of mission
- Launch date: 8 September 2000, 12:45:47 UTC
- Launch site: Kennedy, LC-39B

End of mission
- Landing date: 20 September 2000, 07:56 UTC
- Landing site: Kennedy, SLF Runway 15

Orbital parameters
- Reference system: Geocentric
- Regime: Low Earth
- Perigee altitude: 375 km (233 mi)
- Apogee altitude: 386 km (240 mi)
- Inclination: 51.6 degrees
- Period: 92.2 minutes

Docking with ISS
- Docking port: Unity, PMA-2
- Docking date: 10 September 2000, 05:51:25 UTC
- Undocking date: 18 September 2000, 03:46:00 UTC
- Time docked: 7 days, 21 hours, 54 minutes, 35 seconds
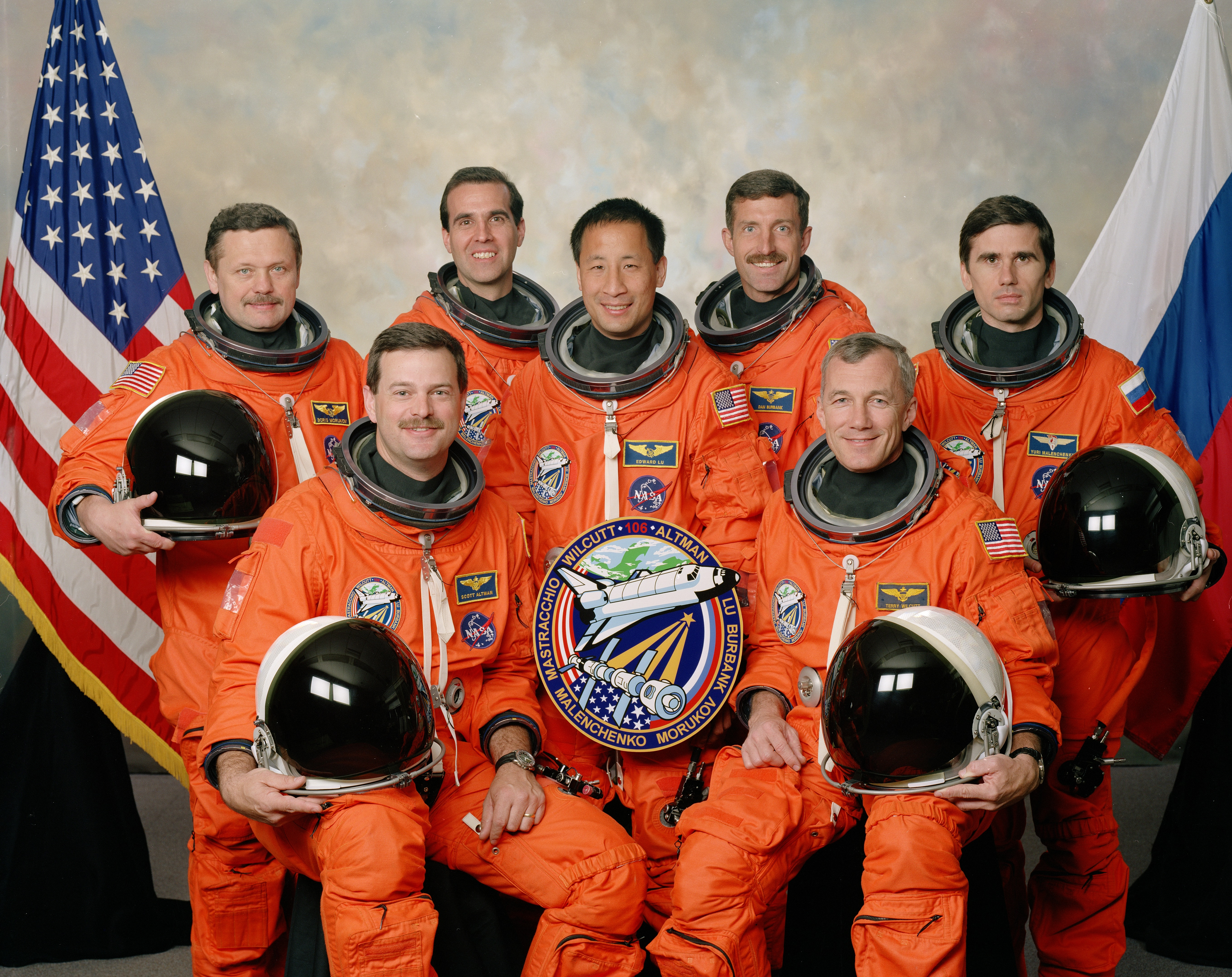
- Left to right: Front row – Altman and Wilcutt; Back row – Morukov, Mastracchio, Lu, Burbank, Malenchenko. Space Shuttle program

STS-106 was a 2000 Space Shuttle mission to the International Space Station (ISS) flown by Space Shuttle Atlantis.

== Crew ==
Position	Astronaut
Commander	(United States) Terrence W. Wilcutt; Fourth and last spaceflight
Pilot	(United States) Scott D. Altman; Second spaceflight
Mission Specialist 1	(United States) Edward T. Lu; Second spaceflight
Mission Specialist 2 Flight Engineer	(United States) Richard A. Mastracchio; First spaceflight
Mission Specialist 3	(United States) Daniel C. Burbank; First spaceflight
Mission Specialist 4	(Russia) Yuri Malenchenko, RKA; Second spaceflight
Mission Specialist 5	(Russia) Boris Morukov, RKA; Only spaceflight

=== Spacewalks ===
- Lu and Malenchenko – EVA 1
- EVA 1 Start: 11 September 2000 – 04:47 UTC
- EVA 1 End: 11 September 2000 – 11:01 UTC
- Duration: 6 hours, 14 minutes

=== Crew seat assignments ===
Seat	Launch	Landing	Seats 1–4 are on the flight deck. Seats 5–7 are on the mid-deck.
1	Wilcutt		Seats 1–4 are on the flight deck. Seats 5–7 are on the mid-deck.
2	Altman		Seats 1–4 are on the flight deck. Seats 5–7 are on the mid-deck.
3	Lu	Burbank	Seats 1–4 are on the flight deck. Seats 5–7 are on the mid-deck.
4	Mastracchio		Seats 1–4 are on the flight deck. Seats 5–7 are on the mid-deck.
5	Burbank	Lu	Seats 1–4 are on the flight deck. Seats 5–7 are on the mid-deck.
6	Malenchenko		Seats 1–4 are on the flight deck. Seats 5–7 are on the mid-deck.
7	Morukov		Seats 1–4 are on the flight deck. Seats 5–7 are on the mid-deck.

== Mission highlights ==
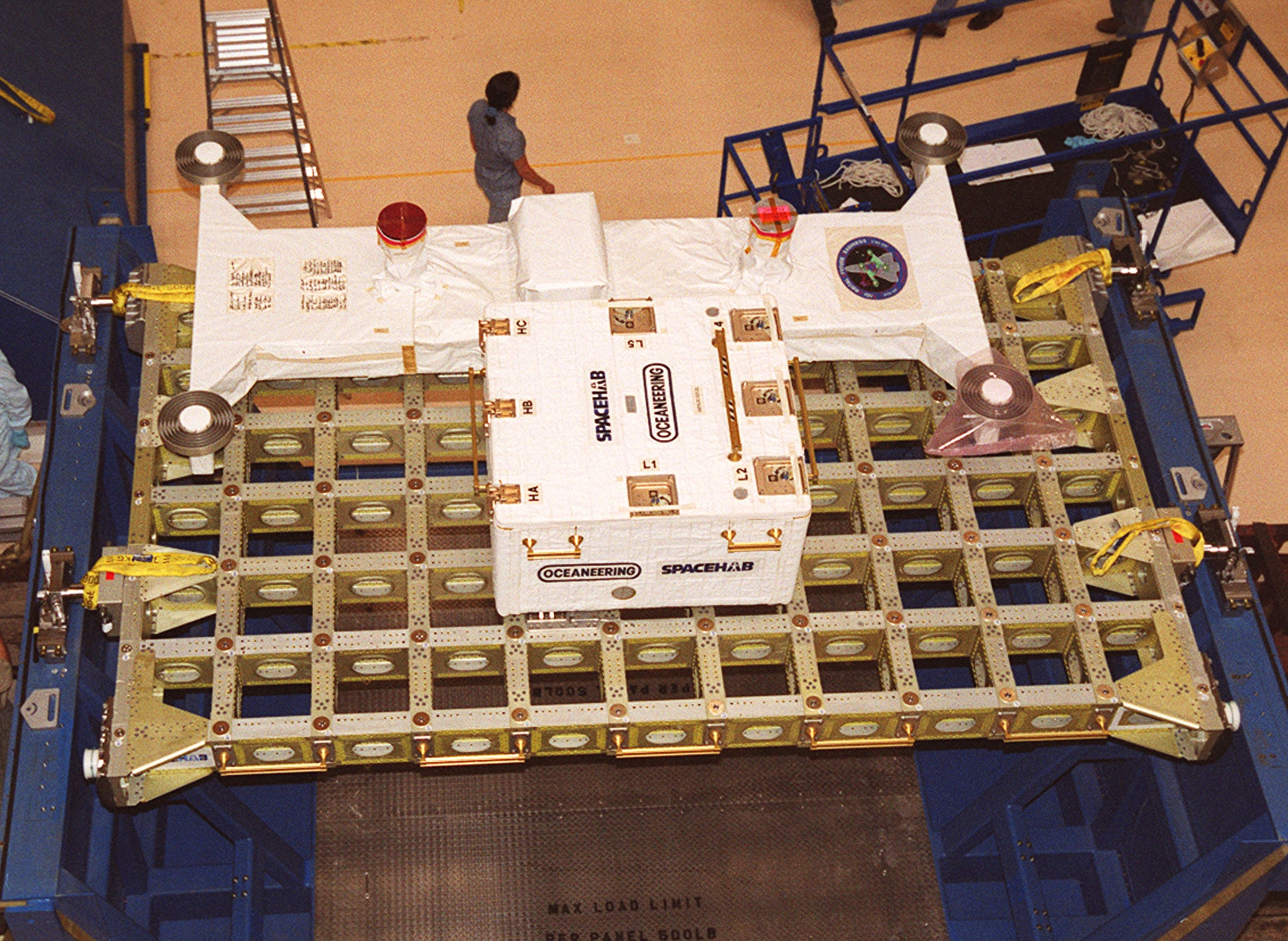
ICC STS-106

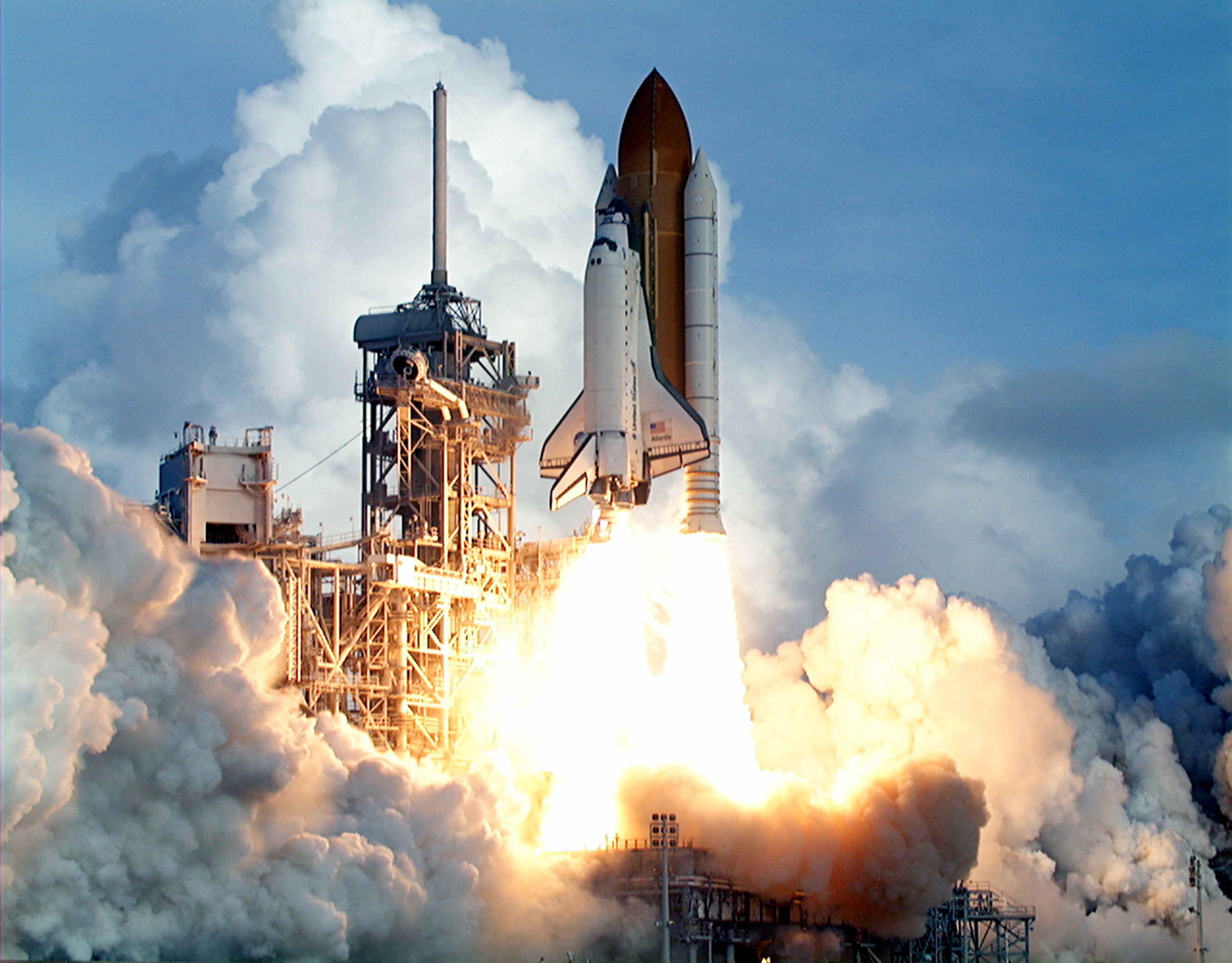
Launch of the Space Shuttle Atlantis and the beginning of the STS-106 mission.

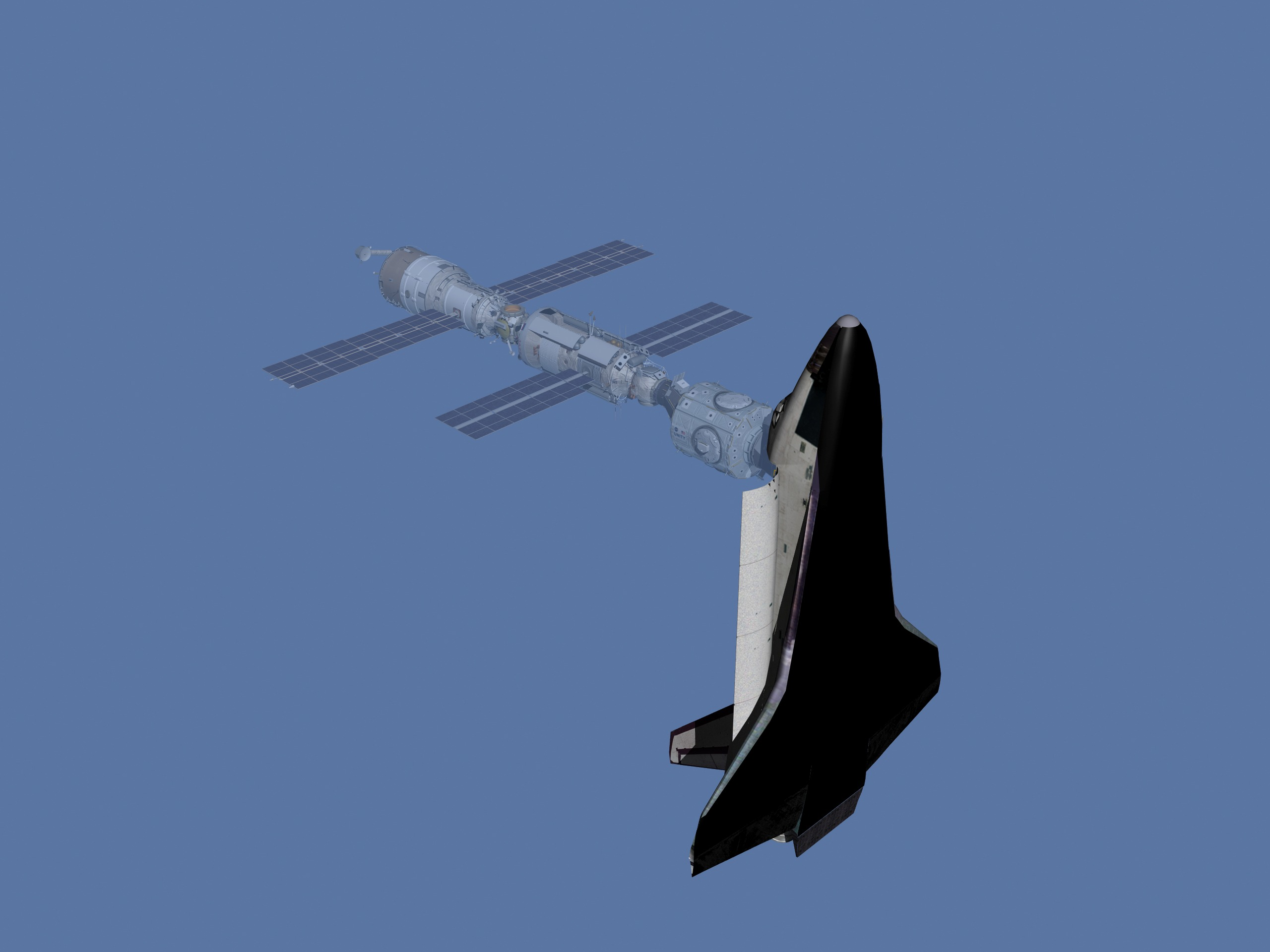
Illustration of the International Space Station during STS-106.

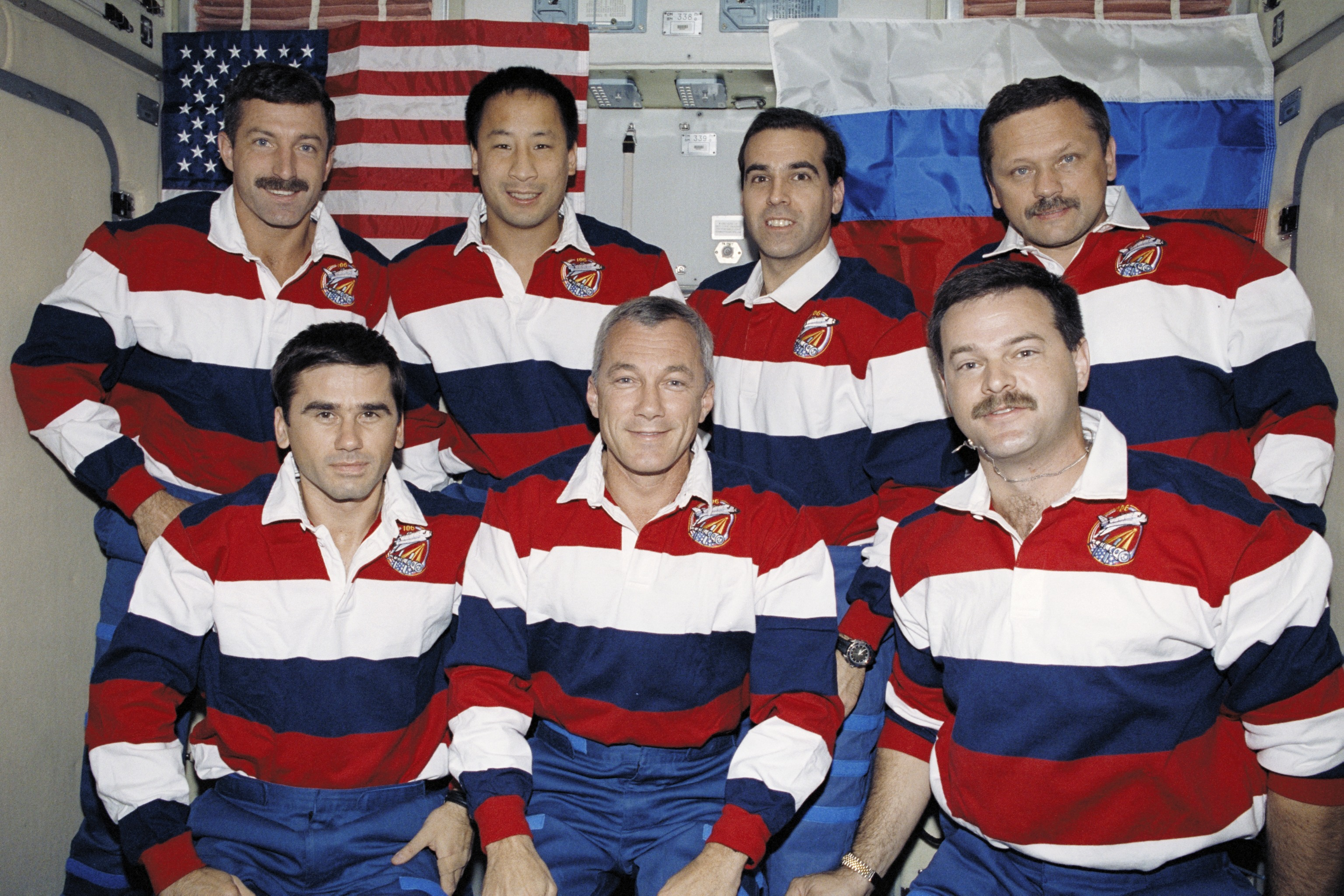
Crewmembers pose for the inflight crew portrait.

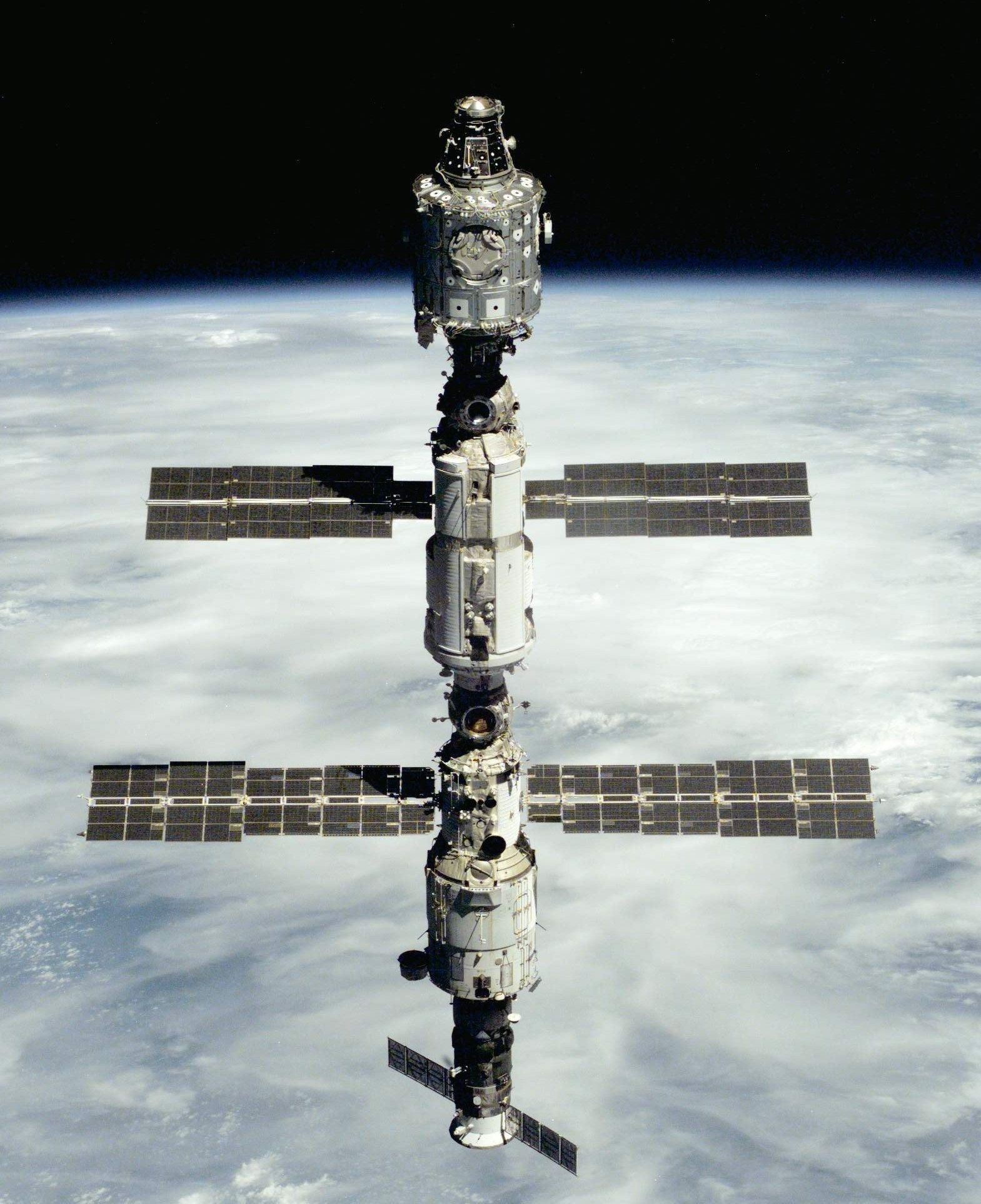
The International Space Station as seen from STS-106. In view are the station's Unity, Zarya, and Zvezda modules, in addition to a docked Progress spacecraft.

Space Station assembly flight ISS-2A.2b utilized the SPACEHAB Double Module and the Integrated Cargo Carrier (ICC) to bring supplies to the station. The mission also included one spacewalk.

Veteran Astronaut Terrence Wilcutt (Col., USMC) led the seven-man crew, commanding his second Shuttle flight and making his fourth trip into space. During the planned 11-day mission, Wilcutt and his crew mates spent a week inside the ISS unloading supplies from both a double SPACEHAB cargo module in the rear of Atlantis's cargo bay and from a Russian Progress M-1 resupply craft docked to the aft end of the Zvezda Service Module. Zvezda, which linked up to the ISS on 26 July, served as the early living quarters for the station and is the cornerstone of the Russian contribution to the ISS.

Mission STS-106 was added to the manifest after delays in launching Zvezda. The STS-101 flight was originally planned to carry cargo to the ISS and have three crew perform an EVA to connect Zvezda to the ISS, but the delays caused the mission objectives of STS-101 to be split into 2A.2a (STS-101) and 2A.2b (STS-106). The three spacewalk crewmembers Lu, Williams, and Malenchenko followed their EVA onto STS-106.

The goal of the flight was to prepare Zvezda for the arrival of the first residents, or Expedition, crew later in the fall of 2000 and the start of a permanent human presence on the new outpost. That crew, made up of Expedition Commander Bill Shepherd, Soyuz Commander Yuri Gidzenko and Flight Engineer Sergei Krikalev, launched on 31 October 2000 in a Soyuz capsule from the Baikonur Cosmodrome in Kazakhstan for a four-month "shakedown" mission aboard the ISS.

On flight day three, Dr. Ed Lu and Yuri Malenchenko (Col., Russian Air Force), who were both making their second flights into space, conducted a 6-hour and 14 minute space walk. The spacewalk's objective focused on routing and connecting nine power, data and communications cables between the Zvezda module and the other Russian-built module, Zarya, as well as installing the six-foot-long magnetometer. The magnetometer would serve as a three-dimensional compass designed to minimize Zvezda propellant usage by relaying information to the module's computers regarding its orientation relative to the Earth.

Lu and Malenchenko used tethers and handrails along the ISS to make their way to a point more than 100 feet (30 m) above the cargo bay, the farthest any tethered spacewalker has ventured outside the shuttle. They completed this with the assistance of their crewmates Burbank and Mastracchio who deftly maneuvered them around with the robotic arm. This spacewalk celebrates the sixth spacewalk in support of the station assembly and the 50th spacewalk in Space Shuttle history. Also this was the second joint U.S.-Russian space walk outside a Space Shuttle, following on the work conducted by Astronaut Scott Parazynski and Cosmonaut Vladimir Titov outside Atlantis while docked to the Mir Space Station during the STS-86 mission in October 1997. Lu, designated EV 1, wore the space suit marked by red stripes, while Malenchenko, EV 2, wore the pure white suit. This was Lu's first space walk, while Malenchenko had conducted a pair of space walks totaling 12 hours during his four-month stay aboard Mir in 1994. Dan Burbank (Lt. Cmdr, USCG), who was a spaceflight rookie, served as the space walk choreographer.

Mission Specialist Rick Mastracchio, also a spaceflight novice, was the prime robot arm operator for the mission, using the Canadian-built arm to move Lu and Malenchenko around the ISS as they conducted their assembly work. Mastracchio is backed up on arm operations by Pilot Scott Altman (Cmdr., USN), making his second flight into space.

The final member of the crew was Russian Cosmonaut Dr. Boris Morukov, making his first flight into space. Morukov was responsible for unloading supplies from the Progress vehicle during the docked phase of the flight.

On flight day four the crew entered the International Space Station through Pressurized Mating Adapter-2 (PMA-2) to begin the transfer operations of more than three tons of hardware and supplies. Atlantis' crew was the first to see the interior of the Russian Zvezda service module since it was launched from the Baikonur Cosmodrome in July. Additionally, a reboost was performed using the orbiter's Reaction Control System (RCS) to place the station in a higher orbit.

Transfer of supplies and maintenance tasks continued well into the fifth day, while orbiter consumables remained above the required levels allowing managers to extend the mission one additional day.

Activities on flight day five included the installation of three batteries inside Zvezda. In order to reduce the weight for launch, Zvezda was launched with only five of its eight batteries in place.

Lu and Malenchenko spent much of flight day seven installing voltage and current stabilizers in Zvezda. Components of the Elektron system, equipment sent into orbit to separate water into oxygen and hydrogen, were installed and would be activated after the first crew arrives.

The crew transferred more than 6,000 pounds of material – including six 100-pound bags of water, all of the food for the first resident crew, office supplies, onboard environmental supplies, a vacuum cleaner and a computer and monitor – to the interior of the station.

The astronauts spent a total of 5 days, 9 hours and 21 minutes inside the station before closing the hatch on the orbiting outpost. Wilcutt and Altman commanded a series of four altitude boosts to place the station in an orbit of approximately 241 by 233 statute miles, raising the average altitude by 14 miles (23 km). After spending 7 days, 21 hours and 54 minutes linked to the station, Atlantis undocked at 11:46 pm EDT as Wilcutt and Altman fired Atlantis' jets to move to a distance of about 450 feet for a double-loop flyaround.

Commander Terry Wilcutt guided Atlantis to a landing at 2:56 am Central time, wrapping up a 4.9 million mile mission in which more than three tons of equipment were delivered to the international outpost. Wilcutt and his crewmates, Pilot Scott Altman and Mission Specialists Ed Lu, Rick Mastracchio, Dan Burbank, Yuri Malenchenko and Boris Morukov completed the 23rd consecutive landing of a shuttle at the Florida spaceport, and the 30th landing of a Shuttle at the Cape in the last 31 flights.

The first initial amateur radio station was flown on board the Space Shuttle Atlantis on STS-106. The crew transferred the ham radio gear into the space station for future use by the Expedition One crew.

== See also ==
- List of human spaceflights
- List of International Space Station spacewalks
- List of Space Shuttle missions
- List of spacewalks 2000–2014
- Outline of space science
- Space Shuttle
