= Akihiko Hoshide =

Japanese astronaut and engineer (born 1968)

- 星出 彰彦
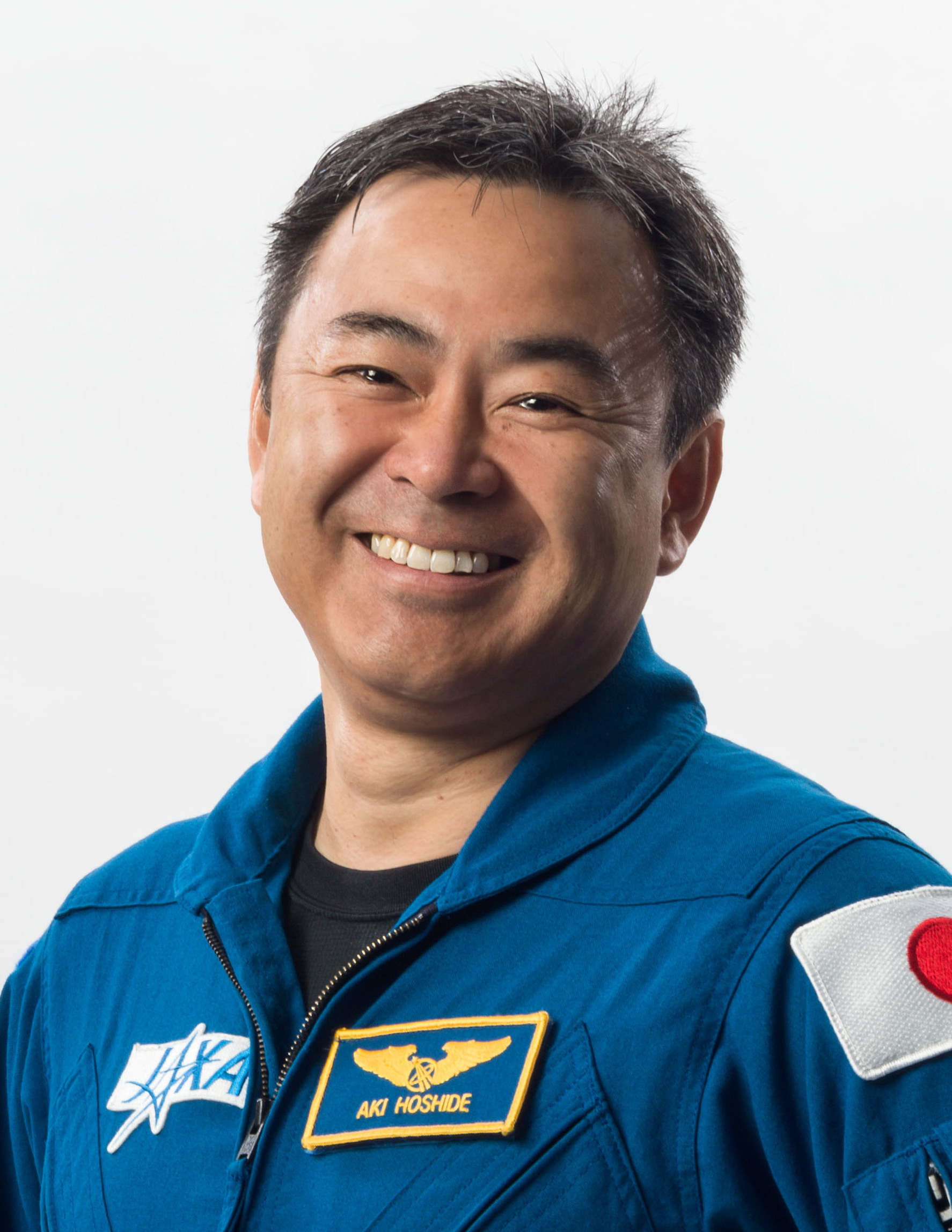
- Hoshide in 2020
- Born: December 28, 1968 (age 57); Setagaya, Tokyo, Japan
- Education: Keio University; University of Houston
- Occupation: Engineer
- Space career

JAXA astronaut
- Status: Active
- Time in space: 340 days, 11 hours, 41 minutes
- Selection: 1999 NASDA Group
- Total EVAs: 4
- Total EVA time: 28 hours, 17 minutes
- Missions: STS-124; Soyuz TMA-05M (Expedition 32/33); SpaceX Crew-2 (Expedition 65/66)
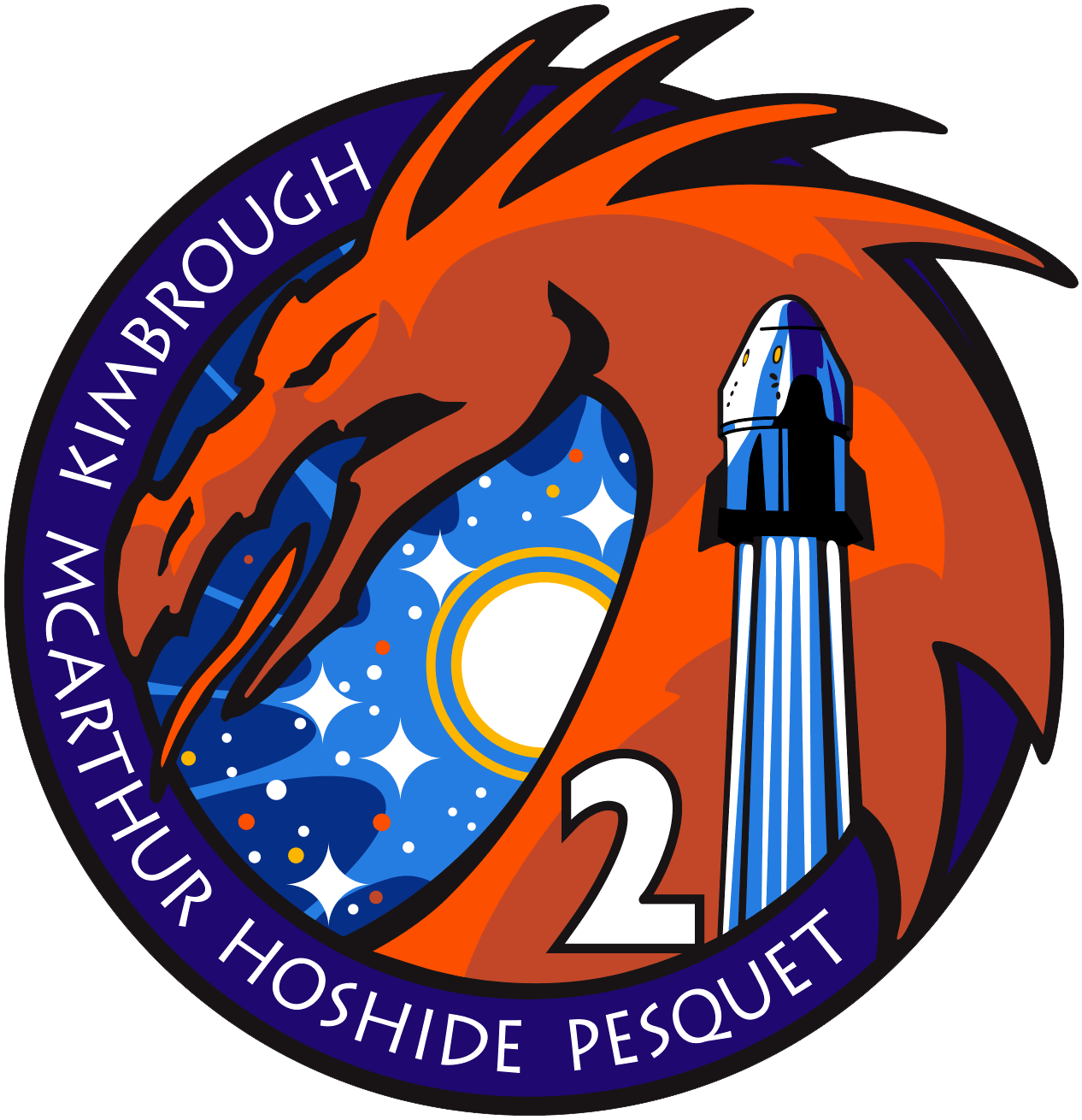
- Mission insignia

Akihiko Hoshide (Japanese: 星出 彰彦, Hepburn: Hoshide Akihiko; born December 28, 1968) is a Japanese engineer, JAXA astronaut, and former commander of the International Space Station. On August 30, 2012, Hoshide became the third Japanese astronaut to walk in space.

== Early life and education ==
He was born on December 28, 1968 in Tokyo, Japan.

He received an International Baccalaureate Diploma from the United World College of South East Asia, Singapore in 1987, a bachelor's degree in mechanical engineering from Keio University in 1992, and a Master of Science degree in aerospace engineering from the University of Houston Cullen College of Engineering in 1997.

== Experience ==
Hoshide joined the National Space Development Agency of Japan (NASDA) in 1992 and worked in the development of the H-II launch vehicle for two years. From 1994 to 1999, he was as an astronaut support engineer for the NASDA Astronaut Office, supporting the development of the astronaut training program, and he supported astronaut Koichi Wakata during Wakata's training and mission on STS-72.

== Astronaut career ==
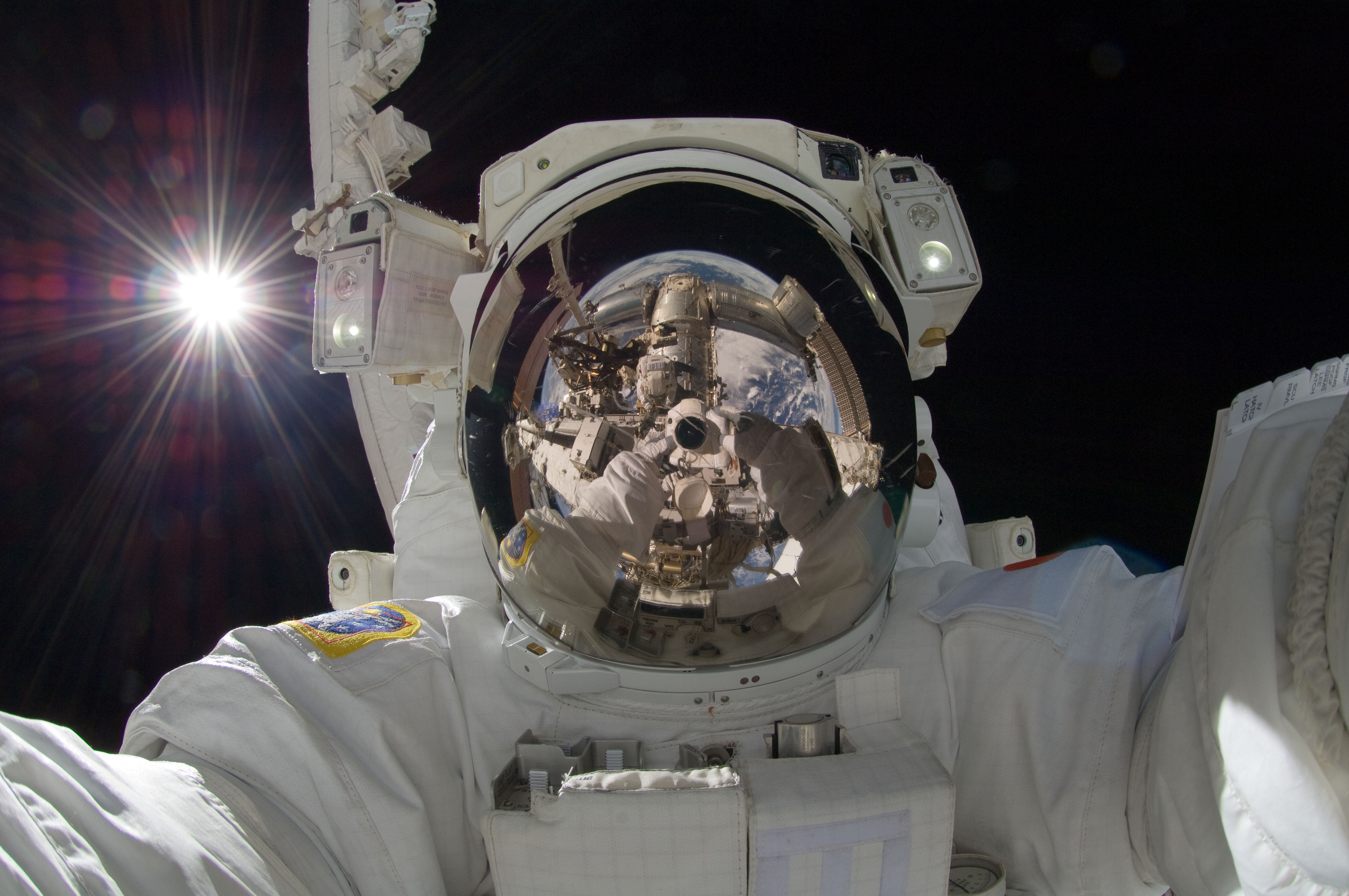
Hoshide taking a space selfie during extravehicular activity (EVA) on September 5, 2012, with the Sun behind him

In February 1999 Hoshide was selected by NASDA (now JAXA) as one of three Japanese astronaut candidates for the International Space Station (ISS). He started the ISS Astronaut Basic Training program in April 1999 and was certified as an astronaut in January 2001. Since April 2001, he has participated in ISS Advanced Training, as well as supporting the development of the hardware and operation of the Japanese Experiment Module Kibō and the H-II Transfer Vehicle (HTV).

From 21 July 2014 to 29 July 2014 Hoshide commanded NASA Extreme Environment Mission Operations Mission 18 (NEEMO 18) to the Aquarius Reef Base of the coast of Key Largo, Florida. He was joined by NASA astronaut Jeanette Epps and Mark Vande Hei as well as ESA astronaut Thomas Pesquet during the nine-day mission.

In 2016 he served as part of the 2016 European Space Agency's Cooperative Adventure for Valuing and Exercising human behaviour and performance Skills (CAVES) expedition. Where he spent two weeks underground in caves alongside NASA astronauts Ricky Arnold and Jessica Meir, CNSA taikonaut Ye Guangfu, Roscosmos cosmonaut Sergei Korsakov and ESA astronaut Pedro Duque in order to simulate spaceflight conditions.

=== STS-124 ===
Hoshide's first mission was as mission specialist on board Space Shuttle Discovery for the STS-124 mission, which was the second of three missions to deliver the Japanese Experiment Module, nicknamed Kibō, to the ISS. STS-124 launched on 31 May 2008 from the Kennedy Space Center on its mission to the space station.

Discovery and its crew docked to the International Space Station on 2 June 2008, beginning 8 days of operations to install the Japanese Experiment Module-Pressurised Module (JEM-PM). On Flight Day 4, NASA astronauts Mike Fossum and Ronald Garan performed a spacewalk to prepare the ISS and the JEM-PM for installation, during this Hoshide and fellow STS-124 Mission Specialist Greg Chamitoff robotically removed the module from Discovery's payload bay and moved it to its new home on the port the side of Node 2. The next day the STS-124 and Expedition 17 crews opened Kibō for the first time.

Hoshide and the STS-124 crew remained on the ISS until 11 June 2008, when Discovery undocked from the International Space Station and began its return to Earth, leaving Greg Chamintoff on board as a flight engineer on the Expedition 17 crew, and returning Expedition 17 Flight Engineer Garrett Reisman. On 14 June 2008, Discovery landed on the Shuttle Landing Facility at the Kennedy Space Center following 13 days, 18 hours, 13 minutes in space, officially ending the STS-124 mission.

=== Expedition 32/33 ===
In November 2009 Hoshide was assigned to the crew of ISS Expedition 32/Expedition 33 as a flight engineer. He started training at the Gagarin Cosmonaut Training Center in Star City, Russia, and served on the backup crew for Expedition 30/31, which launched aboard Soyuz TMA-03M on 21 December 2011.

Following the launch of Expedition 30/31, Hoshide started training for his own flight, alongside Roscosmos cosmonaut Yuri Malenchenko and NASA astronaut Sunita Williams. The trio launched onboard Soyuz TMA-05M on 15 July 2012 ahead of a two-day flight to the ISS. The three crewmembers arrived on board the ISS on 17 July 2012 and officially became members of the Expedition 32 crew, joining Russian Commander Gennady Padalka, Russian Flight Engineer Sergei Revin and NASA Flight Engineer Joe Acaba.

On 27 August 2012 Hoshide robotically captured and berthed JAXA's HTV-3 uncrewed cargo spacecraft, on 30 August he ventured outside the ISS alongside Williams for his first spacewalk, over the eight hour, 17-minute spacewalk, the two astronauts prepared a Main Bus Switching Unit (MBSU) for replacement on a later spacewalk and switched some cables on the Russian Orbital Segment ahead of the launch and docking of the future Nauka laboratory module. On 5 September he and Williams went outside the station again, for a 6-hour, 28-minute spacewalk to replace the MBSU the two had prepared for replacement on the last spacewalk. They also replaced a camera on Canadarm-2.

On 16 September 2012, Paldalka, Revin and Acaba departed the station onboard Soyuz TMA-04M, following which Hoshide, Williams and Malenchenko became part of the Expedition 33 crew, with Williams taking command of the station for the increment. They were later joined by Soyuz TMA-06M crewmembers Oleg Novitsky and Evgeny Tarelkin, both of Roscosmos, and NASA astronaut Kevin Ford. On 11 October 2012 Hoshide and Williams successfully robotically captured SpaceX's Cargo Dragon CRS-1 uncrewed resupply spacecraft, the first mission contracted under NASA's Commercial Resupply Services contract. On 1 November Hoshide stepped outside the station with Williams for a third time and performed a six-hour, 38-minute spacewalk to carry out several maintenance tasks on the US Orbital Segment of the station, during which Hoshide took hold of the record for most cumulative spacewalk time for a Japanese astronaut, at 21-hours and 23-minutes total.

Expedition 33 officially ended on 18 November 2012 with the undocking of Soyuz TMA-05M. Malenchenko, Williams and Hoshide safely landed approximately six hours after undocking near the remote town of Arkalyk, Kazakhstan following 127 days in space.

=== Expedition 65/66 ===
Hoshide launched into space for the third time in 2021 aboard SpaceX Crew-2. He served as a flight engineer on Expedition 65. On 27 April 2021, Hoshide assumed command of the ISS from NASA astronaut Shannon Walker, becoming only the second Japanese astronaut to command the station, following Koichi Wakata, who commanded Expedition 39 in 2014.

Preceded by Shannon Walker	ISS Commander (Expedition 65); 27 April to 4 October 2021	Succeeded by Thomas Pesquet
