= Expedition 32 =

Long-duration mission to the International Space Station

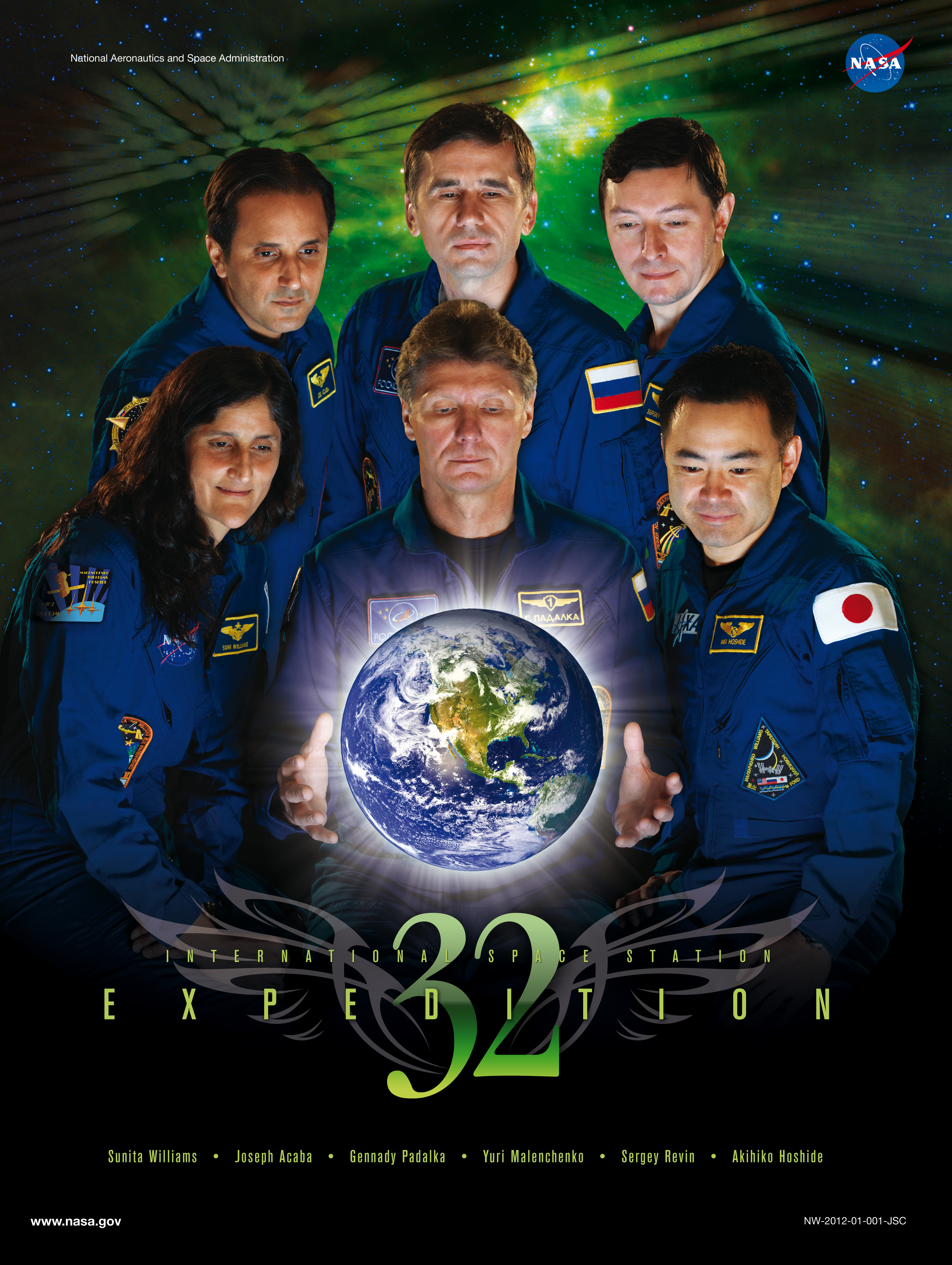
- Promotional Poster
- Mission type: Long-duration expedition

Expedition
- Space station: International Space Station
- Began: 1 July 2012, 04:48 UTC
- Ended: 16 September 2012, 23:09 UTC
- Arrived aboard: Soyuz TMA-04M; Soyuz TMA-05M
- Departed aboard: Soyuz TMA-04M; Soyuz TMA-05M

Crew
- Crew size: 6
- Members: Expedition 31/32: Gennady Padalka; Joseph M. Acaba; Sergey Revin Expedition 32/33: Sunita Williams; Yuri Malenchenko; Akihiko Hoshide
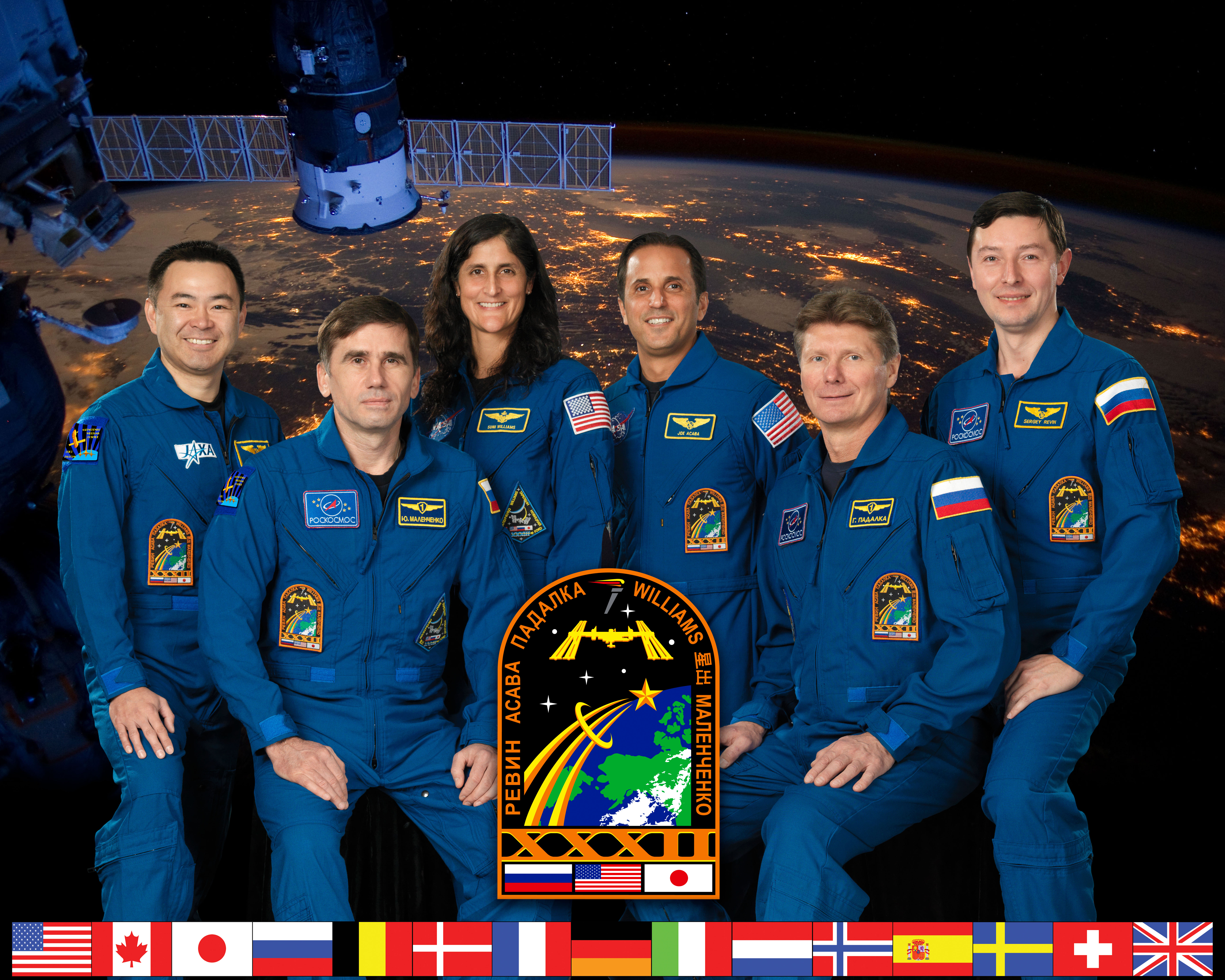
- Expedition 32 mission patch (l-r) Hoshide, Malenchenko, Williams, Acaba, Padalka and Revin ISS expeditions

Expedition 32 was the 32nd long-duration expedition to the International Space Station (ISS). It began on 1 July 2012 with the departure from the ISS of the Soyuz TMA-03M spacecraft, which returned the Expedition 31 crew to Earth, and concluded on 16 September 2012 with the departure of Soyuz TMA-04M. The Soyuz craft returned to Earth on 17 September 2012 at 6:53am Moscow Standard Time when touchdown was officially recorded by the Russian Federal Space Agency.

== Crew ==
| Position | First part (July 2012) | Second part (July 2012 to September 2012) |
|---|---|---|
| Commander | Gennady Padalka, RSA; Fourth spaceflight | |
| Flight Engineer 1 | Joseph M. Acaba, NASA; Second spaceflight | |
| Flight Engineer 2 | Sergey Revin, RSA; Only spaceflight | |
| Flight Engineer 3 | | Sunita Williams, NASA; Second spaceflight |
| Flight Engineer 4 | | Yuri Malenchenko, RSA; Fifth spaceflight |
| Flight Engineer 5 | | Akihiko Hoshide, JAXA; Second spaceflight |

Source
NASA
