= Joseph M. Acaba =

American hydrogeologist and astronaut (born 1967)

Joe Acabá
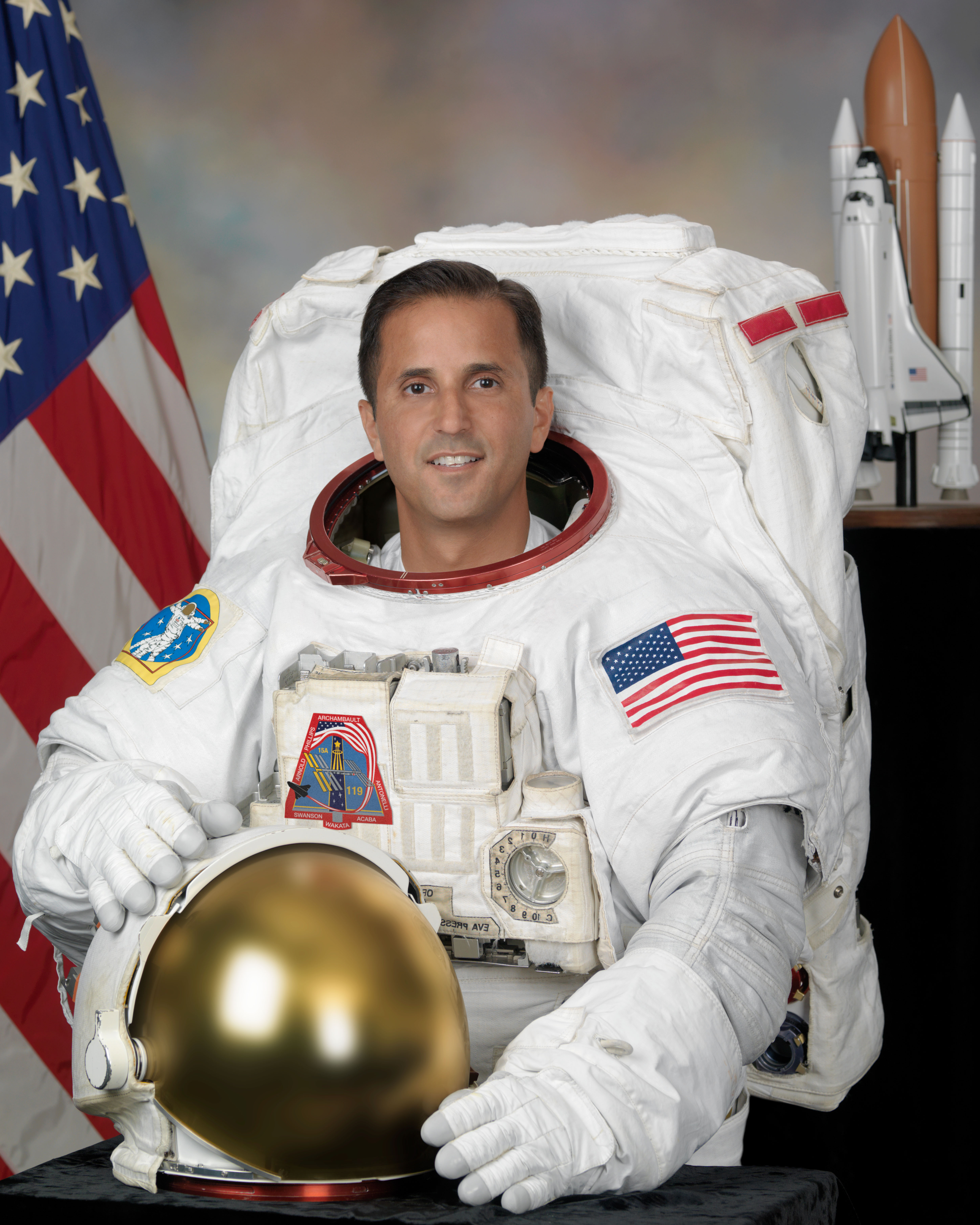
- Acabá in 2008
- Born: Joseph Michael Acabá; May 17, 1967 (age 59); Inglewood, California, U.S.
- Education: University of California, Santa Barbara (BS); University of Arizona (MS); Texas Tech University (MEd)
- Space career

NASA astronaut
- Rank: Sergeant, USMCR
- Time in space: 306 days, 34 minutes
- Selection: NASA Group 19 (2004)
- Total EVAs: 3
- Total EVA time: 19 hours, 46 minutes
- Missions: STS-119; Soyuz TMA-04M (Expedition 31/32); Soyuz MS-06 (Expedition 53/54)
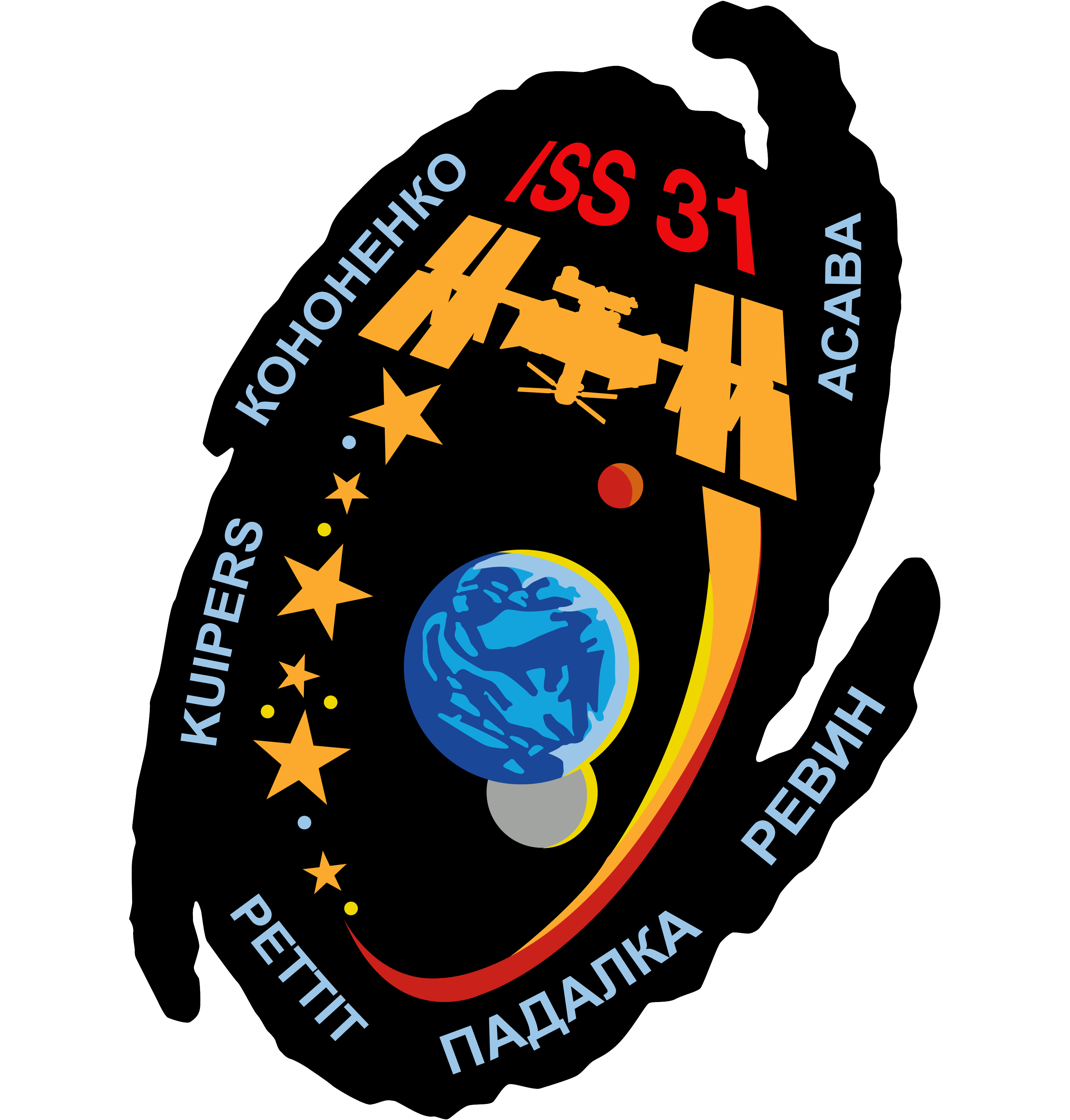
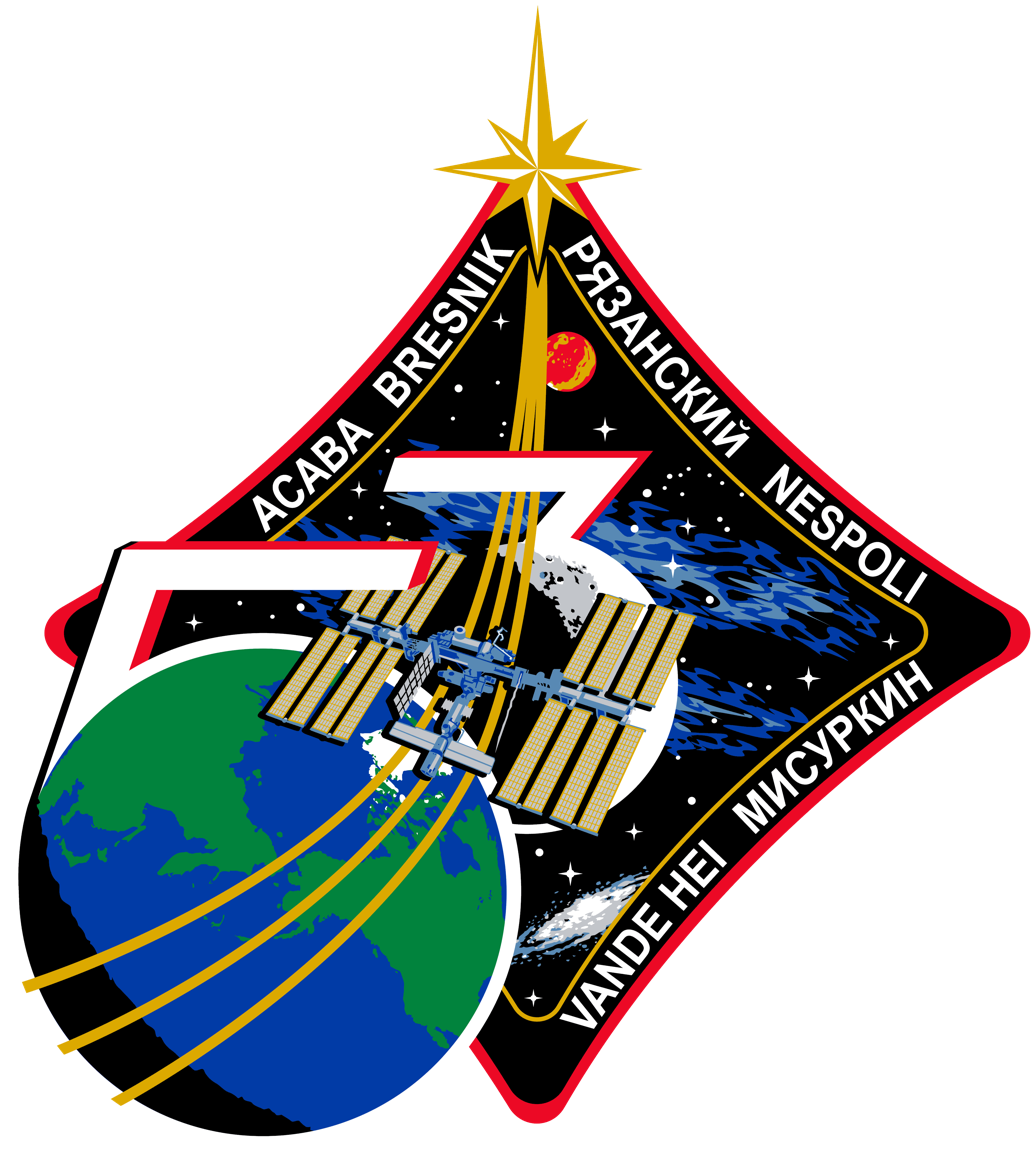
- Mission insignia

Joseph Michael Acabá (born May 17, 1967) is an American educator, hydrogeologist, and NASA astronaut. In May 2004, he became the first person of Puerto Rican ancestry to be named as a NASA astronaut candidate, when he was selected as a member of NASA Astronaut Training Group 19. He completed his training on February 10, 2006, and was assigned to STS-119, which flew from March 15 to 28, 2009, to deliver the final set of solar arrays to the International Space Station. He is the first person of Caribbean and Puerto Rican origin, and the twelfth of fifteen people of Ibero-American heritage to have flown to space as a NASA astronaut.

Acabá served as a flight engineer aboard the International Space Station, having launched on May 15, 2012. He arrived at the space station on May 17 and returned to Earth on September 17, 2012. Acaba returned to the International Space Station in 2017 as a member of Expedition 53/54. From 2023 to 2025, Acaba served as the 18th Chief of the Astronaut Office. After stepping down as a chief to the astronaut office in 2025, Acaba transitioned to the Johnson Space Center director's staff, where he provides technical advice on mission planning and strategy and supports collaboration with commercial space companies, academic institutions, and government agencies.

== Early life and education ==
Acaba's parents, Ralph and Elsie Acabá, from Hatillo, Puerto Rico, moved in the mid-1960s to Inglewood, California, where he was born. They later moved to Anaheim, California, where they still reside. Since his childhood, Acaba enjoyed reading, especially science fiction. In school, he excelled in both science and math. As a child, his parents constantly exposed him to educational films, but it was the 8-mm film showing astronaut Neil Armstrong's Moon landing that intrigued him about outer space. During his senior year in high school, Acaba became interested in scuba diving and became a certified scuba diver through a job training program at his school. He reportedly has enjoyed other outdoor activities like kayaking, camping, and hiking. His scuba experience inspired him to further his academic education in geology. In 1985, he graduated with honors from Esperanza High School in Anaheim.

In 1990, Acaba received his bachelor's degree in geology from the University of California, Santa Barbara, and in 1992, he earned his master's degree in geology from the University of Arizona. Acaba was a sergeant in the United States Marine Corps Reserve where he served for six years. He also worked as a hydrogeologist in Los Angeles, California. Acaba spent two years in the United States Peace Corps and trained over 300 teachers in the Dominican Republic in modern teaching methodologies. He then served as island manager of the Caribbean Marine Research at Lee Stocking Island in the Exumas, Bahamas.

Upon his return to the United States, Acaba moved to Florida, where he became shoreline revegetation coordinator in Vero Beach. He taught one year of science and math in high school and four years at Dunnellon Middle School. He also briefly taught at Melbourne High School in Melbourne, Florida. Upon his return to Florida in fall 2012, Acaba began coursework in the College of Education at Texas Tech University. He earned his Master of Education, curriculum and instruction from Texas Tech University in 2015.

== NASA career ==
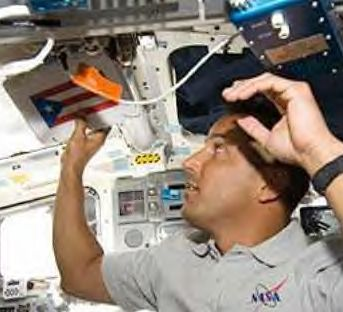
Acaba with a Puerto Rican flag aboard STS-119

On May 6, 2004, Acaba and ten other people were selected from 99 applicants by NASA as astronaut candidates. NASA's administrator, Sean O'Keefe, in the presence of John Glenn, announced the members of the "19th group of Astronaut Candidates", an event which has not been repeated since 1958 when the original group of astronauts was presented to the world. Acaba, who was selected as an Educator Mission Specialist, completed his astronaut training on February 10, 2006, along with the other ten astronaut candidates. Upon completion of his training, Acaba was assigned to the Hardware Integration Team in the International Space Station branch, working technical issues with European Space Agency (ESA) hardware.

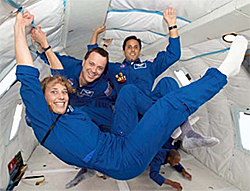
Mission Specialist Educators Dorothy Metcalf-Lindenburger, Ricky Arnold, and Joseph Acaba during a parabolic flight.

=== STS-119 ===
Acaba was assigned to the crew of STS-119 as mission specialist educator, which was launched on March 15, 2009, at 7:43 p.m., after NASA engineers repaired a leaky gas venting system the previous week, to deliver the final set of solar arrays to the International Space Station. Acaba, who carried on his person a Puerto Rican flag, requested that the crew be awakened on March 19 (Day 5) with the Puerto Rico folklore song "Qué Bonita Bandera" (What a Beautiful Flag) referring to the Puerto Rican flag, written in 1971 by Florencio Morales Ramos (Ramito) and sung by Jose Gonzalez and Banda Criolla.

On March 20, he provided support to the first mission spacewalk. On March 21, he performed a spacewalk with Steve Swanson in which he helped to successfully unfurl the final "wings" of the solar array that will augment power to the ISS. 2 days later, Acaba performed his second EVA of the mission, with crew member Ricky Arnold. The main task of the EVA was to help move the CETA carts outside of the station to a different location. On March 28 the Space Shuttle Discovery and its seven-person crew safely touched down on runway 15 at NASA's Kennedy Space Center in Florida at 3:14 p.m. EDT. Acaba said he was amazed at the views from the space station.

External videos
- Joseph Michael "Joe" Acaba and Suni Williams aboard the ISS during a Space Station Social Media Event

=== Expedition 31/32 ===
On May 15, 2012, Acaba was one of three crew members launching from Kazakhstan aboard the Soyuz TMA-04M spacecraft to the International Space Station. He and his fellow crew members, Gennady Padalka and Sergei Revin, arrived and docked with the space station two days after launch, on May 17 at 4:36 UTC. Acaba, Padalka, and Revin returned to Earth on September 17, 2012, after nearly 125 days in space.

=== Between space missions ===
Acaba served as the Branch Chief of the International Space Station Operations branch. The office is responsible for mission preparation and on-orbit support of space station crews. Until being selected as a flight engineer for Expedition 54/55, Acaba served as Director of Operations Russia in Star City, supporting crew training in Soyuz and Russian Segment systems.

In September 2019, Acaba served as cavenaut in ESA CAVES, training (between Italy and Slovenia) and spending six nights underground simulating a mission exploring another planet.

=== Expedition 53/54 ===
In 2017 it was announced that Acaba would return to the ISS for his third mission, onboard Soyuz MS-06. The Soyuz vehicle was originally slated to launch with a crew of 2, due to the Russian crew cuts on the ISS for 2017, however, at short notice, it was decided that the 3rd seat would be filled by an experienced astronaut and would be funded by Roscosmos to cancel out owed debts. Acaba's backup for the mission was Shannon Walker, who was scheduled to fly as prime crew on Soyuz MS-12 as part of Expedition 59/60, although as of December 2018, she is not assigned to that crew

Acaba launched on Soyuz MS-06 on September 12, 2017, performing a 6-hour rendezvous with the ISS. On October 20, 2017, Acaba and Randy Bresnik performed an EVA to continue with the lubrication of the new end effector on the robotic arm and to install new cameras. The duration was 6 hours and 49 minutes. During the mission Acaba's home in Houston was flooded by Hurricane Harvey and Hurricane Maria struck his native Puerto Rico.

Statistics

#	Spacecraft	Launch date (UTC)	Mission	Landing date (UTC)	Duration	EVAs	EVA duration
1	Space Shuttle Discovery	March 15, 2009, 23:43	STS-119	March 28, 2009, 19:13	12d 19h 30m	2	12h 57m
2	Soyuz TMA-04M	May 15, 2012, 03:01	ISS-31 / ISS-32	September 17, 2012, 02:52	124d 23h 51m	–	–
3	Soyuz MS-06	September 12, 2017, 21:17	ISS-53 / ISS-54	February 28, 2018	168d 5h 14m	1	6h 49m
					306d 34m	3	19h 46m

=== Chief of the Astronaut Office ===
In February 2023, Acaba became Chief of the Astronaut Office at NASA, replacing acting chief Drew Feustel, who had been in the role since Reid Wiseman stepped down in November 2022 to return to the pool of active astronauts eligible for flight assignments. Acaba is the first person of Hispanic heritage selected to lead the office responsible for assigning astronauts to missions and develop flight crew operation concepts. As Chief of the Astronaut Office, Acaba has traveled to other countries such as Bangladesh with a goal of educating the populace and strengthening international relations. By the end of 2025, Acaba stepped out as chief od the Astronaut Office at NASA and became part of the Director team at the Johnson Space Center in Houston, Texas.

== Recognition ==
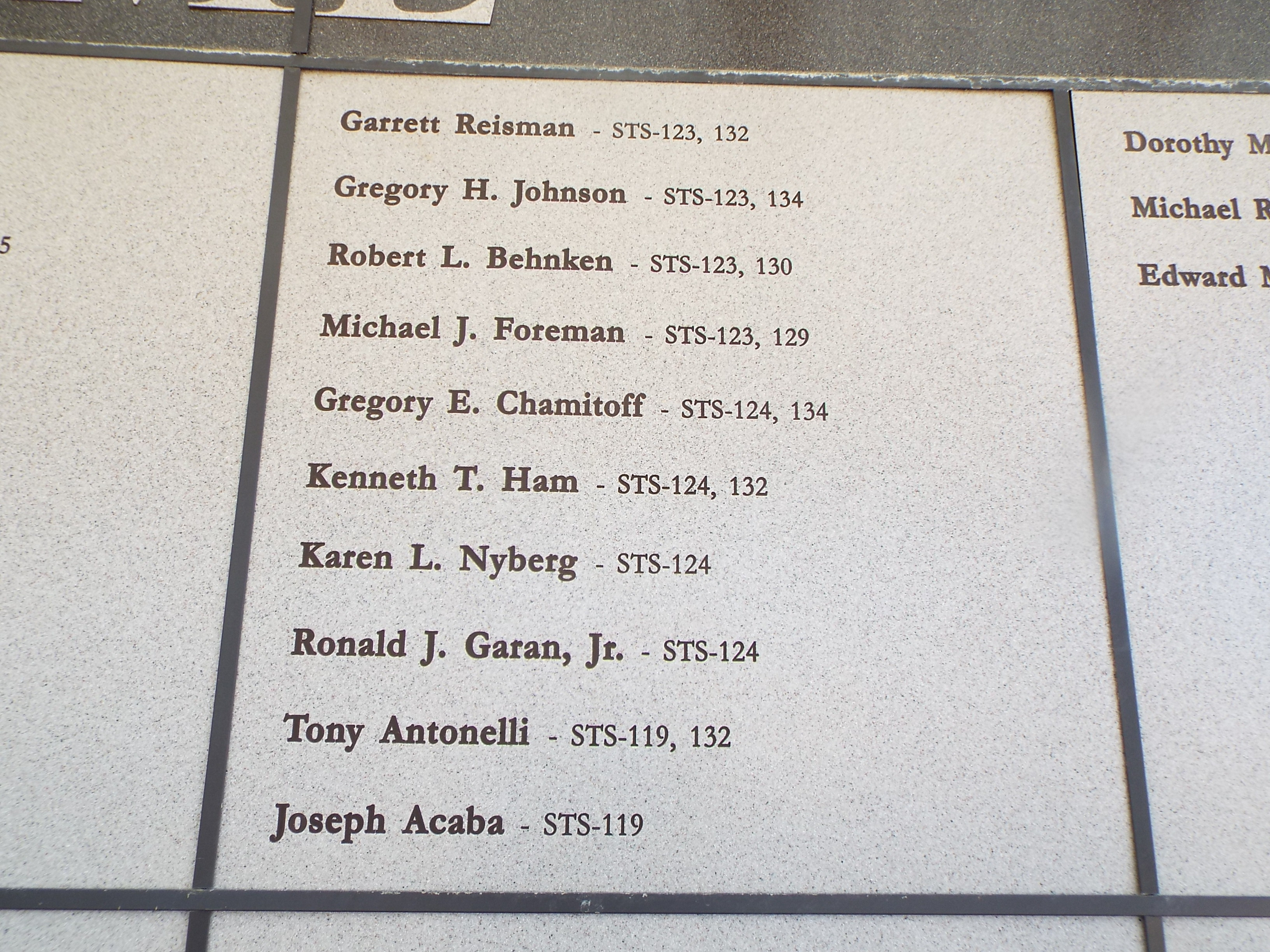
Acaba's name is inscribed in the American Astronaut Wall of Fame in Winslow, Arizona.

On March 18, 2008, Acaba was honored by the Senate of Puerto Rico, which sponsored his first trip to the Commonwealth of Puerto Rico since being selected for space flight. During his visit, which was announced by then President of the Puerto Rican Senate, Kenneth McClintock, he met with schoolchildren at the Capitol, as well as at the Bayamón, Puerto Rico Science Park, which includes a planetarium and several surplus NASA rockets among its exhibits.

Acaba returned to Puerto Rico on June 1, 2009. During his visit, he was presented with a proclamation by Governor Luis Fortuño. He spent seven days on the island and came into contact with over 10,000 persons, most of them schoolchildren.

He received the Ana G. Mendez University System Presidential Medal and an Honorary Doctorate from the Polytechnic University of Puerto Rico, where he inaugurated a flight simulator on February 7, 2013, during one of his visits to Puerto Rico to promote the study of math and science among students, as well as to visit his relatives. Caras Magazine named him one of the most influential and exciting Puerto Ricans of 2012.

== See also ==
- List of Hispanic astronauts
- List of Puerto Ricans
- Puerto Rican scientists and inventors
- List of Puerto Ricans in the United States Space Program
- Hispanics in the United States Marine Corps – Aspect of USMC history

Preceded by Reid Wiseman	Chief of the Astronaut Office; 2022–present	Incumbent
