= Sergey Revin =

Russian cosmonaut (born 1966)

Sergei Revin
- Сергей Ревин
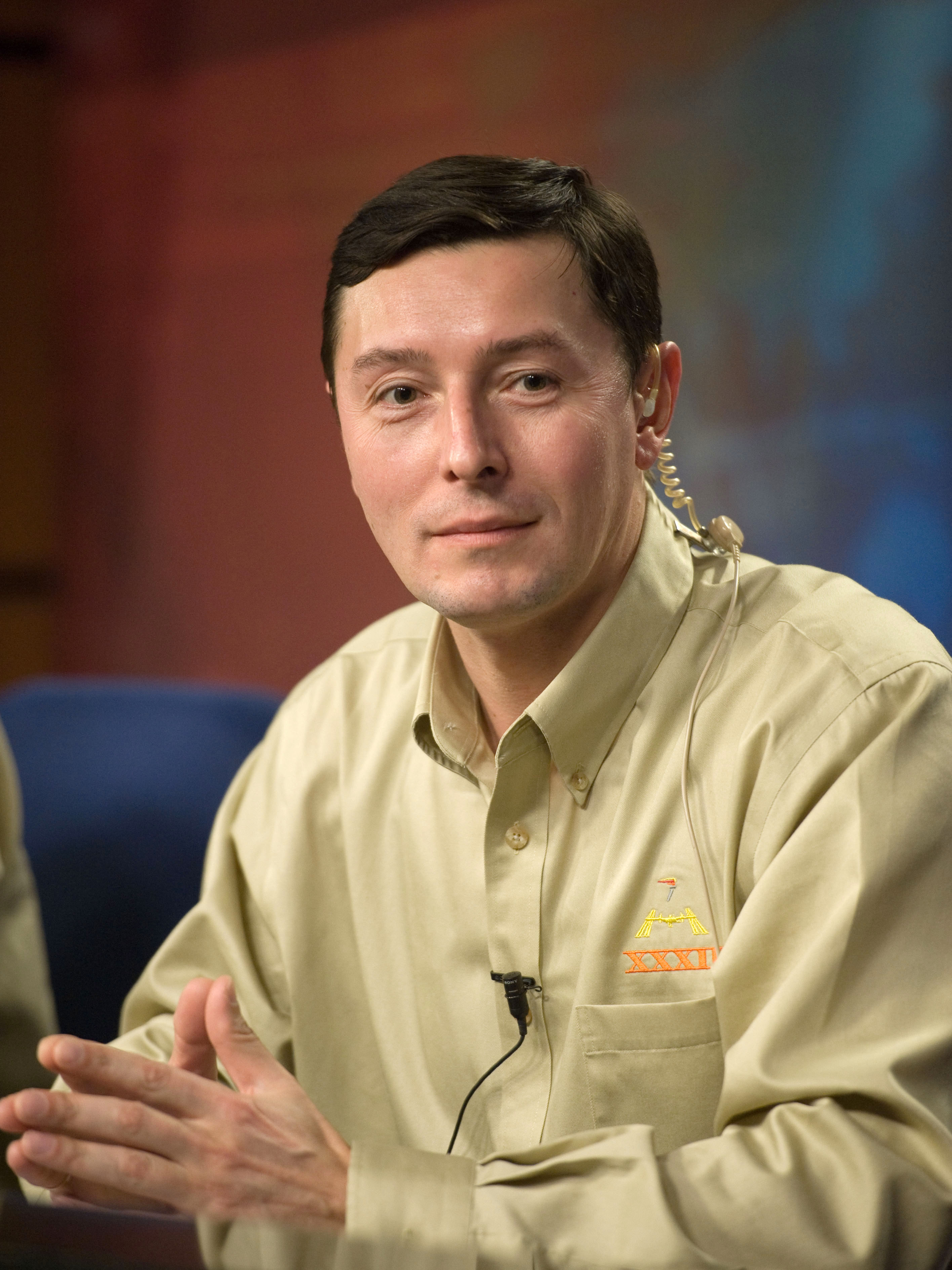
- Born: January 12, 1966 (age 60); Moscow, Russian SFSR
- Occupations: Lieutenant Colonel, Russian Air Force
- Space career

Roscosmos cosmonaut
- Status: Retired
- Time in space: 124 days 23 hours 52 minutes
- Selection: 1996 RKKE Group
- Mission: Soyuz TMA-04M (Expedition 31/32)
- Retired: April 21, 2017

Sergei Nikolayevich Revin (Russian: Сергей Николаевич Ревин; born January 12, 1966, in Moscow) is a former Russian cosmonaut that was selected in 1996, and completed spaceflight training in 1998. He served as a crew member aboard the International Space Station, having launched on his first spaceflight on 15 May 2012 and returned on 17 September 2012.

== Personal ==
Revin is married to Irina Setyanova and has one son, Yaroslav, who was born in 2000. He enjoys tourism, skiing and water skiing, balloon flights, photo and videotaping.

== Education ==
Revin graduated from the Moscow Institute of Electronic Technology in 1989 and was qualified as an engineer-physicist. He was a post-graduate student at the Moscow University for the Humanities and was qualified as Candidate of Pedagogic Sciences in 2013.

== Experience ==
After graduation, Revin worked as an engineer for the NPO IT, a scientific production organization of measuring equipment in Kaliningrad from 1989 until 1993. From 30 August 1993 until April 1996, he worked as an engineer at the NPO-Energia named in honor of Sergei Korolev.

== Cosmonaut career ==
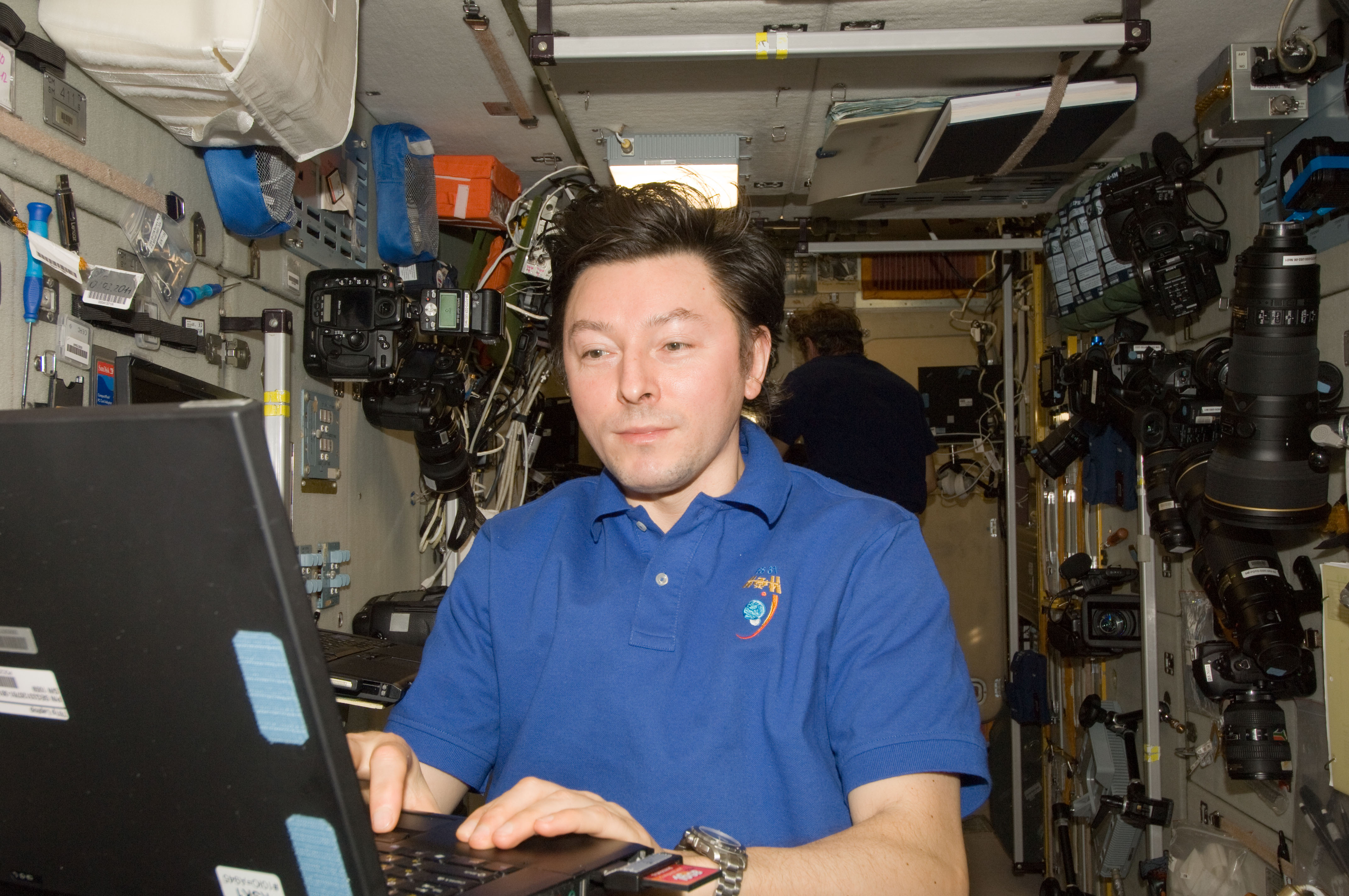
Sergei Revin in the Zvezda Service Module of the International Space Station in August 2012.

In April 1996, Revin was enlisted to the NPO-Energia cosmonaut corps as a test cosmonaut candidate. From April 1996 to June 1998, he was taking basic space training course. On June 17, 1998, the Interdepartmental Qualification Board qualified him as a test cosmonaut.

From July 1998 to January 2011, he was a test cosmonaut of the Energia Rocket and Space Corporation. Since January 2011, he is a test cosmonaut of the Gagarin Cosmonaut Training Center. From October 1998 to April 2011, he took advanced training course, specializing on the International Space Station Program. Since April 2011, he trained as the Expedition 29/30 backup crew member specializing as the Soyuz TMA flight engineer and the ISS flight engineer.

In April 2017, Revin was excluded from Cosmonaut Training Center due to medical reason.

=== Expedition 31/32 ===
Revin served as a flight engineer for the ISS long duration Expedition 31/32 missions. He launched aboard the Soyuz TMA-04M spacecraft on 15 May 2012 along with Soyuz TMA-04M crew members Gennady Padalka and NASA astronaut Joseph M. Acaba. Revin and his fellow TMA-04M crew members docked with the International Space Station on 17 May at 4:36 UTC. Revin, along with Padalka and Acaba, landed in Kazakhstan on 17 September 2012.

== See also ==
- List of Heroes of the Russian Federation
