= Soyuz TMA-04M =

2012 Russian crewed spaceflight to the ISS

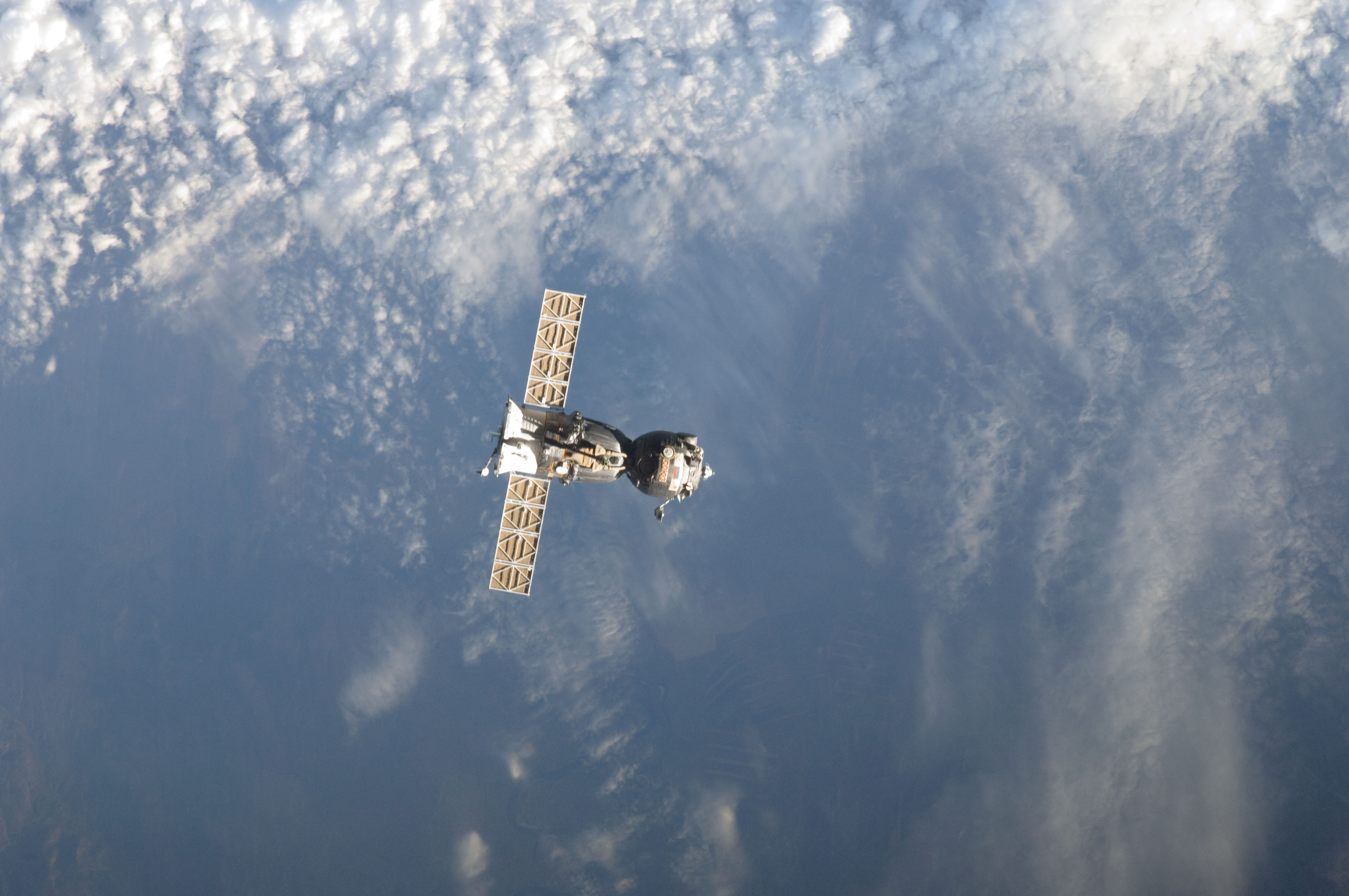
- Soyuz TMA-04M departs the ISS
- Operator: Roscosmos
- COSPAR ID: 2012-022A
- SATCAT no.: 38291
- Mission duration: 124 days, 23 hours, 51 minutes, 30 seconds
- Orbits completed: ~1,945

Spacecraft properties
- Spacecraft type: Soyuz-TMA 11F747
- Manufacturer: Energia

Crew
- Crew size: 3
- Members: Gennady Padalka; Sergey Revin; Joseph M. Acaba
- Callsign: Altair

Start of mission
- Launch date: 15 May 2012, 03:01:23 UTC
- Rocket: Soyuz-FG
- Launch site: Baikonur 1/5

End of mission
- Landing date: 17 September 2012, 02:53 UTC

Orbital parameters
- Reference system: Geocentric
- Regime: Low Earth
- Perigee altitude: 410 kilometres (250 mi)
- Apogee altitude: 433 kilometres (269 mi)
- Inclination: 51.64 degrees
- Period: 92.86 minutes
- Epoch: 17 September 2012, 01:22:43 UTC

Docking with ISS
- Docking port: Poisk zenith
- Docking date: 17 May 2012, 04:36 UTC
- Undocking date: 16 September 2012, 23:09 UTC
- Time docked: 4 months
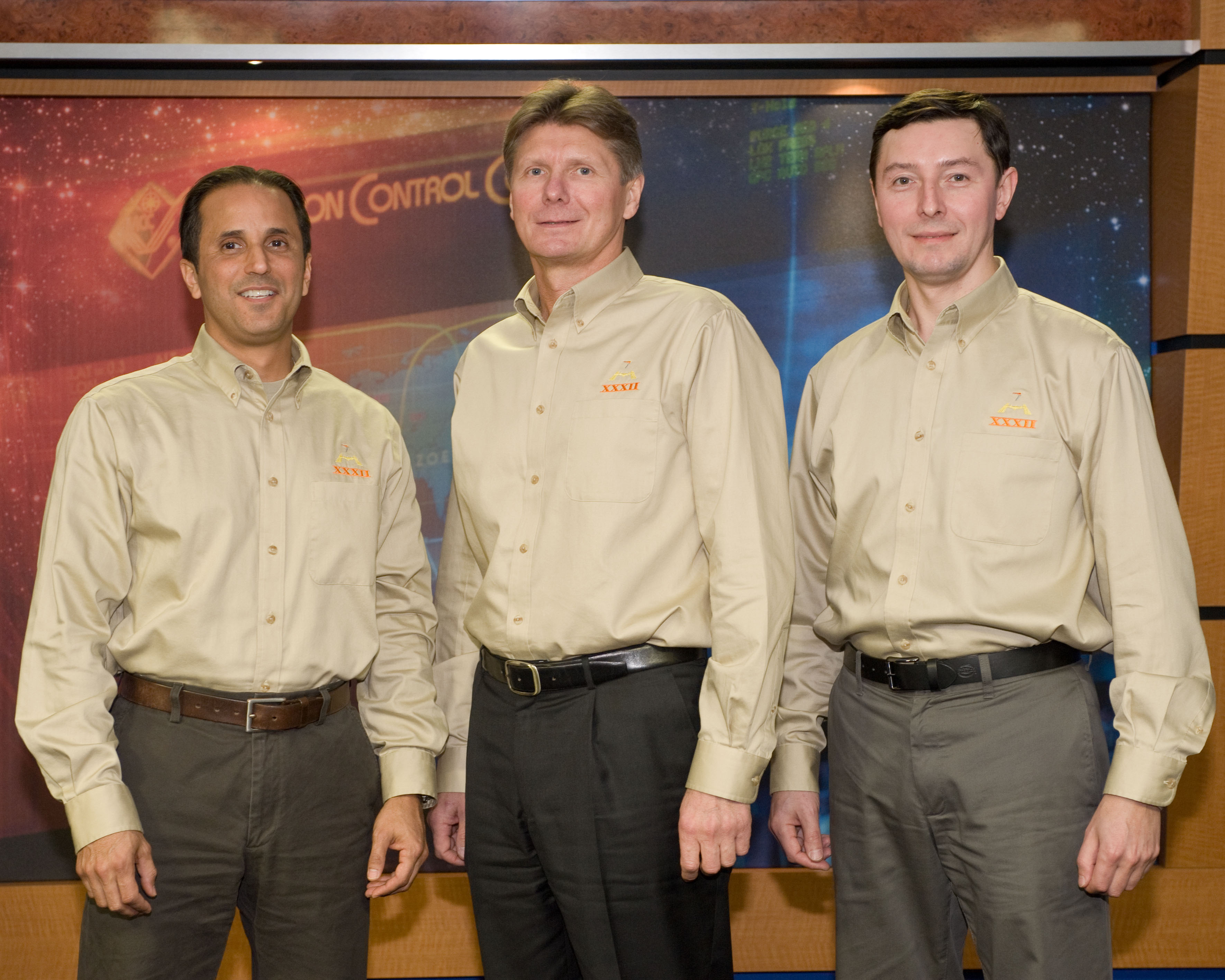
- (l-r) Acaba, Padalka and Revin Soyuz programme (Crewed missions)

Soyuz TMA-04M was a spaceflight to Low Earth orbit that transported three members of the Expedition 31 crew to the International Space Station (ISS), which was launched on 15 May 2012 and landed on 17 September 2012. TMA-04M was the Soyuz spacecraft's 113th flight since its initial launch in 1967, and the fourth launch of the improved Soyuz TMA-M series (first launched 7 October 2010). As per the mission plan, the spacecraft remained docked to the space station to serve as an emergency escape vehicle during Expedition 31.

The mission was successfully launched to the International Space Station from the Baikonur Cosmodrome in Kazakhstan on Tuesday, 15 May 2012, at 3:01:23 UTC (9:01:23 local time). The Soyuz docked successfully with the ISS on 17 May at 4:36 UTC. The spacecraft carried to the ISS a three-person crew (Gennady Padalka, Russia; Sergei Revin, Russia; Joseph Acaba, United States). The mission landed successfully in Kazakhstan on 17 September 2012, at 2:53 UTC.

== Crew ==
Position	Crew Member
Commander	(Russia) Gennady Padalka, Roscosmos; Expedition 31; Fourth spaceflight
Flight Engineer 1	(Russia) Sergey Revin, Roscosmos; Expedition 31; Only spaceflight
Flight Engineer 2	(United States) Joseph M. Acaba, NASA; Expedition 31; Second spaceflight

=== Backup crew ===
Position	Crew Member
Commander	(Russia) Oleg Novitskiy, Roscosmos
Flight Engineer 1	(Russia) Evgeny Tarelkin, Roscosmos
Flight Engineer 2	(United States) Kevin A. Ford, NASA

== Spacecraft ==
Soyuz TMA-04M was the fourth mission using the upgraded Soyuz TMA-M spacecraft, which has a modernised flight control system and a reduced mass. The spacecraft was designed and manufactured by S.P. Korolev Rocket and Space Corporation Energia, the largest company of the Russian space industry.

== Mission highlights ==
Soyuz TMA-04M was successfully launched to the International Space Station from the Baikonur Cosmodrome in Kazakhstan on Tuesday, 15 May 2012, at 3:01:23 UTC (9:01:23 local Baikonur time). The spacecraft docked with the International Space Station on Thursday, 17 May at 4:36 UTC, linking to the Poisk docking module.

After the departure of Soyuz TMA-03M on 1 June the crew members of TMA-04M conducted the first portion of Expedition 32 until the commencement of the second portion with the arrival of the remaining crew members aboard Soyuz TMA-05M in mid-July. The spacecraft undocked from the ISS at 23:09 UTC on 16 September and landed at 2:53 UTC on September 17 in Kazakhstan.

== Gallery ==
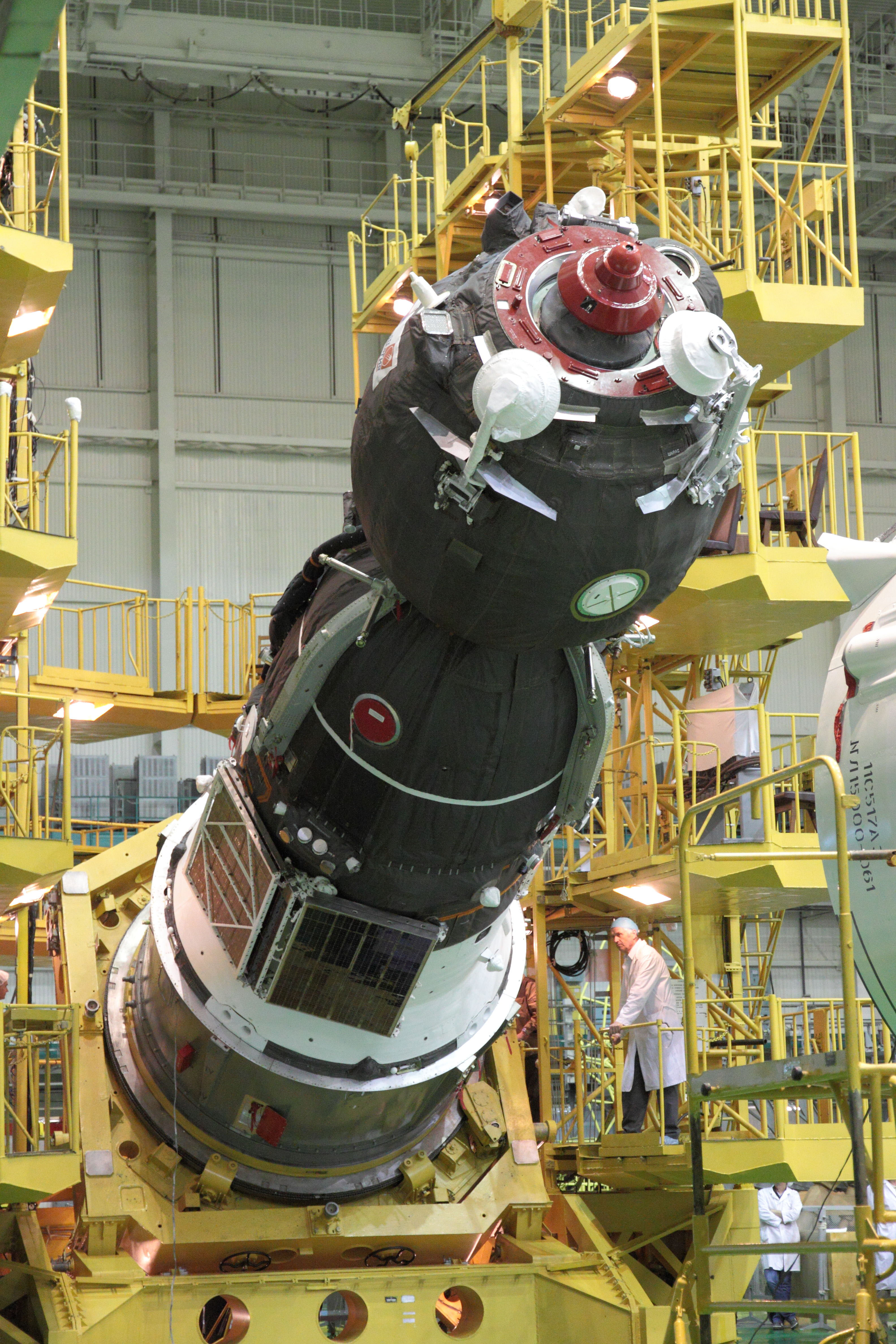
The Soyuz TMA-04M spacecraft during pre-launch processing on 8 May 2012.

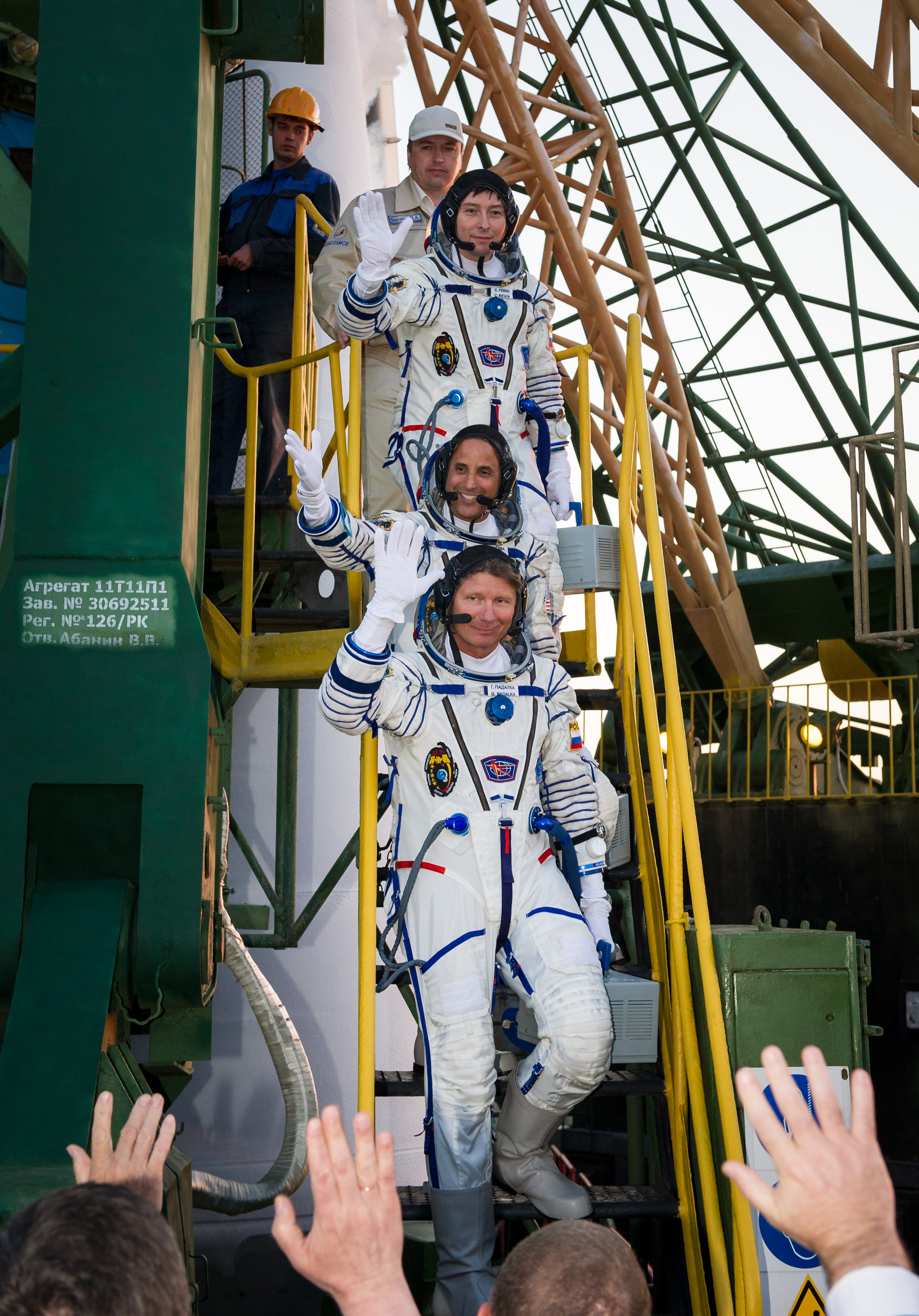
The TMA-04M crew wave to spectators before launch on May 15, 2012.

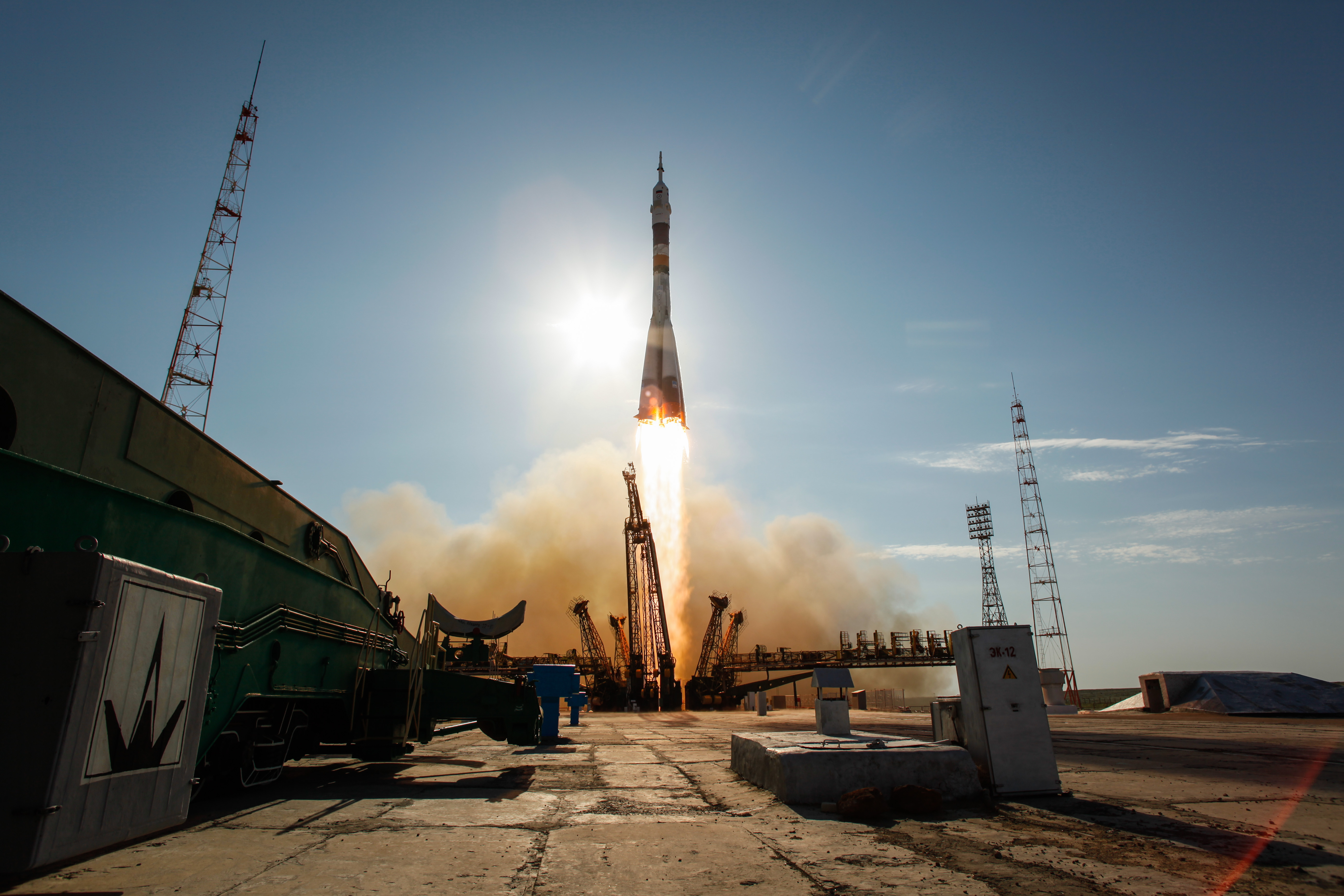
The Soyuz TMA-04M mission lifts-off to the ISS on 15 May 2012.
