= Expedition 31 =

Long-duration mission to the International Space Station

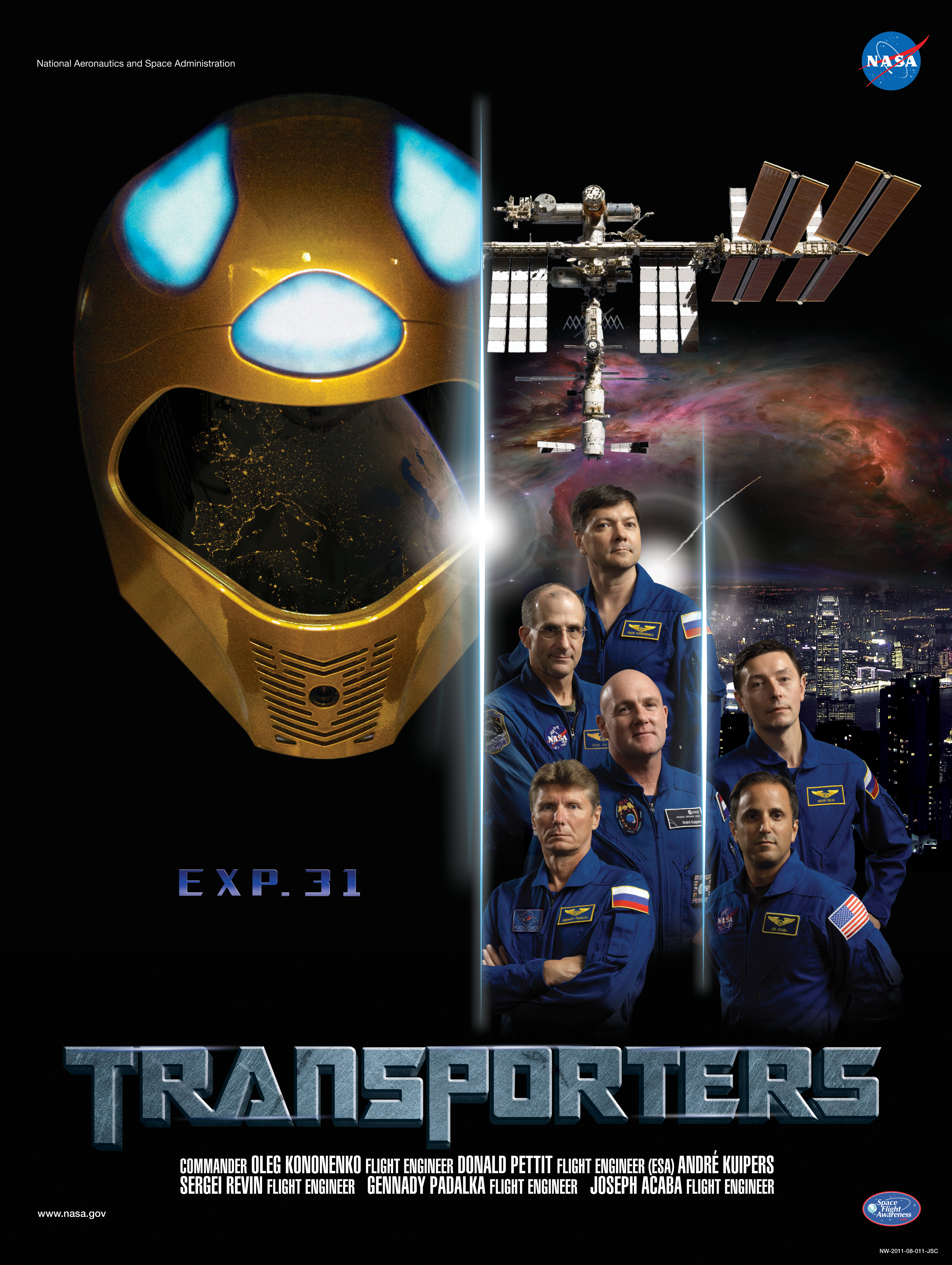
- Promotional Poster
- Mission type: Long-duration expedition

Expedition
- Space station: International Space Station
- Began: 27 April 2012, 08:15 UTC
- Ended: 1 July 2012, 04:48 UTC
- Arrived aboard: Soyuz TMA-03M; Soyuz TMA-04M
- Departed aboard: Soyuz TMA-03M; Soyuz TMA-04M

Crew
- Crew size: 6
- Members: Expedition 30/31: Oleg Kononenko; André Kuipers; Donald Pettit Expedition 31/32: Joseph M. Acaba; Gennady Padalka; Sergey Revin
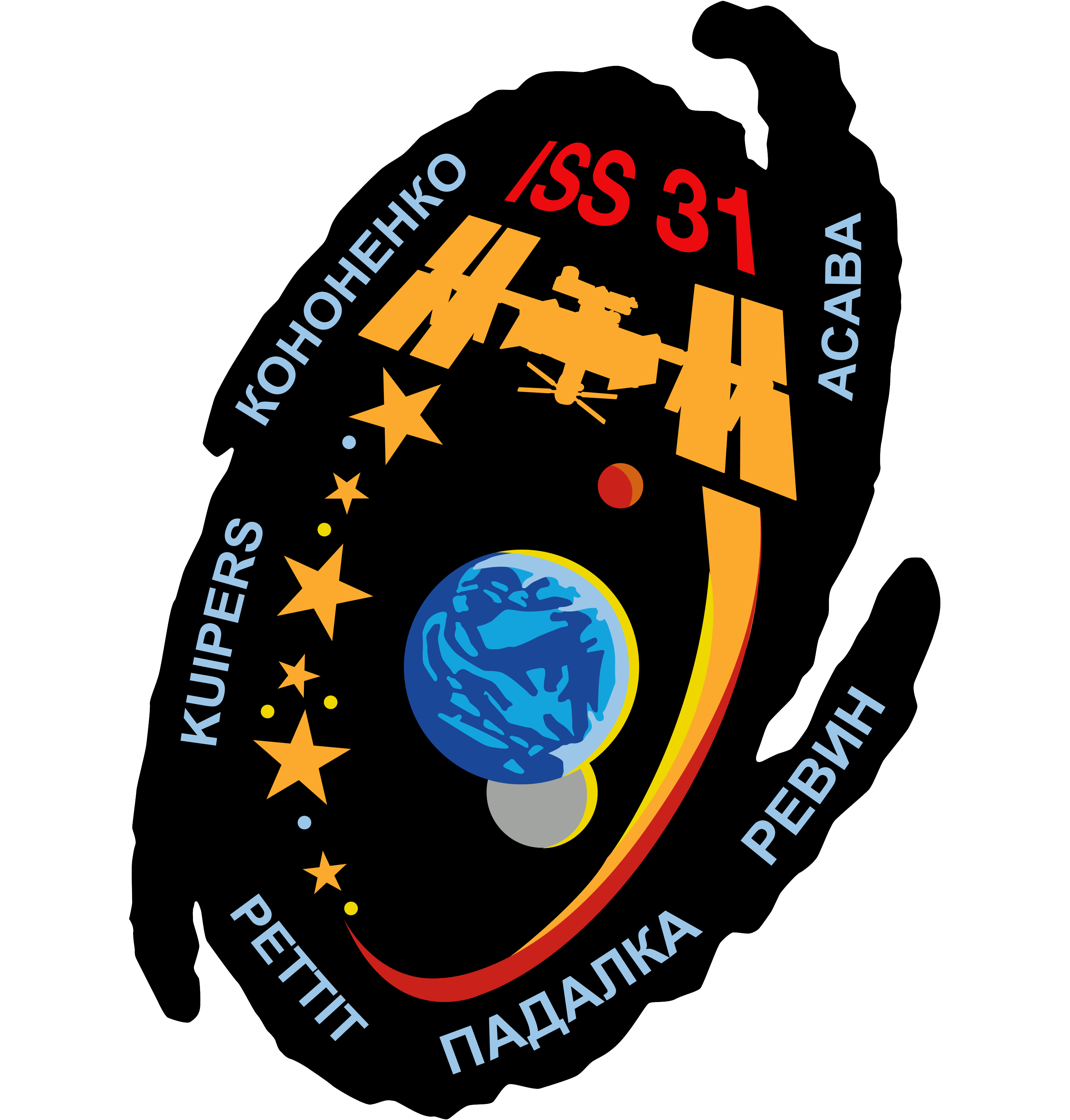
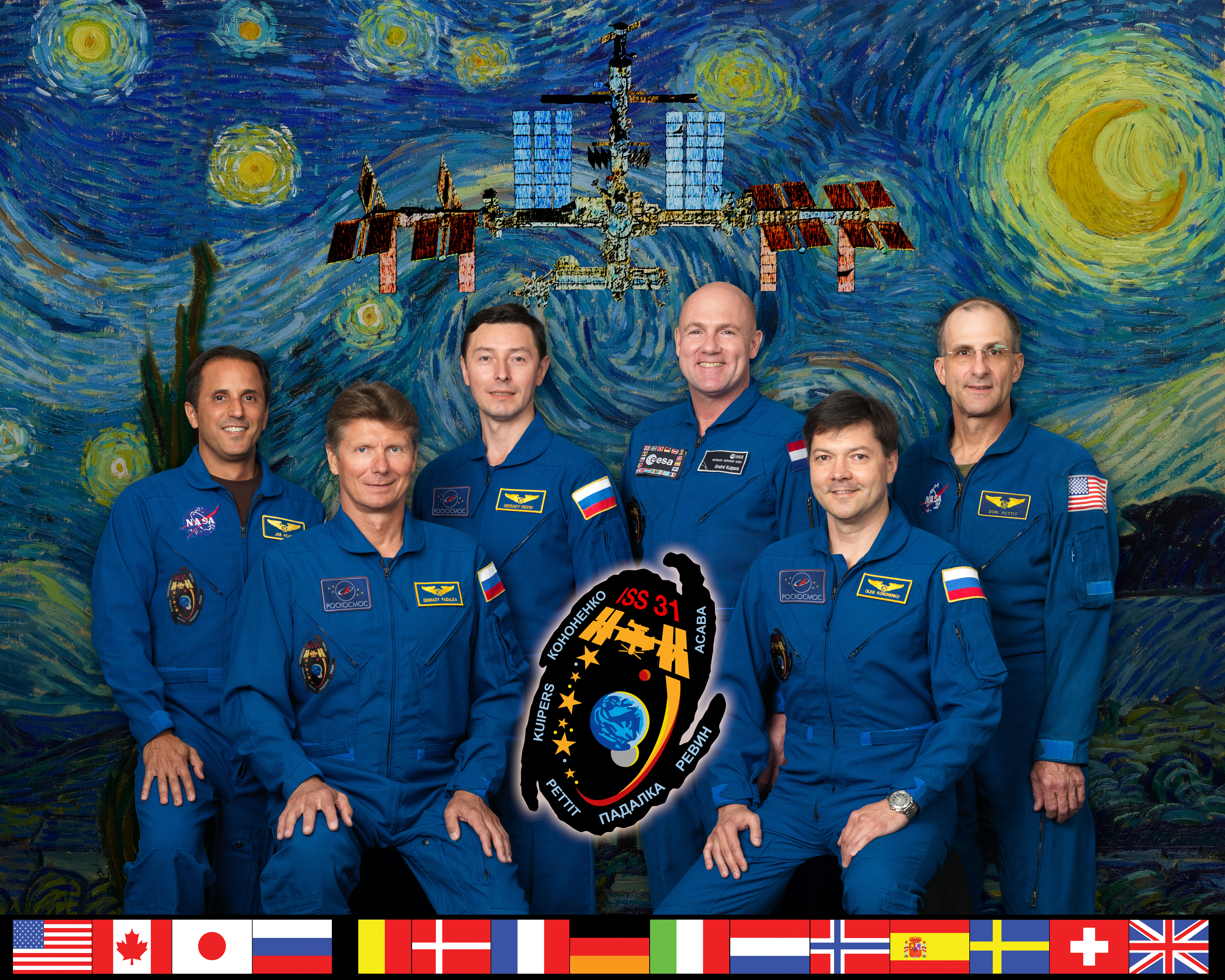
- Expedition 31 mission patch (l-r) Acaba, Padalka, Revin, Kuipers, Kononenko and Pettit ISS expeditions

Expedition 31 was the 31st long-duration expedition to the International Space Station (ISS). It began on 27 April 2012 with the departure from the ISS of the Soyuz TMA-22 spacecraft, which returned the Expedition 30 crew to Earth. The expedition ended on 1 July 2012, when crew members Oleg Kononenko, André Kuipers and Don Pettit departed from the ISS aboard Soyuz TMA-03M, marking the beginning of Expedition 32.

== Crew ==
Position	First part (April 2012 to May 2012)	Second part (May 2012 to July 2012)
Commander	Oleg Kononenko, RSA; Second spaceflight	
Flight Engineer 1	André Kuipers, ESA; Second and last spaceflight	
Flight Engineer 2	Donald Pettit, NASA; Third spaceflight	
Flight Engineer 3		Joseph M. Acaba, NASA; Second spaceflight
Flight Engineer 4		Gennady Padalka, RSA; Fourth spaceflight
Flight Engineer 5		Sergey Revin, RSA; Only spaceflight

Source
NASA

== Mission highlights ==
=== Soyuz TMA-22 departure ===
Expedition 31 formally began on 27 April 2012, with the departure from the ISS of the Soyuz TMA-22 spacecraft. Soyuz TMA-22 successfully returned Expedition 30 astronauts Dan Burbank, Anton Shkaplerov and Anatoli Ivanishin to Earth. The ISS was left under the command of astronauts Kononenko, Kuipers and Pettit, who had arrived at the station aboard Soyuz TMA-03M on 23 December 2011.

=== Soyuz TMA-04M arrival ===
The final three members of Expedition 31 – Acaba, Padalka and Revin – arrived at the ISS aboard Soyuz TMA-04M, which launched on 15 May 2012, and docked to the ISS on 17 May at 4:36 UTC.

=== SpaceX Dragon test mission ===
SpaceX's unmanned Dragon spacecraft conducted a test rendezvous with the ISS during Expedition 31, as part of NASA's Commercial Orbital Transportation Services program; it was the first commercial spacecraft to rendezvous with the ISS. Following a series of delays, Dragon launched on 22 May 2012, and berthed successfully with the ISS on 25 May, after conducting a series of orbital test manoeuvres. Dragon carried around 460 kilograms (1,010 lb) of cargo to the ISS, including food, clothing, a laptop computer and 15 student experiments. After being loaded with 660 kilograms (1,460 lb) of downmass cargo, including completed experiments and redundant equipment, it undocked from the station and returned to Earth on 31 May 2012. Dragon landed intact in the Pacific Ocean and was successfully recovered, allowing SpaceX to begin regular cargo flights to the ISS. The first such logistics mission, CRS SpX-1, launched successfully in October 2012.

=== Soyuz TMA-03M departure ===
Soyuz TMA-03M departed from the ISS on 1 July 2012, successfully returning Kononenko, Kuipers and Pettit to Earth. Their departure marked the formal end of Expedition 31, and the beginning of Expedition 32.

== In popular culture ==
In the 2012 The Big Bang Theory episode "The Friendship Contraction", character Howard Wolowitz reveals that he will be a member of a fictionalized version of Expedition 31, alongside Dimitri Rezinov, a character created for the show, and Mike Massimino, playing a fictional version of himself.

== Gallery ==
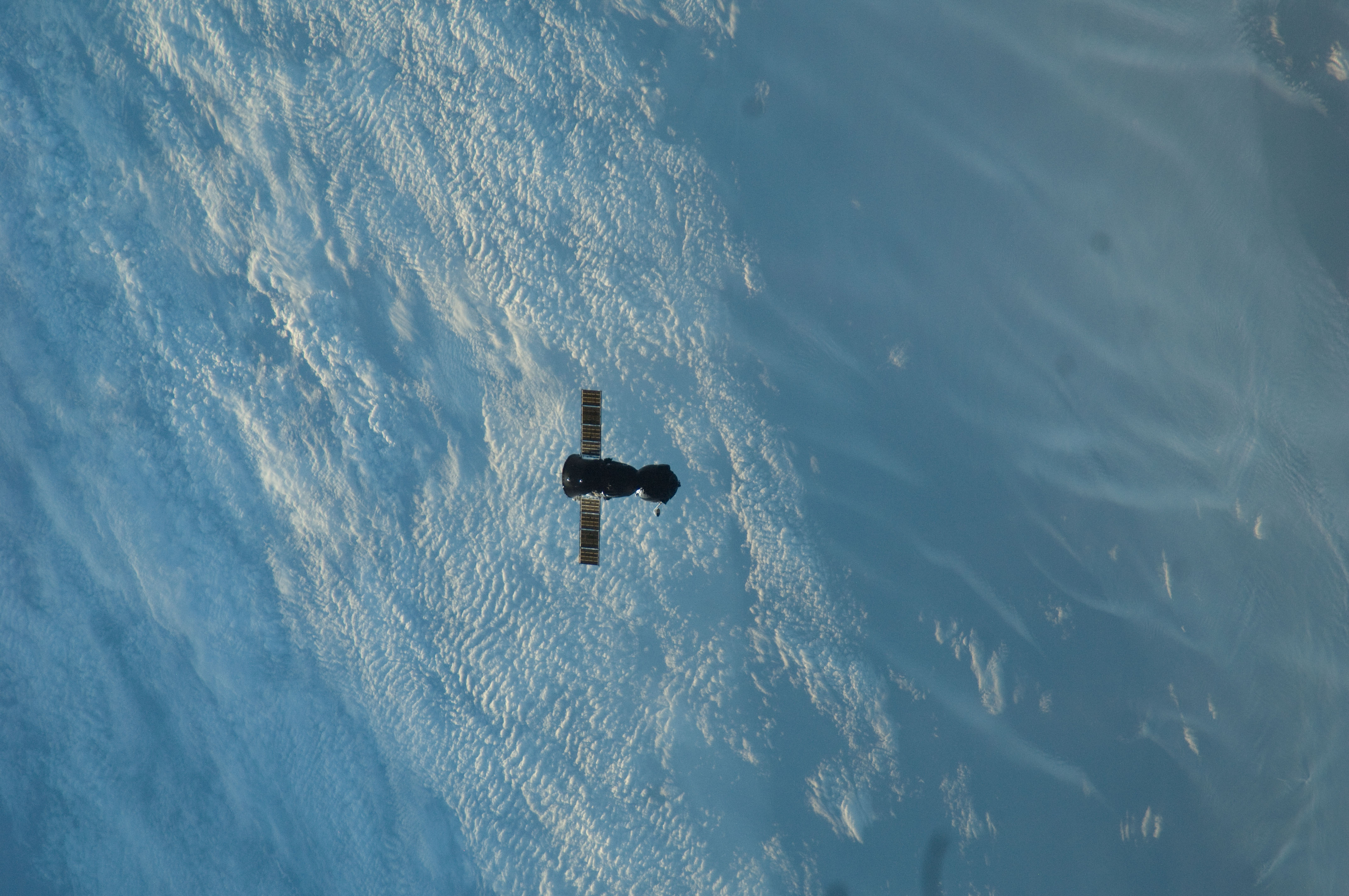
Soyuz TMA-22 departs the ISS on 27 April 2012, marking the beginning of Expedition 31.

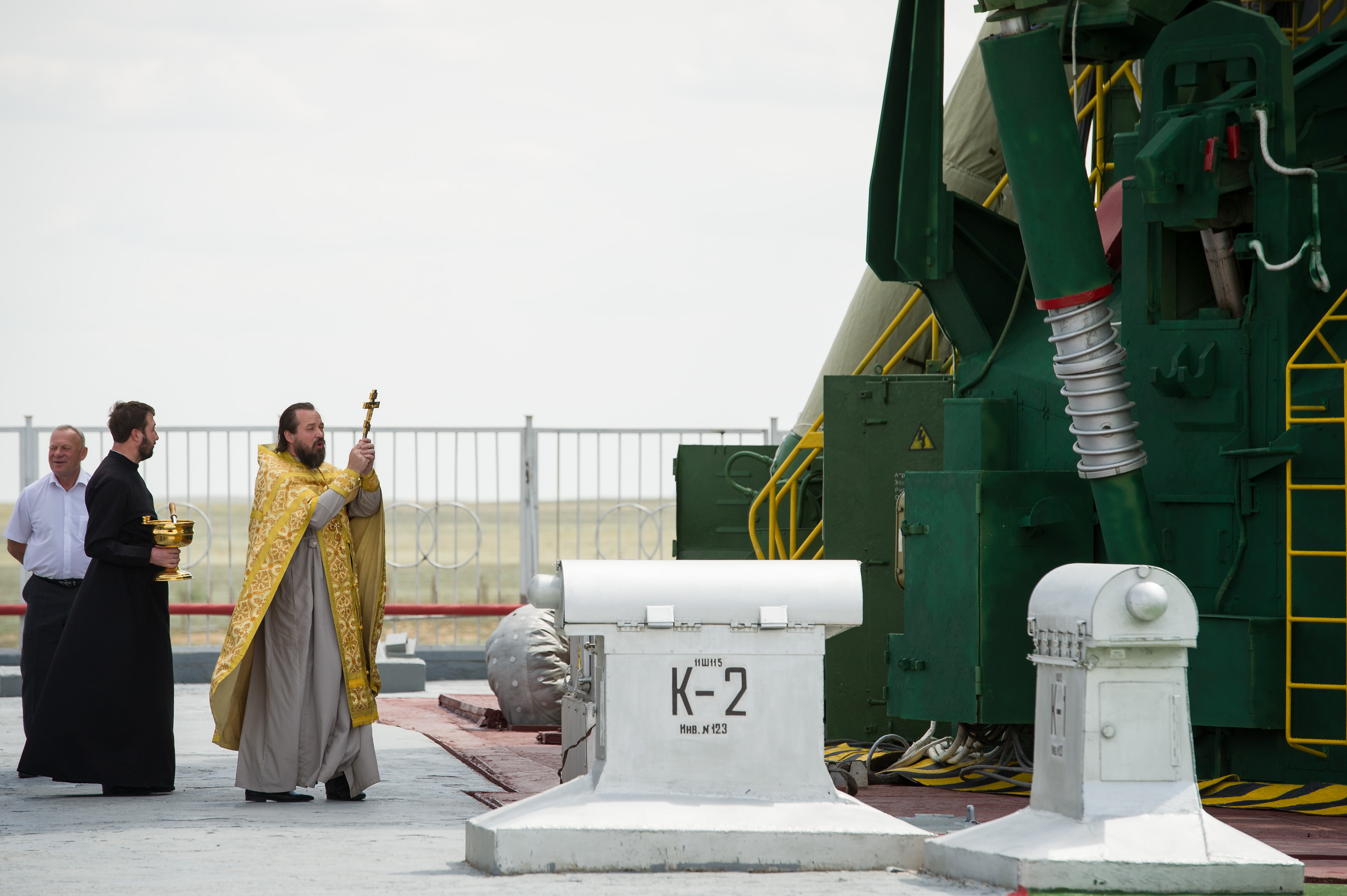
An Orthodox priest blesses the Soyuz rocket on 14 May 2012.

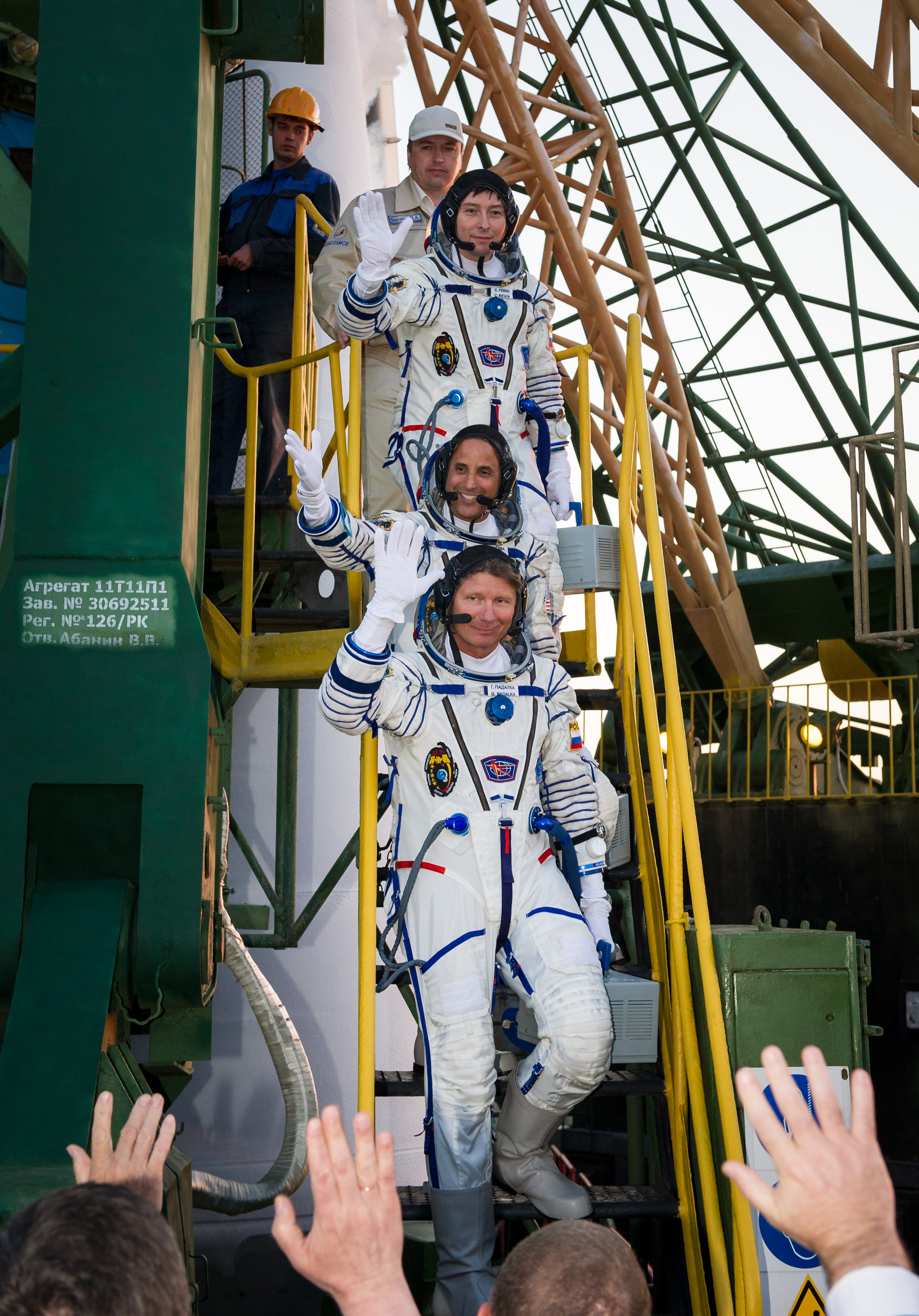
The Expedition 31 crew wave goodbye before the launch on 15 May 2012.

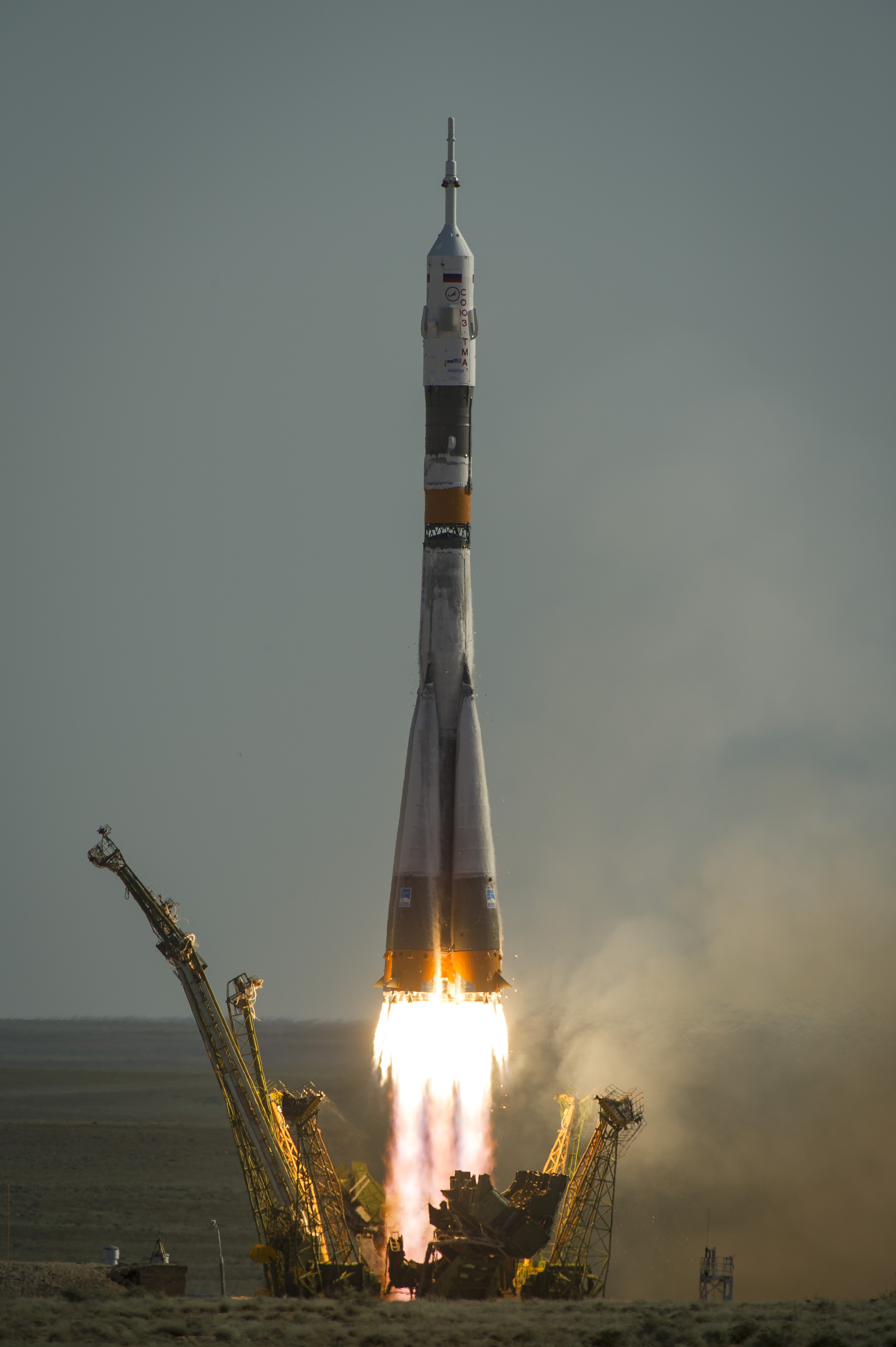
The launch of Soyuz TMA-04M on 15 May 2012.

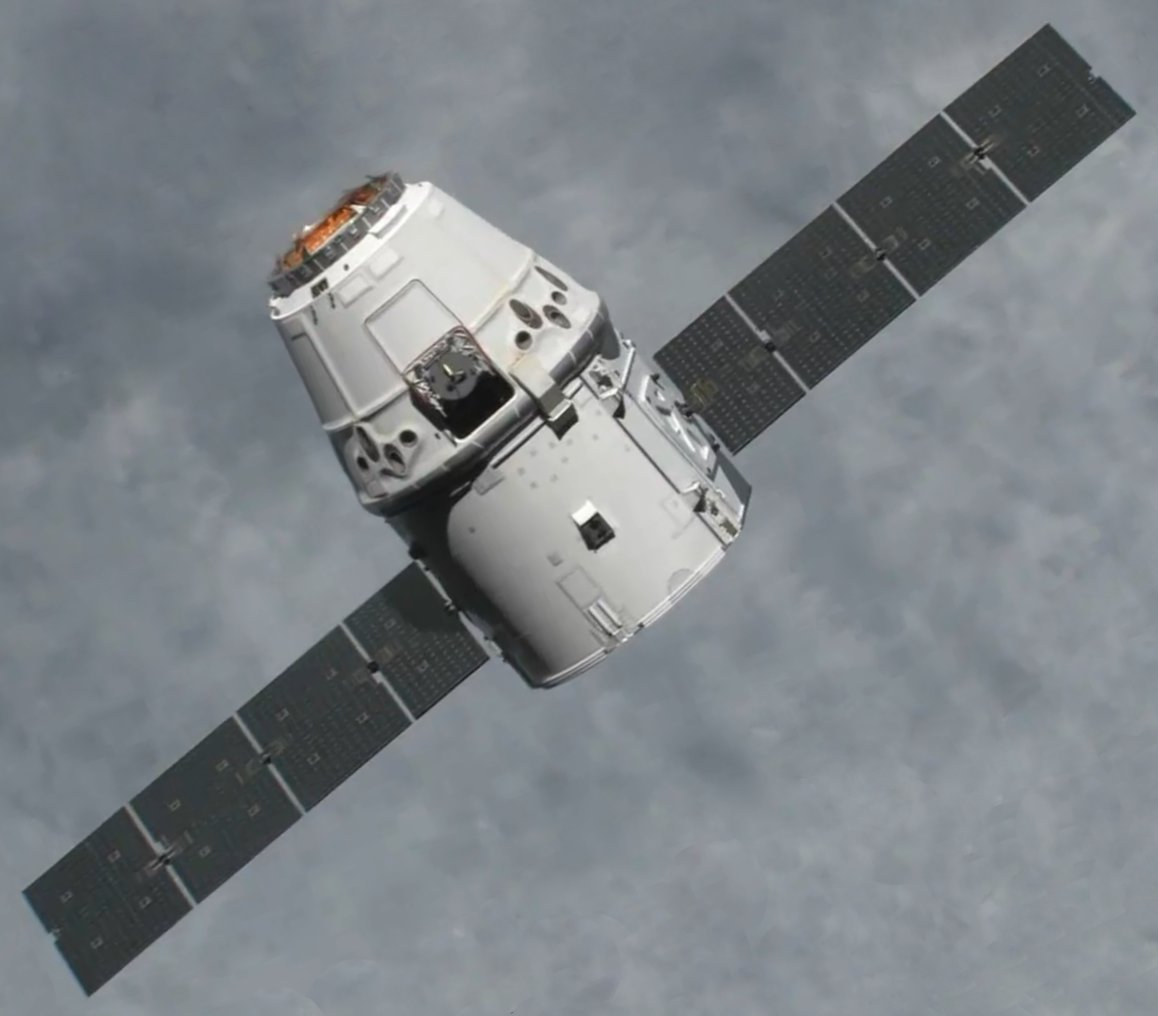
SpaceX's unmanned Dragon spacecraft approaches the ISS on 25 May 2012.

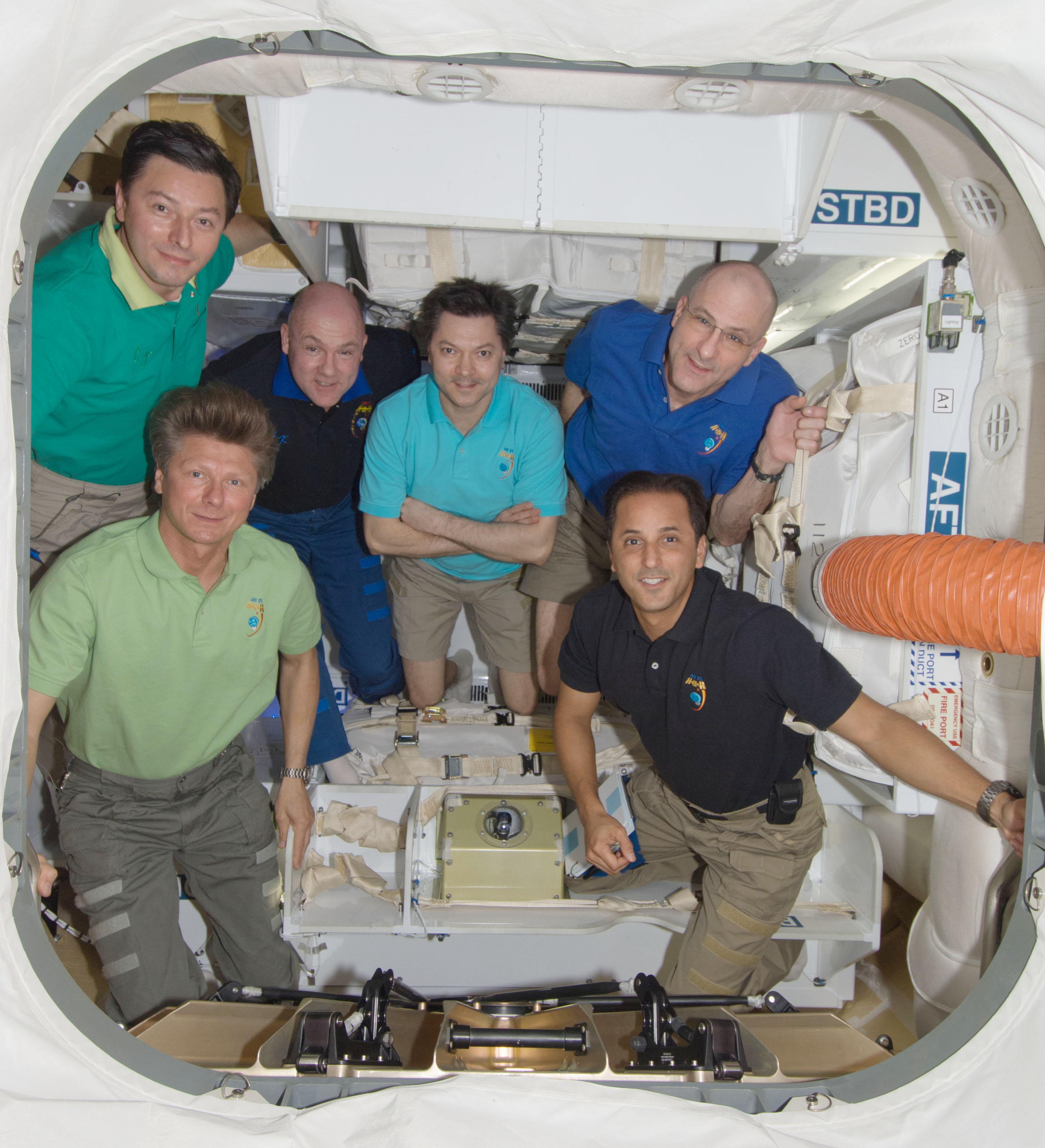
Expedition 31 posing inside the docked Dragon capsule on 29 May 2012.
